= List of Fort ships =

This is a list of Fort ships.

== Description ==
The Fort ships were a class of over 200 cargo ships built in Canada during World War II. They were mostly built for the Ministry of War Transport. They were similar to the Ocean ships, but were mostly of rivetted construction instead of welded. The Victory ships were also of a similar design, differing mainly in fuel and boilers. The ships were generally 425 feet 0 inches (129.54 m) between perpendiculars with a beam of 57 feet 0 inches (17.37 m). Their designed deadweight tonnage was 9,300, but wartime regulations allowed them to be operated at a deadweight tonnage of 10,000.

== Fort A ==
=== Fort Á La Corne ===
Fort Á La Corne was built by North Vancouver Ship Repairs Ltd., North Vancouver, British Columbia, Canada. She was completed on 13 August 1942. Built for the Ministry of War Transport (MoWT), she was placed under the management of McCowan & Cross Ltd. Torpedoed and sunk in the Mediterranean Sea (36°52′N 1°47′E) by U-596 on 30 March 1943.

=== Fort Abitibi ===
Fort Abitibi was built by Canadian Vickers Ltd., Montreal, Quebec, Canada. She was completed on 26 May 1942. Built for the MoWT, she was placed under the management of Smith, Hogg & Co. Transferred to the United States Maritime Commission (USMC) in 1947 Laid up in reserve. Scrapped at Baltimore, Maryland, United States in 1958.

=== Fort Acton ===
Fort Acton was built by Prince Rupert Drydock & Shipyard, Prince Rupert, British Columbia. She was completed on 26 February 1943. Built for the MoWT, she was placed under the management of Haldin & Philipps Ltd. Transferred to the USMC in 1947. Sold in 1948 to Comm. Giuseppe Bozza, Genoa, Italy and renamed Bacicin. Scrapped at Vado Ligure, Italy in 1969.

=== Fort Aklavik ===
Fort Aklavik was built by Prince Rupert Drydock & Shipyard. She was completed on 26 February 1943. Built for the MoWT, she was placed under the management of Dodd, Thomson & Co. Transferred to the Ministry of Transport (MoT) in 1946 and placed under the management of Novocastria Shipping Co. Sold in 1950 to Dalhousie Steam & Motor Ship Co., London and renamed Irene Dal. Sold in 1952 to Compania Maritima Volca, Panama and renamed Volcan. Sold in 1953 to Trans Oceanic Steamship Co., Karachi, Pakistan and renamed Ocean Envoy. Scrapped at Karachi in 1966.

=== Fort Alabama ===
Fort Alabama was built by Burrard Dry Dock Co., North Vancouver. She was completed on 22 August 1944. Built for the MoWT, she was placed under the management of T. & J. Brocklebank Ltd. Sold in 1947 to the Park Steamship Co., London, then sold later that year to Andros Shipping Co., Montreal and renamed Gulfside. Sold in 1951 to Compania Navigacion Panamena Antares, Panama and renamed Anthony. Sold in 1964 to Blue Shark Steamship Co., Panama and renamed Blue Marlin. Scrapped at Sakai, Japan in 1967.

=== Fort Albany ===
Fort Albany was built by Davie Shipbuilding & Repairing Co. Ltd., Lauzon, Quebec. She was completed on 28 May 1943. Built for the MoWT, she was placed under the management of Frank S. Dawson Ltd. To MoT in 1946 and placed under the management of H. Roberts & Son. Sold in 1948 to P & T Steamship Co., Montreal and renamed La Fleche. Operated under the management of Papachristidis Co. Sold in 1953 to Compania Atlantica Pacifica, Panama. Scrapped at Mihara, Japan in 1961.

=== Fort Alexandria ===
Fort Alexandria was built by North Vancouver Ship Repairs Ltd. She was completed on 27 May 1942. Built for the MoWT, she was placed under the management of Headlam & Son. Transferred to USMC in 1948. Sold later that year to Società Italiana di Armamento "Sidarma", Venice, Italy and renamed Vettor Pisani. Sold in 1950 to Marittima Napoletan Società di Navigazione, Naples. Renamed Ardea in 1952, converted to a motor vessel in 1955. Sold in 1963 to Compania de Navigacion Mario S.A., Monrovia, Liberia and renamed Tornado. Sold later that year to Victoria Carriers Inc., Monrovia and renamed Victoria Venture. Scrapped at Kaohsiung, Taiwan in 1969.

=== Fort Anne ===
Fort Anne was built by Burrard Dry Dock Co. She was completed on 23 December 1942. Built for the MoWT, she was placed under the management of Hain Steamship Co. To MoT in 1946 and placed under the management of Lyle Shipping Co. To USMC in 1947. Laid up in reserve. Scrapped at Baltimore in 1958.

=== Fort Ash ===
Fort Ash was built by Burrard Dry Dock Co. She was completed on 12 April 1942. Built for the MoWT, she was placed under the management of Dene Shipping Co. To MoT in 1946, operated under the management of Houlder Bros. Ltd. Chartered for two years in 1947 by Houlder Bros. Sold in 1950 to Houlder Bros. & Co. and renamed Royston Grange. Sold in 1952 to "I.N.S.A." Società di Navigazione, Genoa and renamed Giuan. Sold in 1960 to "Portoria" Compagnia di Navigazione, Genoa and renamed Cinqueterra. Sold in 1961 to Myrinella Naviera S.A., Piraeus, Greece and renamed Tilemahos. Sold in 1965 to Triton Shipping (Gibraltar) Ltd., Gibraltar and renamed Elicos. Scrapped at Split, Yugoslavia in 1966.

=== Fort Aspin (I) ===
Fort Aspin was built by Prince Rupert Dry Dock and Shipyard. She was completed on 26 November 1943 as Winnepegosis Park. Built for Park Steamship Co., she was placed under the management of Canada Shipping Co. Sold in 1947 to Andros Shipping Co., Montreal and renamed Bayside. Sold in 1950 to Guardia Compania Navigacion S.A., Panama and renamed Aghia Anastasia. Ran aground off Tobago on 22 June 1950. She was refloated but sank on 25 June (11°09′N 60°56′W).

=== Fort Aspin (II) ===
Fort Aspin was built by Prince Rupert Dry Dock and Shipyard. She was completed on 27 January 1944. Built for the MoWT, she was placed under the management of T. Dunlop & Sons. Sold in 1946 to Triton Steamship Corp., Montreal and renamed Triport Sold in 1950 to Compania Maritima del Este, Panama and renamed Heron. Sold in 1954 to Society Armadora del Norte, Panama, then sold later that year to Compania Maritima de Navegacion Conval, Panama. Operated under the management of V. N. Goulandris. Reflagged to Greece in 1960 and renamed Tinos. Sold in 1963 to Prosperity Navigation Corp., Monrovia and renamed Evergreen. Scrapped at Kaohsiung in 1967.

=== Fort Assiniboine ===
Fort Assiniboine was built by Burrard Drydock Co. Ltd. She was completed on 27 April 1943. Built for the MoWT, she was placed under the management of H. Hogarth & Sons. To MoT in 1946, management transferred to William Brown, Atkinson & Co. Sold in 1948 to Laurentian Overseas Shipping Ltd. Montreal and renamed Laurentian Lake. Placed under the management of Fern Hill Steamship Co. in 1951. Sold in 1954 to Monovar Compania Navigacion, Monrovia and renamed Olympos. Operated under the management of Coulouthros Ltd. Sold in 1960 to Compania de Navigacion Cerra Guaca S.A., Andros, Greece and renamed Penteli H.. Sold in 1963 to Corona compania Navigacion, Andros and renamed Gialia. Operated under the management of Coulouthros Ltd. Sold later that year to Marimperio Compania Navigacion, Piraeus and renamed Paxoi. Scrapped in China in 1967.

=== Fort Astoria ===
Fort Astoria was built by West Coast Shipbuilders Ltd., Vancouver, British Columbia. She was launched on 21 May 1943, and completed on 19 July. Built for the MoWT, she was placed under the management of Counties Ship Management Co. Sold in 1946 to Acadia Overseas Freighters Ltd., Halifax, Nova Scotia, Canada and renamed Yarmouth County. Sold in 1948 to Compania de Navigacion San George, Panama and renamed Santa Despo. Disabled in a gale in the Pacific Ocean 600 nautical miles (1,100 km) north of Midway Island on 8 January 1953. Sold in 1955 to Paranalto Compania Navigacion, Panama and renamed Mount Ithome. Scrapped at Santander, Spain in 1967.

=== Fort Athabaska ===
Fort Athabaska was built by Burrard Dry Dock Co. Ltd. She was completed on 15 May 1943. Built for the MoWT, she was placed under the management of J. & C. Harrison Ltd. Caught fire and exploded in an air raid on Bari, Italy on 2 December 1943.

=== Fort Augustus ===
Fort Augustus was built by North Vancouver Ship Repairs Ltd. She was completed on 13 June 1942. Built for the MoWT, she was placed under the management of Watts, Watts & Co. Transferred to United States Maritime Commission in 1948. Laid up in reserve. Scrapped at Beaumont, Texas, United States in 1958.

== Fort B ==
=== Fort Babine ===
Fort Babine was built by North Vancouver Ship Repairs Ltd. She was completed on 26 June 1942. Built for the MoWT, she was placed under the management of W. Thompson & Co. Torpedoed and damaged in the Mediterranean Sea (36°15′N 0°15′E) by Luftwaffe aircraft on 6 February 1942, she was towed into Oran, Algeria. Temporary repairs were subsequently made at Gibraltar. Bombed and sunk in the Atlantic Ocean (41°31′N 13°39′W) by Luftwaffe aircraft whilst under tow to the United Kingdom.

=== Fort Battle River ===
Fort Battle River was built by North Vancouver Ship Repairs Ltd. She was completed on 29 July 1942. Built for the MoWT, she was placed under the management of J. Cory & Sons Ltd. Torpedoed and sunk in the Atlantic Ocean (36°33′N 10°22′W) by U-410 on 6 March 1943.

=== Fort Beauharnois (I) ===
Fort Beauharnois was built by United Shipyards Ltd., Montreal. She was completed on 14 April 1944 as Whiteshell Park. Built for Park Steamship Co., she was placed under the management of Canadian Pacific Steamships Limited. To MoT in 1946 and placed under the management of Novocastria Shipping Co. Management changed in 1950 to W. H. Cockerline & Co. Sold later that year to Halifax Overseas Freighters Ltd., Halifax and renamed Fir Hill. Operated under the management of Counties Ship Management Ltd. Sold in 1964 to International Steamship Corp., London and renamed Universal Trader. Ran aground off Yasuoka, Japan on 7 December 1967 and consequently scrapped at Hirao, Japan in 1968.

=== Fort Beauharnois (II) ===
Fort Beauharnois was built by West Coast Shipbuilders Ltd. Launched on 31 August 1944 as Fort Grand Rapids, she was completed on 29 October as Cornish Park. Built for the Canadian Government, she was operated under the management of Park Steamship Co. To MoT in 1945 and renamed Fort Beauharnois. Operated under the management of Lyle Shipping Co. To the Admiralty in 1947. Entered service with the Royal Fleet Auxiliary. Withdrawn from service on 23 April 1962. Arrived at La Spezia, Italy on 9 November 1962 for scrapping by Cantieri Navali Santa Maria.

=== Fort Beausejour ===
Fort Beausejour was built by Marine Industries Ltd., Sorel, Quebec. She was completed on 20 November 1943. Built for the MoWT, she was placed under the management of Sir R. Ropner & Son. To MoT in 1946 and placed under the management of Goulandris Bros. Ltd. Sold in 1949 to G. & T. Shipping Ltd., Montreal, then sold later that year to Society Armadora del Norte, Panama and renamed Theogennitor. Sold in 1952 to Compagnie de Navigation Castro-Niva S.A., Panama. Reflagged to Greece in 1961. Sold in 1962 to Quebracho Steamship Co., Panama and renamed Lilian K. Operated under the management of Wheelock, Marden & Co. Renamed Golden Lily in 1964. Scrapped at Uchiumi, Japan in 1967.

=== Fort Beaver Lake ===
Fort Beaver Lake was built by Prince Rupert Drydock & Shipyard. She was completed as Westview Park on 20 October 1944. Transfer to MoWT not completed. To Park Steamship Co. Operated under the management of Seaboard Shipping Co. Sold in 1946 to Seaboard Owners Ltd., Vancouver and renamed Seaboard Enterprise. Reflagged to United Kingdom in 1954. Sold in 1957 to Doric Steamship Co., Monrovia and renamed Doric. Operated under the management of Ormos Shipping Co. Ltd. Reflagged to Greece in 1961. Sold in 1963 to Patagonia Compania de Inversiones, Andros and renamed Patagonia. Operated under the management of Goulandris. Sold in 1966 to Meandros Shipping Co., Famagusta and renamed Mary F. Operated under the management of Livanos. Sold in 1967 to Mary S Shipping Co., Famagusta. Operated under the management of E. Frangos. Scrapped at Shanghai, China in 1969.

=== Fort Bedford ===
Fort Bedford was built by Burrard Dry Dock Co. Ltd. She was completed on 10 March 1943. Built for the MoWT, she was placed under the management of J. Morrison & Son. To MoT in 1946, placed under the management of F. Dawson & Co. Sold in 1951 to Othrys Shipping Co., London and renamed Othrys. Placed under the management of Refast Steamship Co. Management changed to Marcou & Sons in 1956. Sold in 1957 to San Felicia Compania Navigacion, Monrovia and renamed Mount Othrys. Sold in 1961 to Oversea Shipping Co., Panama and renamed Alba Feliz. Scrapped at Hong Kong in 1963.

=== Fort Bell ===
Fort Bell was built by Burrard Dry Dock Co. Ltd. She was completed on 8 June 1943. Built for the MoWT, she was placed under the management of Dene Shipping Co. To MOT in 1946, placed under the management of W. A. Souter & Co. Management changed to Maclay & McIntyre Ltd. in 1950. Sold later that year to North Shipping Co., Newcastle upon Tyne and renamed North Cambria. Operated under the management of H. Roberts & Son. Sold in 1951 to Nihonkai Kisen K.K., Tokyo, Japan and renamed Canada Maru. Sold in 1964 to R. Takebayashi, Tokyo and renamed Tenyo Maru. Sold in 1965 to Asahi Kaiun K.K., Tokyo and renamed Asahi Maru. Scrapped at Sakaide, Japan in 1969.

=== Fort Bellingham ===
Fort Bellingham was a Victory ship built by Burrard Dry Dock Co. Ltd. She was completed on 17 August 1943. Built for the MoWT, she was placed under the management of Hain Steamship Co. Torpedoed and sunk in the Barents Sea (73°25′N 25°10′E) by U-360 and U-957 on 25 January 1944.

=== Fort Berens ===
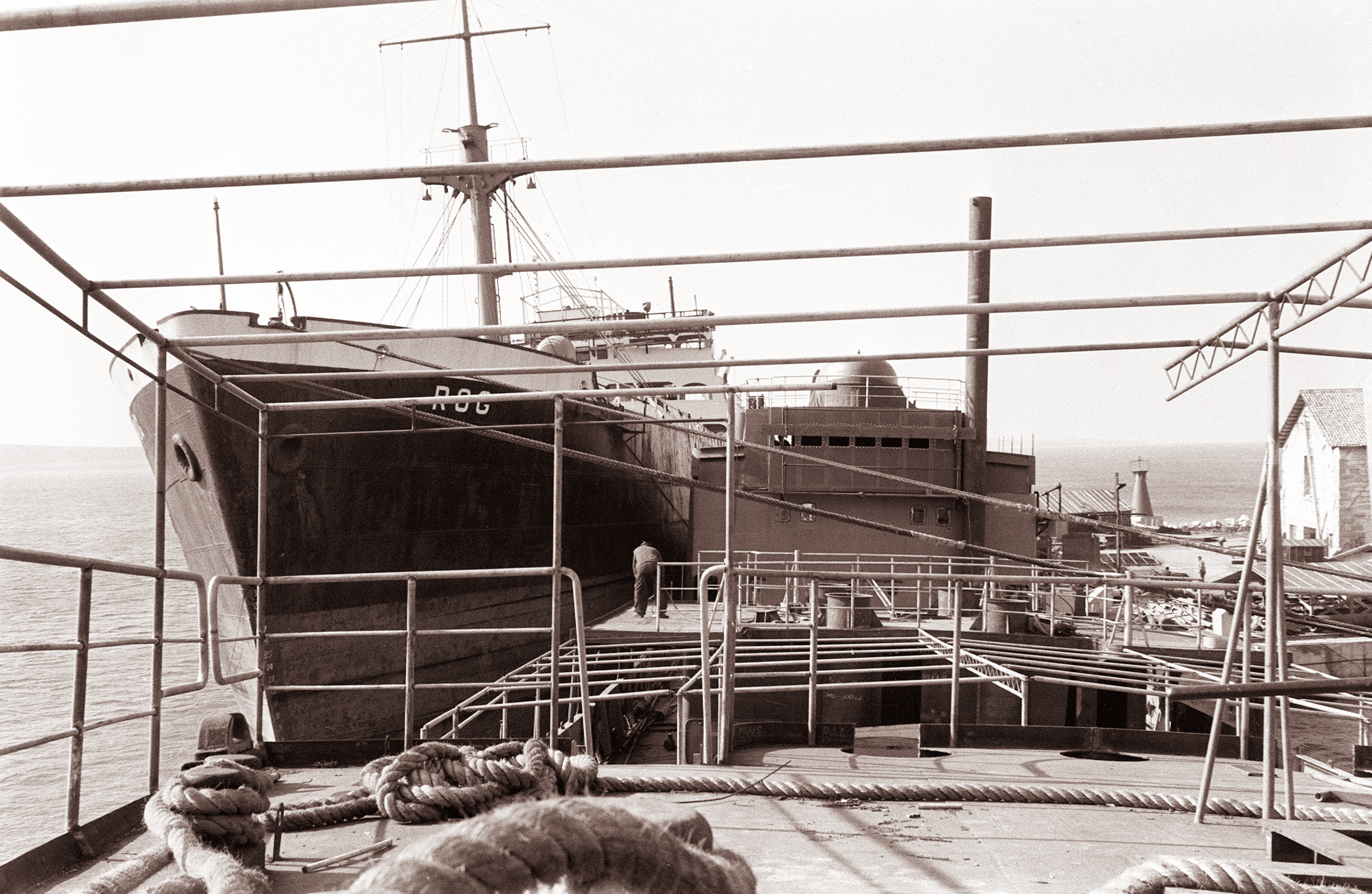
Rog

Fort Berens was built by Victoria Depot Machinery Co. Ltd., Victoria, British Columbia. She was completed on 20 October 1944 as Mission Park. Built for Park Steamship Co., she was placed under the management of Canadian Transport Co. Sold in 1947 to Australia, New Zealand Line, Montreal and renamed Ottawa Valley. Placed under the management of Trinder, Anderson & Co in 1950. Sold in 1954 to Splosna Plovba, Koper, Yugoslavia and renamed Rog. Sold in 1966 to William Brandts (Leasing) Ltd., Hong Kong and renamed Millstrident. Scrapped at Kaohsiung in 1969.

=== Fort Biloxi ===
Fort Biloxi was built by Burrard Dry Dock Co. Ltd. She was completed on 17 December 1943. Built for the MoWT, she was placed under the management of J. & J. Denholm Ltd. Sold in 1946 to Andros Shipping Co., Montreal and renamed Maria G. Renamed Riverside in 1947 and placed under the management of Atlantic Shipping Agencies Ltd. Sold in 1952 to Almarado Compania Armadora, Monrovia and renamed Doxa. Operated under the management of National Shipping & Trading Corp. Sold in 1953 to Western Transport Corp., Monrovia and renamed Makron. Sold in 1959 to Inter-Ocean Steamship Co., Monrovia and renamed Fray Martin. Reflagged to Peru in 1962, then sold later that year to Compania Maritima Carrena, Piraeus and renamed Aghios Demitris Scrapped at Izumiōtsu, Japan in 1967.

=== Fort Boise ===
Fort Boise was a Victory ship built by West Coast Shipbuilders Ltd. She was completed on 17 September 1943. Built for the MoWT, she was placed under the management of Hain Steamship Co. Sold in 1946 to Park Steamship Co. She ran aground east of Saint-Pierre, Saint Pierre and Miquelon on 23 August 1946 and was wrecked.

=== Fort Bourbon ===
Fort Bourbon was built by North Vancouver Ship Repairs Ltd. She was completed on 15 July 1942. Built for the MoWT, she was placed under the management of Headlam & Son. Transferred to USMC in 1948. Laid up in reserve. Scrapped at Beaumont in 1960.

=== Fort Brandon ===
Fort Brandon was built by Burrard Dry Dock Co. Ltd. She was completed on 16 June 1943. Built for the MoWT, she was placed under the management of W. H. Seager & Co. To MoT in 1946 and placed under the management of Houlder Bros. Chartered for 2 years in 1947 by Houlder Bros. Sold in 1948 to Laurentian Shipping Co., Montreal and renamed Laurentian Hill. Placed under the management of Fern Hill Steamship Co. in 1948. Sold in 1955 to Monovar Compania Navigacion, Monrovia and renamed Taygetos. Sold in 1960 to Pacific Trading Corp., Monrovia and renamed Aegean Sea. Sold to China later that year and renamed Hoping 79. Renamed Zhan Dou 79 in 1967. Reported scrapped in China in 1985.

=== Fort Brisebois ===
Fort Brisebois was built by Burrard Dry Dock Co. Ltd. She was completed on 23 March 1944. Built for the MoWT, she was placed under the management of J. & J. Denholm Ltd. Sold in 1946 to Acadia Overseas Freighters Ltd., Halifax and renamed Pictou County. Sold in 1950 to Compania de Navigacion Bayano, Monrovia and renamed Archimede. Sold in 1963 to Compania de Navigacion Grand Oriente Ltd., Monrovia and renamed Primavera. Scrapped at Hirao in 1968.

=== Fort Brule ===
Fort Brule was built by West Coast Shipbuilders Ltd. She was completed on 15 November 1942. Built for the MoWT, she was placed under the management of Sir R. Ropner & Co. Transferred to USMC in 1947. Sold in 1948 to Scindia Steam Navigation Co., Bombay, India and renamed Jalamoti. Sold in 1960 to Northwind Navigation Co., Panama and renamed Adawind. Sold in 1963 to Interocean Navigation Co., Panama and renamed Island Adventure. Scrapped at Kaohsiung in 1967.

=== Fort Brunswick ===
Fort Brunswick was built by Davie Shipbuilding & Repairing Co. Ltd. She was completed on 20 December 1943. Built for the MoWT, she was placed under the management of Allan, Black & Co. To MoT in 1946 and placed under the management of Mark Whitwell & Son. Sold in 1950 to Halifax Overseas Freighters Ltd. and renamed Mulberry Hill. Operated under the management of Counties Ship Management. Sold in 1964 to Antarctic (Bermuda) Shipping Co., remaining under the same managers. Scrapped at Split in 1966.

=== Fort Buckingham ===
Fort Buckingham was built by Burrard Dry Dock Co. Ltd. She was completed on 22 February 1943. Built for the MoWT, she was placed under the management of J. Constantine Steamship Line. Torpedoed and sunk in the Indian Ocean (8°19′N 66°40′E) by U-188 on 20 January 1944.

=== Fort Buffalo ===
Fort Buffalo was built by North Vancouver Ship Repairs Ltd. She was completed on 26 March 1943. Built for the MoWT, she was placed under the management of Turner, Brightman & Co. To MoT in 1946 and placed under the management of McCowan & Gross Ltd.. Sold in 1950 to North River Freighters Ltd., London and renamed Radnor. Operated under the management of Ships Finance & Management Co. Management transferred to Tropis Shipping Co. in 1961. Sold in 1964 to Geraldo Compania Navigazione S.A, Piraeus. Scrapped in China in 1967.

== Fort C ==
=== Fort Cadotte ===
Fort Cadotte was built by Burrard Dry Dock Co. Ltd. She was completed on 18 March 1943. Built for the MoWT, she was placed under the management of Sir R. Ropner & Co. To MoT in 1946 and placed under the management of Cunard-White Star Line. Management transferred to Cunard Steamship Company in 1949. Sold in 1950 to Nova Scotia Marine Enterprise Co., London and renamed Fry Hill. Operated under the management of Counties Ship Management Co. Sold in 1957 to Portofino Compania Navigation, Monrovia and renamed Akti. Operated under the management of Rethymnis & Kulukundis Ltd. Reflagged to Greece in 1960. Sold in 1961 to A. Frangistas & E. Athanasiou, Syra, Greece and renamed Gloria. sold in 1964 to Olistim Navigation Co., Syra and renamed Helen. Scrapped at Kawajiri, Japan in 1967.

=== Fort Camosun ===
Fort Camosun was built by Victoria Machinery Depot Co. Ltd., Victoria, British Columbia She was completed on 2 June 1942. Built for the MoWT, she was placed under the management of T. & J. Brocklebank. Torpedoed and damaged in the Pacific Ocean (47°22′N 125°30′W) on 20 June 1942. Torpedoed and damaged in the Indian Ocean (11°23′N 46°03′E) on 3 December 1943. Transferred to USMC in 1947. Laid up in reserve. Scrapped in the United States in 1960.

=== Fort Capot River ===
Fort Capot River was built by North Vancouver Ship Repairs Ltd. She was completed on 29 May 1943. Built for the MoWT, she was placed under the management of Larrinaga Steamship Co. To MoT in 1946 and placed under the management of Counties Ship Management Ltd. Sold in 1948 to Acadia Overseas Freighters Ltd and renamed Haligonian Duke. Operated under the management of H. Mathers & Son. Renamed Notting Hill in 1950 and placed under the management of Counties Ship Management Co. Management later transferred to Rethymnis & Kulukundis. Sold in 1957 to Transcontinental Oil Transportation Corp., Panama and renamed Cephus. Sold in 1960 to Transoceanic Finance & Trading Corp., Panama, then sold later that year to International Marine Transportation Corp., Panama and renamed Brisa Feliz. Sold in 1961 to The Keystone Shipping Co., Panama. Sold in 1964 to Panamerican Pacific Corp, Panama and renamed Zakia. Collided with the Greek tanker Hyperion off Cape St. Vincent, Portugal on 21 November 1964. She sank the next day at 36°48′N 8°48′W.

=== Fort Caribou ===
Fort Caribou was built by Burrard Dry Dock Co. Ltd. She was completed on 5 May 1943. Built for the MoWT, she was placed under the management of . Haldin & Philipps Ltd. To MoT in 1946, operated under the management of Goulandris Bros. Sold in 1949 to G. & T Shipping, Halifax. Sold in 1950 to Society Armadora del Norte. Panama and renamed Falcon. Sold in 1954 to San Pedro Compania Armadora, Panama. Reflagged to Greece in 1961. Sold in 1964 to Compania de Navigacion Sofia S.A., Panama and renamed Guna. Sold later that year to Triple Navigation Co., Panama and renamed Progress. Operated under the management of Venders Navigation Co. Wrecked in a cyclone 2 nautical miles (3.7 km) south of Madras, India on 3 November 1966.

=== Fort Carillon ===
Fort Carillon was built by Davie Shipbuilding & Repairing Co. She was completed on 5 May 1943. Built for the MoWT, she was placed under the management of Dodd, Thomson & Son. To MoT in 1946 and placed under the management of Union-Castle Mail Steamship Co. Sold in 1949 to Acadia Overseas Freighters Ltd., Halifax and renamed Haligonian King. Renamed Streatham Hill in 1950 and placed under the management of Counties Ship Management. Sold in 1964 to Marine Enterprises (Bermuda) Ltd, remaining under the same management. Scrapped at Santander in 1966.

=== Fort Carlton (I) ===
Fort Carlton was built by West Coast Shipbuilders Ltd. She was completed as Kootenay Park on 17 August 1942. Built for Park Steamship Co., she was placed under the management of Canadian-Australasian Line. To MoWT in 1944 and renamed Fort Nisqually. Operated under the management of McCowan & Gross. To MoT in 1946 and placed under the management of Goulandris Bros. Struck a mine and was damaged in the North Sea 72 nautical miles (133 km) north of Terschelling, Netherlands on 10 April 1950. Sold in 1950 to Kingsport Shipping Ltd., London and renamed Kingsmount. Sold in 1957 to Monteplata Compania Navigation, Monrovia and renamed Monteplata. Sold in 1960 To Atlantic Finance Corp., Monrovia and renamed Ekali. Sold in 1962 to The Santorini Shipping Co., Beirut, Lebanon and renamed Ioannis Nomikos. Sold in 1963 to Compania Naviera San Giovanni, Monrovia. Operated under the management of Nomikos. Scrapped at Alexandria, Egypt in 1974.

=== Fort Carlton (II) ===
Fort Carlton was built by North Vancouver Ship Repairs Ltd. She was completed on 16 June 1943. Built for the MoWT, she was placed under the management of Sir William Reardon Smith & Sons. To MoT in 1946, operated under the management of William Atkinson, Brown & Co. Sold in 1950 to Laurier Freighters Ltd, London and renamed Sorel. Operated under the management of Goulandris Bros. Sold in 1952 to Oakmount Steamship Co., London and renamed Surfside. Sold in 1953 to Montezuma Compania Armadora, Monrovia and renamed Thermitor. Reflagged to Greece in 1961. Scrapped at Onomichi, Japan in 1963.

=== Fort Cataraqui ===
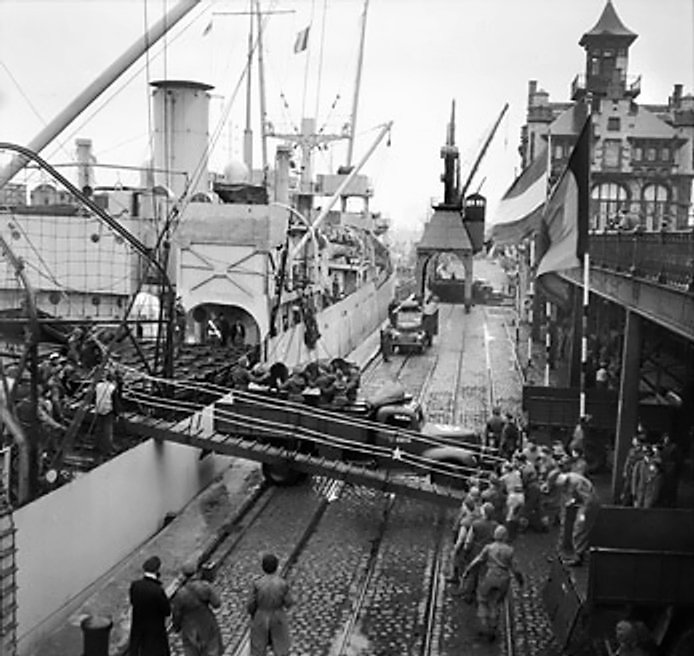
Fort Cataraqui at Antwerp, Belgium, 30 November 1944.

Fort Cataraqui was built by Davie Shipbuilding & Repairing Co. Ltd. She was completed on 22 October 1942. Built for the MoWT, she was placed under the management of Raeburn & Verel Ltd. To USMC in 1947. Laid up in reserve. Scrapped at Mobile, Alabama, United States in 1960.

=== Fort Cedar Lake ===
Fort Cedar Lake was built by North Vancouver Ship Repairs Ltd. She was completed on 12 December 1942. Built for the MoWT, she was placed under the management of Hain Steamship Co. Torpedoed and sunk in the Atlantic Ocean (52°14′N 32°15′W) by U-338 and U-665 on 17 March 1943.

=== Fort Chambly ===
Fort Chambly was built by Davie Shipbuilding & Repairing Co. Ltd. She was completed on 28 April 1942. Built for the MoWT, she was placed under the management of Port Line Ltd. To USMC in 1947. Laid up in reserve. Scrapped at Mobile in 1959.

=== Fort Charlotte ===
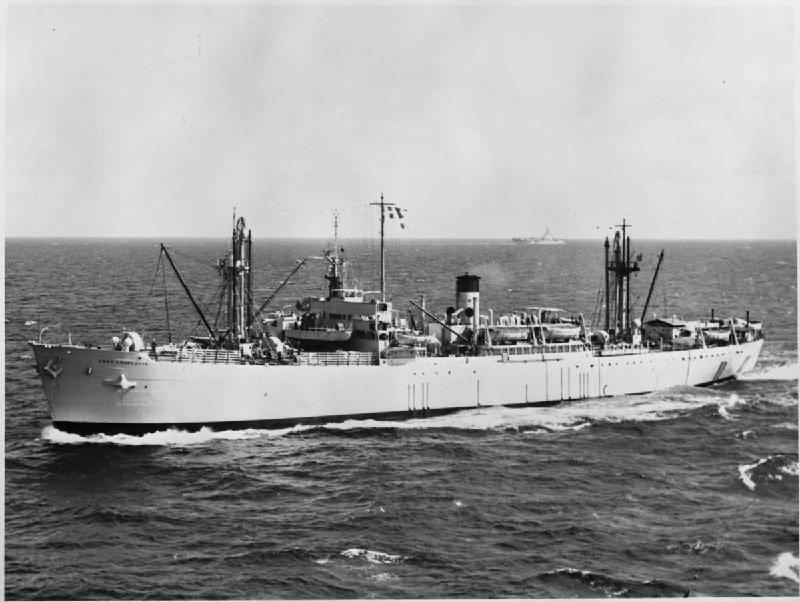
RFA Fort Charlotte

Fort Charlotte was built by North Vancouver Ship Repairs Ltd. She was completed on 5 April 1944 as Buffalo Park. Built for Park Steamship Co. To MoWT in 1945 and renamed Fort Charlotte. Operated under the management of Eastern & Australian Steamship Co. To Admiralty in 1947, serving with the Royal Fleet Auxiliary. Scrapped at Singapore in 1968.

=== Fort Charnisay ===
Fort Charnisay was built by Burrard Dry Dock Co. She was completed on 15 February 1943. Built for the MoWT, she was placed under the management of Anning Bros. To USMC in 1947. Sold in 1948 to Corrade Società di Navigazion, Genoa, Italy and renamed Mathilde Corrado. Scrapped at Tsuneishi, Japan in 1963.

=== Fort Chesterfield ===
Fort Chesterfield was built by Burrard Dry Dock Co. She was completed on 26 March 1943. Built for the MoWT, she was placed under the management of Hain Steamship Co. To MoT in 1946 and placed under the management of Goulandris Bros. Sold in 1949 to G. & T. Shipping Co., Montreal then sold later that year to Society Armadora del Norte, Panama and renamed Hawk. Operated under the management of Goulandris Bros. Sold in 1954 to Bahia Salinas Compania Navigation, Panama. Sold in 1965 to Cabahamas Corp. Ltd., Nassau, Bahamas. Renamed Cabahawk in 1966. Scrapped at Kaohsiung in 1968.

=== Fort Chilcotin ===
Fort Chilcotin was built by West Coast Shipbuilders Ltd. She was completed on 6 June 1942. Built for the MoWT, she was placed under the management of H. Hogarth & Sons. Torpedoed and sunk in the Atlantic Ocean (15°03′S 32°35′W) by U-172 on 24 July 1943.

=== Fort Chimo (I) ===
Fort Chimo was a tanker built by Canadian Vickers Ltd. She was completed as Point Pelee Park on 18 August 1942. Built for Park Steamship Co., she was placed under the management of Imperial Oil Ltd., Toronto. Sold in 1946 to Erling Hansen Rederi A/S, Kristiansand, Norway and renamed Ranella. Sold in 1954 to International Navigation Corp., Panama. Converted to a cargo ship and renamed Hudson River. Sold in 1960 to United Navigation Corp., Panama and renamed Formosan Star. Sold in 1961 to Taiwan Maritime Transportation Co., Keelung, Taiwan and renamed Tai Shing. Scrapped at Keelung, or Ghent in 1964.

=== Fort Chimo (II) ===
Fort Chimo was built by Marine Industries Ltd. She was completed as Belwoods Park on 6 December 1943. Built for Park Steamship Co., she was placed under the management of Furness, Withy & Co. To MoT in 1946 and placed under the management of South American Saint Line. Management changed to G. Heyn & Sons Ltd. in 1950. Sold later that year to Rex Shipping Co., London and renamed Brookhurst. Operated under the management of Hadjilias & Co. Sold in 1957 to Asturias Shipping Co., Monrovia and renamed Galicia. Scrapped at Mihara in 1967.

=== Fort Chipewyan ===
Fort Chipewyan was built by West Coast Shipbuilders Ltd. She was completed on 9 July 1942. Built for the MoWT, she was placed under the management of Idwal, Williams & Co. To USMC in 1947. Sold in 1949 to Bharat Line, Bombay and renamed Bharatraja. Scrapped at Bombay in 1962.

=== Fort Churchill ===
Fort Churchill was built by Burrard Dry Dock Co. Ltd. She was completed on 2 February 1942. Built for the MoWT, she was placed under the management of T. & J. Brocklebank Ltd. To United States Maritime Commission in 1947. To Indian Government in 1948, returned to the USMC in 1949. Laid up in reserve. Scrapped at Baltimore in 1958.

=== Fort Clatsop ===
Fort Clatsop was built by North Vancouver Ship Repair Ltd. She was completed on 27 August 1943. Built for the MoWT, she was placed under the management of J. & J. Denholm Ltd. Sold in 1946 to Montship Lines Ltd., Montreal and renamed Mont Clair. Sold in 1948 to Muhammadi Steamship Co., Karachi and renamed Husani, the renamed Al Husani later that year. Scrapped at Karachi in 1968.

=== Fort Columbia ===
Fort Columbia was built by Burrard Dry Dock Co. She was completed on 13 July 1943. Built for the MoWT, she was placed under the management of Charlton, McAllum & Co. Sold in 1946 to Park Steamship Co., Montreal. Sold in 1947 to Saguenay Terminals Ltd., Montreal. Renamed Sunrell in 1948. Reflagged to the United Kingdom in 1955. Sold in 1959 to Pacific Trading & Navigation Ltd., Monrovia and renamed Sula. Scrapped at Kaohsiung in 1969.

=== Fort Colville ===
Fort Colville was built by North Vancouver Ship Repairs Ltd. She was completed on 19 September 1943. Built for the MoWT, she was placed under the management of A. Holt & Co. Ltd. Converted to an Air Stores Issuing Ship between January and June 1944. To MoT in 1947 and placed under the management of Common Bros. Ltd. Sold in 1950 to Western Canada Steamship Co., Vancouver and renamed Lake Kootenay. Reflagged to the United Kingdom in 1954. Sold in 1957 to Maremblema Compagnia Navigation, Monrovia and renamed Andros Cygnet. Sold later that year to Compania Maritima Las Perlas, Monrovia and renamed Theoskepasti. Reflagged to Greece in 1961. Renamed Marietta T. in 1965. Scrapped at Hong Kong in 1966.

=== Fort Concord ===
Fort Concord was built by Davie Shipbuilding & Repairing Co. Ltd. She was completed on 16 November 1942. Built for the MoWT, she was placed under the management of Larrinaga Steamship Co. Torpedoed and sunk in the Arctic Ocean (46°05′N 25°20′W) by U-403 on 11 May 1943.

=== Fort Confidence ===
Fort Confidence was built by West Coast Shipbuilders Ltd. She was completed on 27 July 1942. Built for the MoWT, she was placed under the management of Larrinaga Steamship Co. Caught fire at Algiers, Algeria on 16 July 1943 and was beached. Declared a total loss. Subsequently scrapped in situ.

=== Fort Connolly ===
Fort Connolly was built by Burrard Dry Dock Co. Ltd. She was completed on 3 April 1943. Built for the MoWT, she was placed under the management of Gibbs & Co. To MoT in 1946 and placed under the management of Novocastria Shipping Co. Sold in 1950 to Nova Scotia Maritime Enterprise Co., London and renamed Marina Hill. Operated under the management of Counties Ship Management Co. Sold in 1957 to Portofino Compania Navigation, Monrovia and renamed Fotoulia. Operated under the management of Rethymnis & Kulukundis Ltd. Reflagged to Greece in 1960. Sold in 1961 to Panamanian Oriental Steamship Corp., Panama and renamed Alison. Operated under the management of Wheelock, Marden & Co. Sold in 1963 to Alexandra Navigation Corp, Panama. Operated under the management of W. H. Eddie Hsu. Scrapped at Kaohsiung in 1966.

=== Fort Constantine ===
Fort Constantine was a Victory ship built by Burrard Dry Dock Co. Ltd. She was launched on 11 March 1944. She was completed as a Refrigerated Stores Issuing Ship on 25 April 1944. Built for the MoWT, she was placed under the management of Ellerman & Bucknall Steamship Co. To Admiralty in 1949, transferred to Royal Fleet Auxiliary. Scrapped at Hamburg, West Germany in 1970.

=== Fort Conti ===
Fort Conti was built by Prince Rupert Dry Dock and Shipyard. She was completed as Earlscourt Park on 30 April 1944. Built for Park Steamship Co., Montreal, she was placed under the management of Empire Shipping Co. Sold in 1946 to Western Canada Steamships Ltd., Vancouver and renamed Lake Chilliwack. Renamed Mossel Bay in 1950 and placed under the management of Sir R. Ropner & Co. (Management) Ltd. Sold in 1954 to Liberian Freighters Corp., Monrovia and renamed Noutsi. Ran aground 2 nautical miles (3.7 km) from Constanţa, Romania on 28 March 1965. Declared a total loss.

=== Fort Coulonge ===
Fort Coulonge was built by United Shipyards Ltd., Montreal. She was completed on 31 May 1943. Built for the MoWT, she was placed under the management of Sir R. Ropner & Co. To MoT in 1949 and placed under the management of W. H. Cockerline Ltd. Sold in 1950 to Ottawa Steamship Co., London and renamed Andover Hill. Operated under the management of Counties Ship Management Ltd. Management transferred to Coulouthros Ltd in 1952. Sold in 1961 to Marvenida Compania Navigation, Monrovia and renamed Louira, remaining under the same manager. Sold in 1964 to Steering Line Co., Monrovia and renamed Surabaja Steer. Sold in 1965 to Treasure Maritime Corp., Monrovia and renamed Beryl. Scrapped at Hirao in 1970.

=== Fort Covington ===
Fort Covington was built by United Shipyards Ltd., Montreal. She was completed on 21 October 1943. Built for the MoWT, she was placed under the management of Counties Ship Management. To MoT in 1946, operated under the management of Idwal Williams & Co. Management transferred to C. Strubin & Co. in 1950. Sold later that year to Bedford Overseas Freighters Ltd., London and renamed Bedford Earl. Sold in 1955 to Calliroy Navigation Ltd., London. Driven onto a reef in the Ryuku Islands, Japan in a typhoon on 26 September 1956. Declared a constructive total loss and sold.

=== Fort Crevecour ===
Fort Crevecour was built by West Coast Shipbuilders Ltd. She was completed on 17 August 1943. Built for the MoWT, she was placed under the management of H. M. Thomson. Sold in 1946 to Triton Steamship Co., Montreal and renamed Trimont. Sold in 1949 to Society Armadora del Norte, Panama and renamed Eagle. Operated under the management of Goulandris Bros (Hellas) Ltd. Sold in 1954 to Compania Maritima de Navegacion Conval S.A., Panama. Operated under the management of V. N. Goulandris. Sold in 1957 to Compania de Navegacion Almirante, Panama and renamed Seacrow. Scrapped at Kaohsiung in 1968.

=== Fort Crevier ===
Fort Crevier was built by United Shipyards Ltd. She was completed on 12 October 1943. Built for the MoWT, she was placed under the management of J. Robinson & Sons. Severely damaged by the explosion of Fort Stikine at Bombay on 14 April 1944, she was subsequently used as a hulk. Scrapped at Bombay in 1948.

=== Fort Crown Point ===
Fort Crown Point was built by United Shipyards Ltd. She was completed as Alder Park on 14 April 1944. Built for Park Steamship Co., Montreal, she was placed under the management of Canadian Pacific Steamships. Sold in 1946 to Dominion Shipping Co., Montreal and renamed Arthur Cross. Sold in 1964 to Pacific Trading & Navigation Co., Monrovia. Scrapped at Hong Kong in 1970.

=== Fort Cumberland ===
Fort Cumberland was built by Burrard Dry Dock Co. Ltd. She was completed on 24 May 1943. Built for the MoWT, she was placed under the management of Lyle Shipping Co. Sold to her managers in 1950 and renamed Cape Franklin. Sold in 1956 to West Africa Navigation Co., Monrovia and renamed African Sky. Operated under the management of Salvatores & Racah SRL. Sold in 1960 to General Navigation Ltd., Monrovia. Scrapped at Yokosuka, Japan in 1966.

== Fort D ==
=== Fort Daer ===
Fort Daer was built by North Vancouver Ship Repairs Ltd. She was completed as Whiterock Park on 11 October 1944. Built for Park Steamship Co., she was placed under the management of Johnson, Walton Steamship Co., Vancouver. Sold to her managers in 1946 and renamed Tantara. Sold in 1951 to Compania Maritima Samsoc Ltda, Monrovia and renamed Pelopidas. Operated under the management of Hermes Steamship Agency. Sold in 1956 to West African Navigation Ltd., Monrovia and renamed African Count. Trapped in the Suez Canal in November 1956 as a result of the Suez Crisis. Released on 28 January 1957. Scrapped at Izumiōtsu in 1963.

=== Fort Dauphin ===
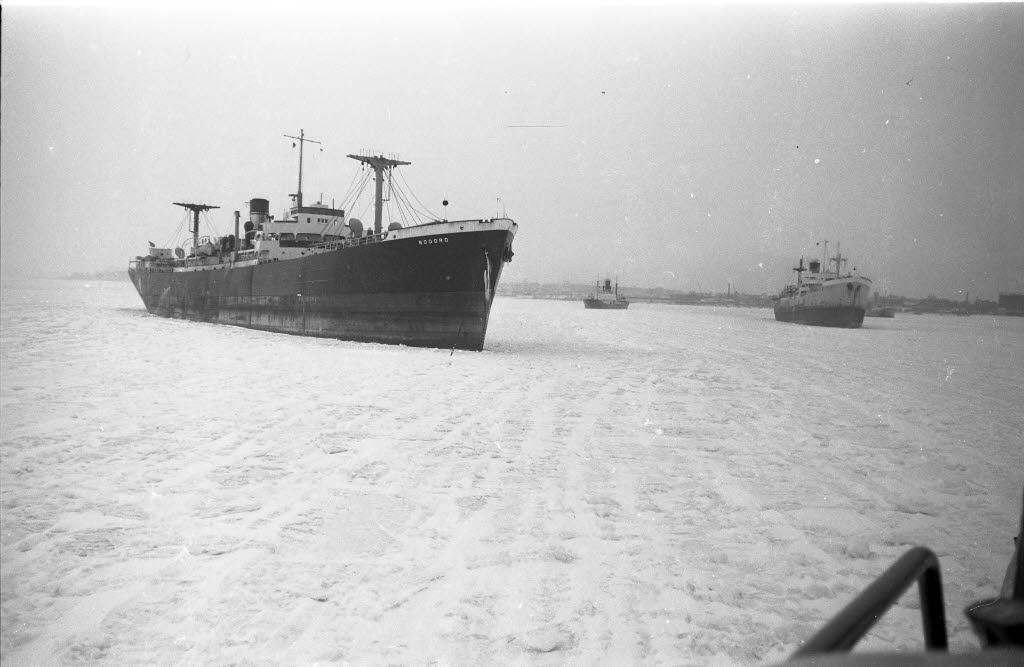
Bodoro

Fort Dauphin was built by Burrard Dry Dock Co. Ltd. She was completed on 1 June 1943. Built for the MoWT, she was placed under the management of Constantine Steamship Lines. To MoT in 1946, operated under the management of McCowen & Gross. Sold in 1950 to Watergate Steam Shipping Co. and renamed Warkworth. Operated under the management of R. S. Dalgleish. Sold in 1957 to Compania Maritima Amaconte, Monrovia and renamed Bodoro. Operated under the management of Joaquin Punta Naya. Collided with Beaver State in Chesapeake Bay on 27 January 1967 and was beached. Declared a constructive total loss, she was scrapped at Portsmouth, Virginia, United States in 1969.

=== Fort Dearborn ===
Fort Dearborn was built by Burrard Dry Dock Co. Ltd. She was completed on 17 January 1944. Built for the MoWT, she was placed under the management of Haldin & Philipps Ltd. Torpedoed and damaged in the North Sea (50°40′N 0°31′E by Kriegsmarine E-boats on 30 July 1944. Sold in 1946 to Park Steamship Co., Montreal. Sold in 1947 to Kerr-Silver Lines (Canada) Ltd., Vancouver and renamed Manx Navigator. Sold in 1949 to the Union of South Africa Government's Railways & Harbours Administration and renamed Aloe. Sold in 1955 to Southern Steamships Ltd., Durban, Union of South Africa and renamed President Steyn. Operated under the management of E. P. Nomikos. Reflagged to Greece in 1962. Sold later that year to Istanbul Vapurculuk Sirketi Ltd., Istanbul, Turkey and renamed Demirel. Driven ashore at the Ahırkapı Lighthouse on 23 September 1964. Refloated and found to be severely damaged. Scrapped at Haliç, Turkey in June 1965.

=== Fort Dease Lake ===
Fort Dease Lake was built by Burrard Dry Dock Co. Ltd. She was completed on 19 April 1943. Built for the MoWT, she was placed under the management of Buries Markes Ltd. To MoT in 1946, placed under the management of McCowen & Gross Ltd. Sold in 1948 to Ivor Shipping Co., Montreal and renamed Ivor Jenny. Operated under the management of Quebec Steamship Lines. Reflagged to the United Kingdom in 1951. Sold in 1955 to Novor Shipping Co., London and renamed Novor Jenny. Operated under the management of Chandris Ltd. Sold in 1958 to Marifortuna Navigation, Piraeus and renamed Jenny. Operated under the management of A. J. & D. J. Chandris. Scrapped at Mihara in 1961.

=== Fort Douglas ===
Fort Douglas was built by Victoria Machinery Depot Co. Ltd. She was completed on 8 August 1942. Built for the MoWT, she was placed under the management of Haldin & Philipps Ltd. To USMC in 1946. Placed in reserve. Scrapped at Baltimore in 1958.

=== Fort Drew ===
Fort Drew was built by North Vancouver Ship Repairs Ltd. She was completed on 29 December 1942. Built for the MoWT, she was placed under the management of Maclay & McIntyre Ltd. Damaged by a mine in the Baltic Sea (35°52′N 14°47′E) on 6 September 1943. To USMC in 1948. Placed in reserve. Scrapped at Mobile in 1961.

=== Fort Dunvegan ===
Fort Dunvegan

Fort Dunvegan was a Victory ship built by Burrard Dry Dock Co. Ltd. She was launched on 28 June 1944. Built for the MoWT, she was placed under the management of Ellerman & Bucknall Steamship Co. To the Admiralty in 1946, converted to a Stores Issuing Ship. To Royal Fleet Auxiliary in 1951. Scrapped at Kaohsiung in 1968.

=== Fort Duquesne ===
Fort Duquesne

Fort Duquesne was a Park ship built by West Coast Shipbuilders Ltd. Launched as Queensborough Park on 28 September 1944, she was completed on 25 November. Built for the MoWT, she was placed under the management of George Nisbet & Co. Renamed Fort Duquesne in 1945. Management transferred to Alfred Holt & Co. in 1947. To Admiralty on 15 September 1947 and operated by the Royal Fleet Auxiliary. Scrapped at Temise, Belgium by Jos Boel et Fils in 1967.

== Fort E ==
=== Fort Edmonton ===
Fort Edmonton was a Victory ship built by Burrard Dry Dock Co. Ltd. She was completed on 13 September 1944. Built for the MoWT, she was placed under the management of Ellerman & Bucknall Steamship Co. Sold in 1947 to Federal Commerce & Navigation Co., Montreal and renamed Federal Voyager. Operated under the management of Watts, Watts & Co from 1955. Scrapped at Onomichi in 1961.

=== Fort Ellice ===
Fort Ellice was built by Burrard Dry Dock Co. Ltd. She was completed on 3 June 1942. Built for the MoWT, she was placed under the management of Lambert Bros. Ltd. To USMC in 1946, laid up in reserve. Sold in 1948 to Great Eastern Shipping Co., Bombay and renamed Jag Vijay. Scrapped at Bombay in 1960.

=== Fort Enterprise ===
Fort Enterprise was built by West Coast Shipbuilders Ltd. She was completed on 6 April 1943. Built for the MoWT, she was placed under the management of Hall Bros. To MoT in 1949, operated under the management of Dalhousie Steam & Motor Ship Co. Sold in 1951 to Tavistock Shipping Co., London and renamed Tavistock. Operated under the management of Purvis Shipping Co. Sold in 1952 to Island Shipping Co., London and renamed Southwick. Operated under the management of Ivanovic & Co. Sold in 1956 to T. & J. Brocklebank and renamed Mahsud. Sold in 1961 to Grand Shipping Co. Ltd., Hong Kong and renamed Marine Traveller. Sold in 1962 to The Herald Shipping Co. Ltd, Hong Kong and renamed Bandahara. Renamed Otone in 1964. Scrapped at Hirao in 1966.

=== Fort Erie ===
Fort Erie was built by United Shipyards Ltd. She was completed on 21 May 1943. Built for the MoWT, she was placed under the management of Frank S. Dawson Ltd. To MoT in 1946, operated under the management of Jubilee Steam Navigation Co. Sold in 1951 to Fort Erie Steamship Co., London and renamed Maidenhead. Operated under the management of Hadoulis Ltd. Sold in 1957 to Aguaruta Compania Navigation, Monrovia and renamed Aristefs. Operated under the management of Rethymnis & Kulukundis Ltd. Sold in 1960 to Pergamos Compania Navigation, Beirut. Sold in 1966 to Tung Lee Navigation Co., Panama and renamed Tung Yih. Scrapped at Keelung in 1967.

=== Fort Esperance (I) ===
Fort Esperance was built by North Vancouver Ship Repairs Ltd. She was completed as Green Gables Park on 7 July 1943. Built for Park Steamship Co., she was placed under the management of Canada Shipping Co. Sold in 1946 to Dolphin Steamship Co., Montreal and renamed Papachristidis Vassilios. Broke down in the Indian Ocean in July 1948 and drifted for ten days. Taken in tow for Fremantle, Australia by Kybra. Renamed Worldtrotter in 1949. Sold in 1953 to Efcarriers Co., Monrovia and renamed Marcos. Reflagged to Greece in 1959. Sold in 1960 to Transfruit Shipping Co., Piraeus. Sold in 1963 to Marprimera Compania Navigation, Piraeus and renamed Esperanza. Sold in 1965 to Kwong Hing Shipping Co., Panama and renamed Kwong Lee. Scrapped at Kaohsiung in 1968.

=== Fort Esperance (II) ===
Fort Esperance was built by United Shipyards Ltd. She was completed on 10 November 1943. Built for the MoWT, she was placed under the management of Allan, Black & Co. To MoT in 1946. Operated under the management of Goulandris Bros. Management transferred to George Nesbit & Co. in 1950. Sold later that year to Moorland Navigation Co., London and renamed Nimaris. Operated under the management of J. P. Haldoulis. Sold in 1956 to Cortes Compania Navigation, Panama and renamed Captain Nicos. Sold in 1963 to Republic Log Carriers Ltd., Monrovia and renamed Luzon Logger. Sold in 1965 to Maritenia Shipping Co., Port-au-Prince, Haiti and renamed Judy. Reflagged to Burundi in 1966. Sold in 1968 to Société d'Avances Commerciales, Bujumbura, Burundi. Reflagged to Somalia in 1969. Sold later that year to Nafin Ltda, Mogadishu, Somalia and renamed Buna. Scrapped at Shōdoshima, Japan in 1969.

== Fort F ==
=== Fort Fairford ===
Fort Fairford was built by North Vancouver Ship Repairs Ltd. She was completed on 15 January 1943. Built for the MoWT, she was placed under the management of Morel Ltd. To USMC in 1947. Sold in 1948 to Compagnia Uruguaya de Comercio y Maritima, Montevideo, Uruguay and renamed General Rivera. Operated under the management of Aristotle Onassis. Sold in 1950 to Oceanic Transport Corp., Monrovia. Scrapped at La Spezia in 1967.

=== Fort Fidler ===
Fort Fidler was built by North Vancouver Ship Repairs Ltd. She was completed on 15 May 1943. Built for the MoWT, she was placed under the management of Smith, Hogg & Co. Torpedoed and damaged in the Mediterranea Sea (36°45′N 0°55′E) by U-616 on 14 May 1944, she put in to Oran. Repaired at Lisbon Portugal in 1945. Sold in 1946 to Sociedade Geral de Comercia, Industria e Transportes, Lisbon and renamed Alcoutim. Scrapped at Bilbao, Spain in 1971.

=== Fort Finlay ===
Fort Finlay was built by West Coast Shipbuilders Ltd. She was completed on 6 January 1943. Built for the MoWT, she was placed under the management of Sir. R. Ropner & Co. To USMC in 1948. Laid up in reserve. Scrapped at Beaumont in 1959.

=== Fort Fitzgerald ===
Fort Fitzgerald was built by West Coast Shipbuilders Ltd. She was completed on 9 March 1943. Built for the MoWT, she was placed under the management of E. R. Management Co. Bombed and/or torpedoed and sunk in the Mediterranea Sea (36°42′N 1°17′E by Luftwaffe aircraft on 4 October 1943.

=== Fort Fork ===
Fort Fork was built by Burrard Dry Dock Co. Ltd. She was completed on 20 September 1942. Built for the MoWT, she was placed under the management of Sir W. R. Smith & Sons. To United States Maritime Commission in 1947. Laid up in reserve. Sold in 1948 to Unione Società per Azioni, Genoa and renamed Punta Amica. Operated under the management of Piero Ravano. Scrapped at La Spezia in 1968.

=== Fort Franklin ===
Fort Franklin was built by West Coast Shipbuilders Ltd. She was completed on 1 December 1942. Built for the MoWT, she was placed under the management of Dodd, Thomson & Co. Torpedoed and sunk in the Indian Ocean (22°36′S 51°22′E) by U-181 on 16 July 1943.

=== Fort Fraser ===
Fort Fraser was built by Burrard Dry Dock Co. Ltd. She was completed on 24 April 1942. Built for the MoWT, she was placed under the management of Mongo Campbell & Co. To USMC in 1948. Laid up in reserve. Scrapped at Beaumont in 1959.

=== Fort Frederick ===
Fort Frederick was built by North Vancouver Ship Repairs Ltd. She was completed on 28 November 1942. Built for the MoWT, she was placed under the management of James Gardiner & Co. To USMC in 1947. Sold in 1948 to Compania Ligure di Navigazione, Genoa and renamed Dodin Marsano. Operated under the management of Andrea Marsano. Renamed Golfo di Augusta in 1957. Sold in 1961 to Compania Generale di Navigazione, Cagliari, Sardinia, Italy, Scrapped at La Spezia in 1968.

=== Fort Frobisher ===
Fort Frobisher was built by North Vancouver Ship Repairs Ltd. She was completed on 3 February 1943. Built for the MoWT, she was placed under the management of Maclay & McIntyre Ltd. To USMC in 1948. Laid up in reserve. Scrapped at Baltimore in 1962.

=== Fort Frontenac (I) ===
Fort Frontenac was built by Marine Industries Ltd. She was completed as Port Royal Park on 2 October 1942. Built for Park Steamship Co., Montreal, she was placed under the management of Elder Dempster Lines Ltd. To MoT in 1946, operated under the management of Tavistock Shipping Ltd. Sold in 1950 to Rex Shipping Co., London and renamed Fernhurst. Operated under the management of Hadjilias & Co. Sold in 1958 to Grenehurst Shipping Co., London and renamed Navarra. Sold in 1961 to Anthares Maritima S.A. de Navigacion, Buenos Aires, Argentina. Scrapped at Hendrik-Ido-Ambacht, Netherlands in 1963.

=== Fort Frontenac (II) ===
Fort Frontenac was built by Marine Industries Ltd. She was completed on 8 September 1943. Built for the MoWT, she was placed under the management of J. & C. Harrison Ltd. To MoT in 1946. Operated under the management of South American Saint Line Ltd. Sold in 1950 to Laurentian Marine Co., London and renamed Laurentian Valley. Operated under the management of Fern Hill Steamship Co. Sold in 1957 to Corona Compania di Navigation, Monrovia and renamed Aegean Sea. Sold in 1958 to "Uzeda" Società di Navigazione, Catania, Sicily, Italy and renamed Achille. Operated under the management of Matteo Scudari. Scrapped at La Spezia in 1968.

== Fort G ==
=== Fort Gaspereau ===
Fort Gaspereau was built by Burrard Dry Dock Co. Ltd. She was completed on 12 January 1943. Built for the MoWT, she was placed under the management of Watts, Watts & Co. To USMC in 1947. Sold in 1948 to Società Ligure di Navigazione, Ligura, Italy and renamed Orfeo. Sold in 1963 to Philippines President Lines, Manila, Philippines and renamed President Quirino. Renamed Elpidio Quirino in 1968. Renamed Quirino later that year, then renamed Liberty Two in 1969. Scrapped at Alicante, Spain in 1969.

=== Fort George ===
Fort George was built by Burrard Dry Dock Co. Ltd. She was completed on 18 April 1942. Built for the MoWT, she was placed under the management of Sir R. Ropner & Co. To USMC in 1948. Laid up in reserve Scrapped at Baltimore in 1962.

=== Fort Gibraltar ===
Fort Gibraltar was built by North Vancouver Ship Repairs Ltd. She was completed on 26 September 1942. Built for the MoWT, she was placed under the management of C. T. Bowring & Co. To United States Maritime Commission in 1947. Sold in 1948 to "Italia" Società per Azioni di Navigazione, Genoa and renamed Alcione. Operated under the management of Fratelli D'Amico. Sold in 1951 to Marittima Capodorso S.p.A., Rome. Scrapped at Trieste, Italy in 1963.

=== Fort Glenlyon ===
Fort Glenlyon was built by West Coast Shipbuilders Ltd. She was completed on 21 April 1943. Built for the MoWT, she was placed under the management of H. M. Thomson, Edinburgh. Sold to her managers in 1950 and renamed Glenlyon. Sold in 1959 to Ilhami Soker, Istanbul and renamed Soker. Sold in 1963 to Cerrahogullari Umumi Nakliyat Vapurculuk ve Ticaret, Istanbul and renamed M. Eregli. Scrapped at Istanbul in 1967.

=== Fort Glenora ===
Fort Glenora was built by West Coast Shipbuilders Ltd. She was completed on 4 May 1943. Built for the MoWT, she was placed under the management of Trader Navigation Co. To MoT in 1946. Operated under the management of W. A. Souter & Co. Management transferred to Stott, Mann & Fleming Ltd in 1950. Sold later that year to N. G. Kyriakides Shipping Co., London and renamed George K.. Operated under the management of Salvatores & Racah SRL. Sold in 1956 to West Africa Navigation Co., Monrovia and renamed African Marquis. Ran aground on Kasos Island, Greece (35°23′N 26°59′E, broke in two and sank on 25 February 1968.

=== Fort Gloucester ===
Fort Gloucester was built by West Coast Shipbuilders Ltd. She was completed on 18 May 1943. Built for the MoWT, she was placed under the management of W. A. Souter & Son. Torpedoed and damaged by Kriegsmarine E-boats in the English Channel on 18 August 1944. To MoT in 1948. Operated under the management of Weider, Hopkins & Co. Sold in 1950 to Bedford Overseas Freighters Ltd., London and renamed Bedford Prince. Struck a rock in the Gulf of Paria on 14 June 1953 and was beached on 19 June. Refloated on 28 August and towed in to New Orleans, Louisiana. Declared a constructive total loss. Scrapped in Baltimore in December 1953.

=== Fort Good Hope ===
Fort Good Hope was built by Burrard Dry Dock Co. Ltd. She was completed on 8 May 1942. Built for the MoWT, she was placed under the management of R. Chapman & Son. Torpedoed and sunk in the Atlantic Ocean (10°19′N 80°16′W by U-159 on 11 June 1942.

=== Fort Grahame ===
Fort Grahame was built by North Vancouver Ship Repairs Ltd. She was completed on 19 February 1943. Built for the MoWT, she was placed under the management of B. J. Sutherland & Co. To USMC in 1948. Sold later that year to Società Italiana di Armamento "Sidarma", Venice and renamed Marco Foscarini. Sold in 1959 to Maritenia Shipping Co., Šibenik, Yugoslavia and renamed Promina. Operated under the management of Slobodna Plovibda. Scrapped at Split in 1966.

=== Fort Grand Rapids ===
See Fort Beauharnois (II).

=== Fort Grant ===
Fort Grant was built by West Coast Shipbuilders Ltd. She was completed on 1 June 1943. Built for the MoWT, she was placed under the management of David Alexander & Sons. To MoT in 1946. Operated under the management of J. & J. Denholm Ltd. Sold in 1950 to Northeastern Freighters Ltd., London and renamed Commodore Grant. Operated under the management of J. P. Hadoulis Ltd. Sold in 1961 to Montelindo Compania Navigation, Beirut and renamed Sidon. Renamed Sidon Star later that year. Sold in 1963 to Malma Compania Navigazione, Piraeus and renamed Aethon. Sold in 1966 to Aktor Shipping Co., Famagusta, Cyprus. Scrapped in China in 1967.

=== Fort Green Lake (I) ===
Fort Green Lake was built by West Coast Shipbuilders Ltd. She was completed as Mount Douglas Park on 15 June 1943. Built for Park Steamship Co., Montreal, she was placed under the management of Canadian Transport Co. To MoT in 1946. Operated under the management of Hall Bros. Wrecked on the Preparis Shoal, Indian Ocean (14°48′N 93°43′E) on 19 August 1946.

=== Fort Green Lake (II) ===
Fort Green Lake was built by North Vancouver Ship Repairs Ltd. She was completed as Bridgeland Park on 14 September 1944. Built for Park Steamship Co., Montreal, she was placed under the management of Canada Shipping Co. Sold in 1946 to Elder Dempster Lines (Canada) Ltd and renamed Cambray. Reflagged to the United Kingdom in 1950. Sold in 1960 to Compania di Navigation "Somerset" S.A., Panama and renamed Simeto. Operated under the management of S. Tuillier. Scrapped at Bilbao in 1971.

=== Fort Grouard ===
Fort Grouard was built by North Vancouver Ship Repairs Ltd. She was completed on 15 April 1943. Built for the MoWT, she was placed under the management of W. Runciman & Co. To MoT in 1946. Operated under the management of R. S. Dalgleish Ltd. Sold in 1950 to Larix Shipping Co., London and renamed Sea Crest. Operated under the management of Embiricos Ltd. Sold in 1952 to Federal Commerce & Navigation Co., London and renamed Ernest G. Pathy. Sold in 1955 to West Africa Navigation Co., Monrovia and renamed African Duke. Operated under the management of Salvatores & Racah SRL. Scrapped at Yokosuka in 1964.

== Fort H ==
=== Fort Halkett ===
Fort Halkett was built by Burrard Dry Dock Co. Ltd. She was completed on 9 November 1942. Built for the MoWT, she was placed under the management of J. & J. Denholm Ltd. Torpedoed and sunk in the Atlantic Ocean (9°30′S 25°50′W) by U-185 on 6 August 1943.

=== Fort Hall ===
Fort Hall was built by North Vancouver Ship Repairs Ltd. She was completed on 4 August 1943. Built for the MoWT, she was placed under the management of E. R. Management Co. Sold in 1946 to Park Steamship Co., Montreal, then sold later that year to Argonaut Navigation Co., Montreal and renamed Argofax. Operated under the management of John C. Yemelos. Reflagged to the United Kingdom in 1951. Sold in 1959 to Strovoli Compania Navigation, Piraeus and renamed Strovoli. Operated under the management of A. Lusi Ltd. Scrapped in Osaka, Japan in 1967.

=== Fort Harrison ===
Fort Harrison was built by North Vancouver Ship Repairs Ltd. She was completed as Goldstream Park on 7 November 1944. Built for Park Steamship Co., Montreal, she was placed under the management of North Pacific Shipping Co. Sold in 1946 to Elder Dempster Lines (Canada) Ltd., Montreal and renamed Cottrell. Reflagged to the United Kingdom in 1950. Sold in 1961 to Compania de Navigation "Somerset", Panama and renamed Santagata, Scrapped at Blyth, United Kingdom in 1971.

=== Fort Henley ===
Fort Henley was built by United Shipyards Ltd. She was completed on 18 November 1943. Built for the MoWT, she was placed under the management of Sir R. Ropner & Son. To MoT in 1946. Operated under the management of Ropner Shipping Co. Sold in 1950 to Halifax Overseas Freighters Ltd., London and renamed Pine Hill. Operated under the management of Counties Ship Management. Rescued eight crew of Panamanian cargo ship Jankiki, which foundered 11 nautical miles (20 km) north west of the Berlengas Islands, Portugal on 29 November 1953. Sold in 1964 to Trafalgar Steamship Co., London and renamed Newmoat. Operated under the management of Tsavliris Shipping Ltd. Scrapped at La Spezia in 1969.

=== Fort Highfield (I) ===
Fort Highfield was built by North Vancouver Ship Repairs Ltd. She was completed as Yoho Park on 22 July 1943. Built for Park Steamship Co., Montreal, she was placed under the management of Canadian Australasian Line. To MoWT in 1944 and renamed Fort Highfield. Operated under the management of Dalhousie Steam & Motorship Co. to MoT in 1950, operated under the management of W. H. Seager & Co. Sold in 1951 to Dartmouth Overseas Freighters Ltd., London and renamed Darfield. Operated under the management of Nomikos (London) Ltd. Sold in 1952 to Windsor Overseas Freighters Ltd., London, remaining under the management of Nomikos. Ran aground north of Los Angeles, California, United States on 28 February 1954. Refloated on 2 March and towed in to Los Angeles. Declared a constructive total loss, she was scrapped at Terminal Island, California in May 1954.

=== Fort Highfield (II) ===
Fort Highfield was built by North Vancouver Ship Repairs Ltd. She was completed as Yoho Park on 22 July 1944. Built for Park Steamship Co., Montreal, she was placed under the management of Canadian Australasian Line. Sold in 1946 to Western Canada Steamships Ltd., Vancouver and renamed Lake Winnipeg. Sold in 1953 to Altos Mares Compania Navigation, Monrovia and renamed Americana. Operated under the management of A. Lusi Ltd. Reflagged to Greece in 1961. Scrapped at Etajima, Japan in 1967.

=== Fort Howe ===
Fort Howe was built by Burrard Dry Dock Co. Ltd. She was completed on 10 November 1942. Built for the MoWT, she was placed under the management of F. C. Strick & Co. Torpedoed and sunk in the Mediterranean Sea (37°19′N 6°40′E) by U-410 on 30 September 1943.

=== Fort Hudson's Hope ===
Fort Hudson's Hope was built by Victoria Machinery Depot Co. Ltd. She was completed on 26 October 1942. Built for the MoWT, she was placed under the management of Glen & Co. To USMC in 1947. Sold in 1948 to "Italia" Società per Azioni di Navigazione, Genoa and renamed Vega. Sold in 1950 to "Italnavi" Società di Navigazione per Azioni, Genoa and renamed Italvega. Rebuilt as a motor vessel in 1952. Sold in 1966 to Lloyd's Africa Ltd., Monrovia and renamed Bellport. Scrapped at Faslane, United Kingdom in 1972.

== Fort I ==
=== Fort Island ===
Fort Island was built by Burrard Dry Dock Co. Ltd. She was completed on 15 March 1944. Built for the MoWT, she was placed under the management of Hain Steamship Co. Sold in 1946 to Montship Lines Ltd., Montreal and renamed Mont Rolland. Sold in 1949 to Gestioni Esercizio Navigazione, Genoa and renamed Maria Paolina G. Scrapped at La Spezia in 1960.

== Fort J ==
=== Fort Jasper ===
Fort Jasper was built by North Vancouver Ship Repairs Ltd. She was completed on 12 March 1943. Built for the MoWT, she was placed under the management of Common Bros. Ltd. To USMC in 1948. Laid up in reserve. Scrapped at Beaumont in 1959.

=== Fort Jemseg ===
Fort Jemseg was built by Burrard Dry Dock Co. Ltd. She was completed on 21 January 1943. Built for the MoWT, she was placed under the management of Hain Steamship Co. Torpedoed and sunk in the Atlantic Ocean (53°18′N 40°24′W) by U-238 on 23 September 1943.

== Fort K ==
=== Fort Kaskaskia ===
Fort Kaskaskia was built by West Coast Shipbuilding Ltd. She was completed on 3 September 1942. Built for the MoWT, she was placed under the management of Counties Ship Management Co. Torpedoed and damaged in the English Channel by a Kriegsmarine E-boat on 31 July 1944. Sold in 1946 to Acadia Overseas Freighters, Halifax and renamed Hants County. Sold in 1949 to Israel-America Line, Haifa, Israel and renamed Tel Aviv. Operated under the management of Shoham Sherutey Hayam Ltd. Sold in 1953 to Cargo Ships El-Yarn Ltd., Haifa. Sold in 1961 to Lamda Shipping Enterprises Corp., Piraeus and renamed Anatoli. Operated under the management of Livanos. Sold in 1965 to Niki Marine Operations Ltd., Famagusta and renamed Sunrise. Remained under the management of Livanos. Scrapped at Shanghai, China in 1970.

=== Fort Kilmar ===
Fort Kilmar was a Victory ship built by Burrard Dry Dock Co. Ltd. She was completed on 25 May 1944. Built for the MoWT, she was placed under the management of Ellerman & Bucknall Steamship Co. Sold in 1947 to Andros Shipping Co., Montreal and renamed Islandside. Operated under the management of March Shipping Agency Ltd. Sold in 1952 to Delphin Compania Navigation, Panama and renamed Catherine M.S. Operated under the management of Evans Shipping Corp. Ran aground off the Nojimazaki Lighthouse, Japan (34°53′N 139°55′E on 10 February 1954. Declared a constructive total loss and sold for scrap.

=== Fort Kootenay ===
Fort Kootenay was built by Burrard Dry Dock Co. Ltd. She was completed on 17 August 1942. Built for the MoWT, she was placed under the management of J. Morrison & Son. To USMC in 1948. Sold later that year to Navigazione "Alta Italia" Società Anonime, Genoa and renamed Mongioia. New turbine steam engine fitted in 1950. Sold in 1966 to Astra Carriers Corp., Monrovia and renamed Montjorge. Renamed Segre later that year. Scrapped at La Spezia in 1967.

=== Fort Kullyspell ===
Fort Kullyspell was built by West Coast Shipbuilders Ltd. She was completed on 2 August 1943. Built for the MoWT, she was placed under the management of Hall Bros. Sold in 1946 to Park Steamship Co., Halifax. Sold in 1947 to Acadia Overseas Freighters Ltd., Halifax and renamed Westminster County. Sold in 1949 to Israel-America Line, Haifa and renamed Yaffo. Operated under the management of Shoham Sherutey Hayam Ltd. Sold in 1953 to Cargo Ship El-Yarn Ltd., Haifa. Ran aground in Baffu Bay (5°10′N 9°02′W) on 24 March 1953. Declared a total loss. Refloated by 22 March 1957. Taken in to Monrovia. No further trace.

== Fort L ==
=== Fort la Baye ===
Fort la Baye was built by West Coast Shipbuilders Ltd. She was completed on 17 September 1943. Built for the MoWT, she was placed under the management of Counties Ship Management Co. Sold in 1947 to Park Steamship Co., Montreal, then sold later that year to Acadia Overseas Freighters Ltd., Halifax and renamed Digby County. Operated under the management of I. H. Mather & Som. Sold in 1950 to Compania Polyna Maritima, Monrovia and renamed Travelstar. Operated under the management of Triton Shipping Inc. Ran aground in Buckner Bay (26°08′N 127°51′E) on 16 October 1954. Caught fire the next day. Declared a constructive total loss, salvage was abandoned in January 1955.

=== Fort Lac la Ronge ===
Fort Lac la Ronge was built by Burrard Dry Dock Co. Ltd. She was completed on 19 June 1942. Built for the MoWT, she was placed under the management of J. Constantine Steamship Line. Damaged by a manned torpedo, or a radio-controlled boat, in the English Channel (49°22′N 0°21′W). Taken in to Appledore, United Kingdom and laid up. To USMC in 1948. Sold to British owner later that year and scrapped at Briton Ferry, United Kingdom.

=== Fort la Cloche ===
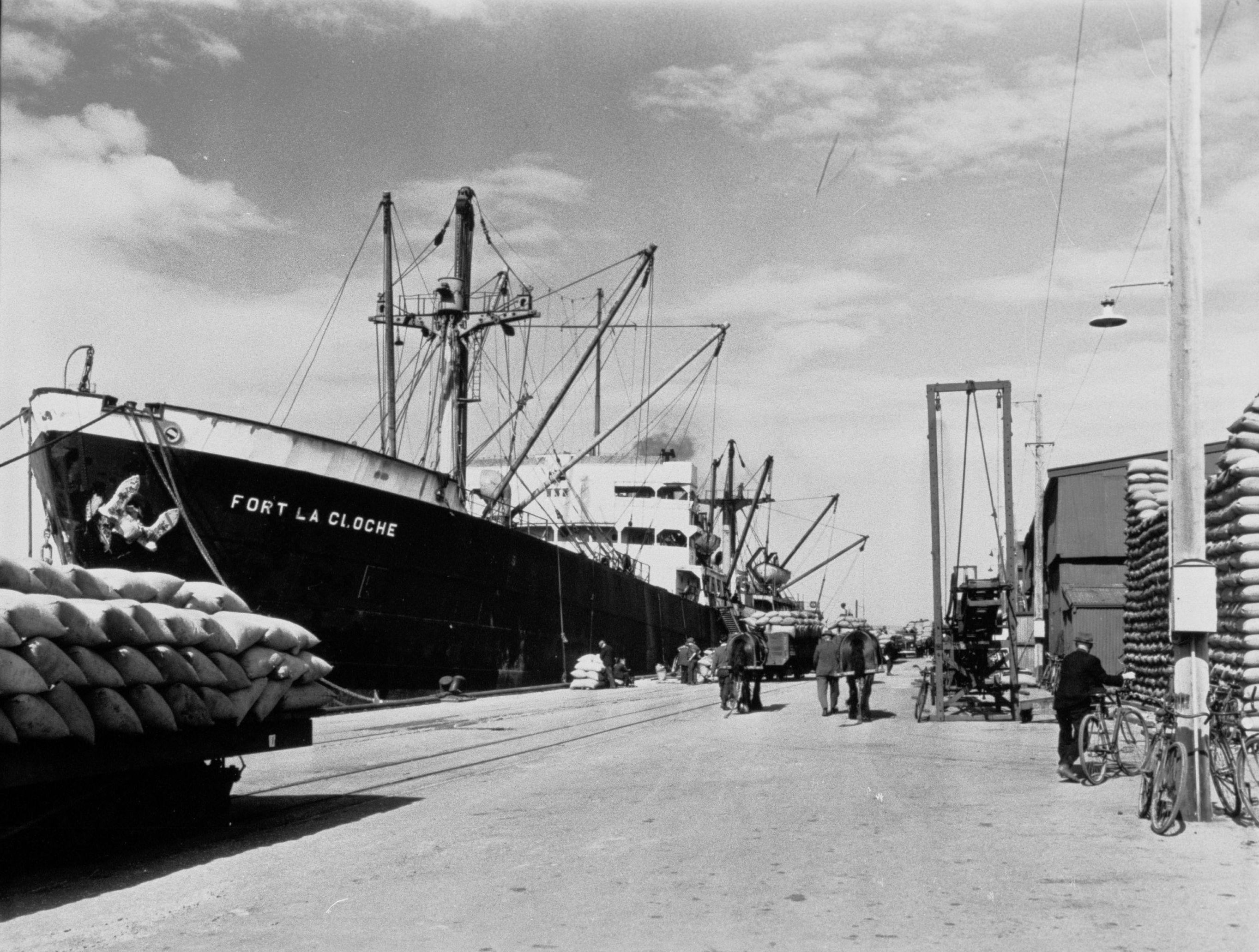
Fort la Cloche

Fort la Cloche was built by Marine Industries Ltd. She was completed on 30 April 1944. Built for the MoWT, she was placed under the management of Buries Markes Ltd. To MoT in 1946. Operated under the management of McCowen & Gross Ltd. Sold in 1950 to Nova Scotia Marine Enterprise Co. and renamed Akti Hill. Operated under the management of Counties Ship Management Co. Sold in 1958 to Mérida Compania Navigation, Monrovia and renamed Cape Dreapon. Operated under the management of George Nicolau Ltd. Reflagged to Greece in 1961. Ran aground in Long Island Sound on 1 February 1961. She was refloated on 12 February, but declared a constructive total loss and sold for scrap.

=== Fort la Have ===
Fort la Have was a Victory ship built by Burrard Dry Dock Co. Ltd. She was completed on 7 March 1944. Built for the MoWT, she was placed under the management of Hain Steamship Co. Sold in 1946 to Park Steamship Co., Montreal. Sold in 1946 to Lunham & Moore (Canada) Ltd., Montreal and renamed Angusglen. Renamed Cape Melan in 1954 and placed under the management of Lyle Shipping Co. Ltd. Sold in 1955 to A. C. Hadjipateras, Puerto Limon, Costa Rica and renamed Aghios Spyridon. Operated under the management of Harry Hadjipateras Bros. Reflagged to Greece in 1959. Ran aground west of Havana, Cuba (22°53′N 83°58′W) on 27 May 1959 and caught fire. Fire extinguished on 30 May. Refloated on 19 June. Declared a constructive total loss. Scrapped at Troon, United Kingdom in 1961.

=== Fort Lajoie ===
Fort Lajoie was built by Burrard Dry Dock Co. Ltd. She was completed on 15 December 1942. Built for the MoWT, she was placed under the management of Lyle Shipping Co. Sunk in the air raid on Bari on 2 December 1943. Subsequently refloated and repaired. To USMC in 1948. Laid up in reserve. Scrapped at Mobile in 1959.

=== Fort la Maune ===
Fort la Maune was built by Davie Shipbuilding & Repairing Co. Ltd. She was completed on 25 May 1942. Built for the MoWT, she was placed under the management of Booth Steamship Co. Torpedoed and sunk in the Indian Ocean (13°04′N 56°30′E) by U-188 on 25 January 1944.

=== Fort la Montee ===
Fort la Montee was built by North Vancouver Ship Repairs Ltd. She was completed on 29 October 1942. Built for the MoWT, she was placed under the management of J. & C. Harrison Ltd. Caught fire and exploded at Algiers on 4 August 1943. The stern section was sunk by gunfire

=== Fort Langley ===
Fort Langley was a Victory ship built by Victoria Machinery Co. Ltd. Launched as Montebello Park, on 31 October 1944, she was completed on 18 May 1945. Built for the MoWT, she was placed under the management of A. Holt & Co. Ltd. To MoT in 1946, operated under the management of George Nisbet & Co. To Admiralty in 1950. To Royal Fleet Auxiliary in 1954. Scrapped at Bilbao in 1970.

=== Fort la Prairie (I) ===
Fort la Prairie was built by Davie Shipbuilding & Repairing Co. Ltd. She was completed as Prince Albert Park on 30 June 1942. Built for Park Steamship Co. Montreal, she was placed under the management of Elder Dempster Lines Ltd. To MoT in 1946. Operated under the management of Tavistock Shipping Ltd. Sold in 1951 to Champlain Freighters Ltd., London and renamed Champlain. Operated under the management of Hadoulis Ltd. Wrecked at Yulin, Hainan, China (18°17′N 109°33′E) in a typhoon on 26 June 1955. Not abandoned by her crew until August.

=== Fort la Prairie (II) ===
Fort la Prairie was built by United Shipyards Ltd. She was completed on 23 November 1943. Built for the MoWT, she was placed under the management of Common Bros. To MoT in 1946. Operated under the management of Dalhousie Steam & Motor Ship Co. Sold in 1950 to Halifax Overseas Freighters Ltd., London and renamed Elm Hill. Operated under the management of I. H. Mather & Son Ltd. Management later transferred to Counties Ship Management Co. Sold in 1964 to Atlantic (Bermuda) Shipping Co., remaining under the same manager. Scrapped at Hirao in 1967.

=== Fort la Reine ===
Fort la Reine was built by Burrard Dry Dock Co. Ltd. She was completed on 7 July 1942. Built for the MoWT, she was placed under the management of J. Constantine Steamship Line. Torpedoed and sunk in the Atlantic Ocean (18°30′N 75°30′W) by U-658 on 17 August 1942.

=== Fort la Tour ===
Fort la Tour was built by Marine Industries Ltd. She was completed on 19 May 1943. Built for the MoWT, she was placed under the management of Stephens, Sutton Ltd. To MoT in 1946. Operated under the management of William Brown, Atkinson & Co. Management transferred to J. Constantine Steamship Line in 1949. Sold in 1951 to Megantic Freighters Ltd., London and renamed Assimina K. Operated under the management of J. P. Hadoulis Ltd. Renamed Jean Baptiste in 1959. Scrapped at Blyth in 1960.

=== Fort la Traite ===
Fort la Traite was built by West Coast Shipbuilders Ltd. She was completed on 18 December 1942. Built for the MoWT, she was placed under the management of Evan Thomas, Radcliffe & Co. To USMC in 1947. Sold in 1948 to "Italnavi" Società di Navigazione per Azioni, Genoa and renamed Italsole. Rebuilt as a motor vessel in 1949. Sold in 1965 to Lloyd's Africa Ltd., Monrovia and renamed Freeport. Scrapped at Blyth in 1960.

=== Fort Lawrence ===
Fort Lawrence was built by Burrard Dry Dock Co. Ltd. She was completed on 4 January 1943. Built for the MoWT, she was placed under the management of F. C. Strick & Co. To USMC in 1948. Laid up in reserve. Scrapped at Mobile in 1958.

=== Fort Lennox ===
Fort Lennox was built by Marine Industries Ltd. She was completed on 18 September 1943. Built for the MoWT, she was placed under the management of J. & C. Harrison Ltd. To MoT in 1946. Operated under the management of Goulandris Bros. Sold in 1948 to Vancouver Oriental Line, Montreal and renamed Caribou County. Operated under the management of I. H. Mathers & Son. Renamed Harrow Hill in 1950, remaining under the management of Mathers. Later placed under the management of Counties Ship Management Co. Sold in 1960 to Empresa Naviera La Libertad, Panama and renamed Silver Peak. Ran aground in the Pacific Ocean (25°44′N 123°30′W) on 12 April 1967. Declared a total loss and sold for scrap.

=== Fort Liard ===
Fort Liard was built by Victoria Machinery Depot. She was completed on 14 September 1942. Built for the MoWT, she was placed under the management of Christian Salvesen Ltd. To USMC in 1948. Laid up in reserve. Scrapped at Beaumont, or Baltimore in 1968.

=== Fort Livingstone ===
Fort Livingstone was built by Burrard Dry Dock Co. Ltd. She was completed on 28 November 1942. Built for the MoWT, she was placed under the management of Wing Line Ltd. To USMC in 1948. Sold later that year to Società Italiano di Armamenta "Sidarma", Venice and renamed Pietro Orseolo. Sold in 1960 to Maritenia Shipping Co., Šibenik and renamed Bor. Scrapped at Split in 1970.

=== Fort Longueil ===
Fort Longueil was built by United Shipyards Ltd. She was completed on 8 December 1942. Built for the MoWT, she was placed under the management of J. Chambers & Co. Torpedoed and sunk in the Indian Ocean (approximately 10°00′S 68°00′E) by U-532 on 19 September 1943.

=== Fort Louisbourg ===
Fort Louisbourg was built by Canadian Vickers Ltd. She was completed on 27 April 1942. Built for the MoWT, she was placed under the management of W. Thomson & Co. To USMC in 1948. Laid up in reserve. Scrapped at Baltimore in 1960.

== Fort M ==
=== Fort Machault ===
Fort Machault was built by Burrard Dry Dock Co. Ltd. She was completed on 9 November 1942. Built for the MoWT, she was placed under the management of Larrinaga Steamship Co. Sold in 1946 to Park Steamship Co., Montreal. Sold in 1947 to Seagull Steamship Co. of Canada and renamed L'Emerillon. Ran aground on the Sorelle Rocks, Tunisia (37°23′N 8°35′E) on 18 February 1949. Declared a total loss.

=== Fort Mackinac (I) ===
Fort Mackinac was built by Burrard Dry Dock Co. Ltd. She was completed as Beaton Park on 29 October 1943. Built for Park Steamship Co., Montreal, she was placed under the management of North Pacific Shipping Co. Sold in 1946 to Western Canada Steamships Ltd., Vancouver and renamed Lake Babine. Sold in 1951 to Andros Shipping Co., Montreal and renamed Mountainside. Operated under the management of Goulandris Bros. Sold in 1953 to Arucana Compania Armadora S.A., Panama and renamed Santa Marina. Operated under the management of Orion Shipping & Trading Co. Inc. Sold in 1959 to Assimio Compania de Vapores, Panama and renamed Assimina P. Sold in 1960 to Mina Compania de Vapores, Panama. Reflageed to Greece in 1965 and renamed Assimina Piangos. Scrapped at Kaohsiung in 1968.

=== Fort Mackinac (II) ===
Fort Mackinac was built by West Coast Shipbuilders Ltd. She was completed as Dominion Park on 13 August 1944. Built for Park Steamship Co., Montreal, she was placed under the management of Canadian-Australasian Line, Vancouver. Sold to her managers in 1946 and renamed Waihemo. Operated under the management of Canadian-Australasian Line. Sold in 1962 to Union Steamship Company of New Zealand, Wellington. Sold in 1966 to Pacific Trading & Navigation Ltd., Panama and renamed Maris Susana. Sold in 1969 to Pac-Trade Navigation Co., Panama. Scrapped at Kaohsiung in 1972.

=== Fort Maissoneuve ===
Fort Maissoneuve was built by United Shipyards Ltd. She was completed on 6 May 1943. Built for the MoWT, she was placed under the management of Chellew Navigation Co. Struck a mine and sank in the Scheldt (51°24′N 3°21′E) on 15 December 1944. Wreck removed between January and December 1962.

=== Fort Marin ===
Fort Marin was built by North Vancouver Ship Repairs Ltd. She was completed on 27 October 1943. Built for the MoWT, she was placed under the management of E. R. Management Co. Sold in 1946 to Park Steamship Co., Montreal. Sold in 1947 to Argonaut Navigation Co., Montreal and renamed Argojohn. Operated under the management of John C. Yemelos. Reflagged to the United Kingdom in 1951. Sold in 1960 to Strovili Compania Navigazione, Piraeus and renamed Kertis. Scrapped in Kaohsiung in 1967.

=== Fort Massac ===
Fort Massac was built by Burrard Dry Dock Co. Ltd. She was completed on 17 September 1943. Built for the MoWT, she was placed under the management of J. Cory & Sons. Collided with Thornaby and sank in the North Sea off the Sunk Lightship (51°53′N 1°32′E) on 1 February 1946.

=== Fort Mattagami ===
Fort Mattagami was built by North Vancouver Ship Repairs Ltd. She was completed 18 May 1944. Built for the MoWT, she was placed under the management of J. Cory & Sons. Sold in 1948 to Acadian Overseas Freighters Ltd., Halifax and renamed Haligonian Princess. Operated under the management of I. H. Mathers Ltd. Renamed Denmark Hill in 1950 and placed under the management of Counties Ship Management Co. Sold in 1964 to Marine Enterprises (Bermuda) Ltd, remaining under the same management. Scrapped at Kaohsiung in 1968.

=== Fort Maurepas ===
Fort Maurepas was built by West Coast Shipbuilders Ltd. She was completed on 4 September 1942. Built for the MoWT, she was placed under the management of J. & C. Harrison Ltd. To USMC in 1947. Sold in 1948 to "Corrado" Società di Navigazione, Genoa and renamed Rosa Corrado. Sold in 1963 to Sicularma Società di Navigazione per Azioni, Palermo, Sicily and renamed Tindari. Scrapped at Vado Ligure in 1965.

=== Fort McDonnell ===
Fort McDonnell was a Victory ship built by Burrard Dry Dock Co. Ltd. She was completed on 1 August 1944. Built for the MoWT, she was placed under the management of A. Holt & Co. Sold in 1947 to Park Steamship Co., Montreal, then sold later that year to Andros Shipping Co., Montreal and renamed Cliffside. Sold in 1951 to Valedor Compania Navigation, Panama and renamed Cavodoro. Operated under the management of Capeside Steamship Co. Ltd. Sold in 1953 to Compania Europa Comercial y Maritima, Panama and renamed Captain Lukis. Operated under the management of D. J. Falafos. Reflagged to Greece in 1960. Scrapped at Kaohsiung in 1968.

=== Fort McLeod ===
Fort McLeod was built by Yarrows Ltd., Esquimalt, British Columbia. She was completed on 30 June 1942. Built for the MoWT, she was placed under the management of Glen Line Ltd. Torpedoed and sunk in the Indian Ocean (2°01′N 77°06′E) by I-162 on 3 March 1944.

=== Fort McLoughlin ===
Fort McLoughlin was built by Burrard Dry Dock Co. Ltd. She was completed on 19 May 1942. Built for the MoWT, she was placed under the management of Common Bros Ltd. To USMC in 1948, then sold later that year to Società Italiano di Armamenta "Sidarma", Venice and renamed Sebastiano Venier. Sold in 1950 to Marittima Napoletana Società di Navigazione, Naples. Renamed Airone in 1952. Operated under the management of Giovanni Longobardo. Sold in 1959 to Raffaele Romano, Naples. Scrapped at Vado Ligure in 1966.

=== Fort McMurray ===
Fort McMurray was built by Burrard Dry Dock Co. Ltd. She was completed on 27 August 1942. Built for the MoWT, she was placed under the management of Morel Ltd. To USMC in 1947. Laid up in reserve. Sold in 1948 to "Italia" Società per Azioni di Navigazione, Genoa and renamed Pegaso. Sold in 1950 to Achille Lauro, Naples. Scrapped at La Spezia in 1967.

=== Fort McPherson ===
Fort McPherson was built by North Vancouver Ship Repairs Ltd. She was completed on 29 April 1943. Built for the MoWT, she was placed under the management of Counties Ship Management Co. Bombed and damaged in the North Sea (50°02′N 0°36′W)) on 11 June 1942. Damaged at London by a V-1 flying bomb on 26 July 1944. To MoT in 1946, operated under the management of United Africa Company. Sold in 1950 to Waverley Overseas Freighters and renamed Labrador. Operated under the management of Fafalios Ltd. Sold in 1956 to Compania Filiori di Navigation, Chios, Greece and renamed Poseidon. Sold in 1960 to Phoebus D. Kyprianou, Beirut and renamed Marichristina. Sold in 1969 to Arab Star Shipping Co., Famagust and renamed Ibrahim K.. Ran aground at Tocra, Libya on 18 December 1969 and broke up.

=== Fort Medutic ===
Fort Medutic was built by Burrard Dry Dock Co. Ltd. She was completed on 29 January 1943. Built for the MoWT, she was placed under the management of J. Morrison & Son. To USMC in 1947. Laid up in reserve. Scrapped at Mobile in 1959.

=== Fort Miami (I) ===
Fort Miami was built by West Coast Shipbuilders Ltd. She was completed as Windermere Park on 12 November 1943. Built for Park Steamship Co, Montreal, she was placed under the management of Canadian Shipping Co. Sold in 1946 to Western Canada Steamships Ltd, Vancouver and renamed Lake Sumas. Sold in 1949 to Compania Carreto de Navigation, Panama and renamed Katherine. Sold in 1961 to Orient Shipping Corp., Beirut and renamed Nagos. Operated under the management of M. Livanos. Sold in 1965 to Zannis Compania Navigation, Beirut. Operated under the management of A. Halicoussis. Scrapped at Hong Kong in 1968.

=== Fort Miami (II) ===
Fort Miami was built by West Coast Shipbuilders Ltd. She was completed as Mount Robson Park on 7 September 1944. Built for Park Steamship Co., Montreal, she was placed under the management of Canadian Australasian Line. Sold in 1946 to Western Canada Steamships Ltd., Vancouver and renamed Lake Manitou. Sold in 1951 to Andros Shipping Ltd, Montreal and renamed Cliffside. Operated under the management of Goulandris Bros. Sold in 1952 to Alianza Compania Armadora, Monrovia and renamed Niki. Sold in 1953 to Star Steamship Corp., Monrovia and renamed Star. Sold in 1961 to West Africa Oil Carriers Corp., Monrovia and renamed Nalon. Scrapped at Kaohsiung in 1967.

=== Fort Miami (III) ===
Fort Miami was built by North Vancouver Ship Repairs Ltd. She was launched as Fort Rouge and completed as Mount Robson Park on 27 August 1942. Built for Park Steamship Co., Montreal, she was placed under the management of Canadian Australasian Line. To MoWT and renamed Fort Miami in September 1944. Operated under the management of Evan Thomas, Radcliffe & Co. Management changed to Cunard Whit Star Line in 1946 and then to George Nisbet & Co. in 1950. Sold later that year to Rex Shipping Co. and renamed Midhurst. Operated under the management of I. H. Mathers & Son. Management later transferred to Hadjilias & Co. Sold in 1957 to Asturias Shipping Co., Monrovia and renamed Andalusia, remaining under the management of Hadjilias. Reflagged to Greece in 1961. Sold in 1964 to Compania de Navigation Phoenix, Panama and renamed Sevilla. Scrapped at Keelung in 1967.

=== Fort Michipicoten ===
Fort Michipicoten was built by Marine Industries Ltd. She was completed on 30 September 1943. Built for the MoWT, she was placed under the management of Maclay & McIntyre Ltd. To MoT in 1946. Operated under the management of A. Crawford & Co. Sold in 1950 to Halifax Overseas Freighters Ltd. and renamed Oak Hill. Operated under the management of I. H. Mathers & Son. Management later transferred to Counties Ship Management Co. Ltd. Sold in 1964 to Maropimo Compania Navigation, Piraeus and renamed Agenor. sold in 1966 to Agenor Shipping Co. Ltd, Famagusta. Scrapped in Singapore in 1969.

=== Fort Mingan ===
Fort Mingan was built by Davie Shipbuilding & Repairing Co. Ltd. She was completed on 3 May 1943. Built for the MoWT, she was placed under the management of E. R. Management Co. To MoT in 1946. Operated under the management of Counties Ship Management Co. Sold in 1949 to Acadia Overseas Freighters Ltd., Halifax and renamed Haligonian King. Operated under the management of I. H. Mathers Ltd. Renamed Streatham Hill in 1950 and placed under the management of Counties Ship Management Co. Sold in 1964 to Marine Enterprises (Bermuda) Ltd, remaining under the same management. Scrapped at Santander in 1966.

=== Fort Missanabie ===
Fort Missanabie was built by Marine Industries Ltd. She was completed on 15 July 1943. Built for the MoWT, she was placed under the management of T. Dunlop & Co. Torpedoed and sunk in the Mediterranean Sea (38°20′N 16°38′W) by U-453 on 19 May 1944.

=== Fort Moose ===
Fort Moose was built by United Shipyards Ltd. She was completed on 30 October 1943. Built for the MoWT, she was placed under the management of Larrinaga Steamship Co. To MoT in 1946. Operated under the management of United Africa Co. Sold in 1948 to Acadia Overseas Freighters Ltd., Halifax and renamed Haligonian Prince. Operated under the management of I. H. Mather & Son. Renamed Tulse Hill in 1950 and placed under the management of Counties Ship Management Co. Sold in 1959 to Ocean Shipping Service Ltd, remaining under the same management. Sold in 1966 to Argo Hellas Shipping Co., Piraeus and renamed Astronaftis. Sold in 1968 to Empresa Navegacion Mambisa, Havana and renamed Carlos Manuel de Cespedes. Scrapped at Vinaroz, Spain in 1975.

=== Fort Mumford ===
Fort Mumford was built by Prince Rupert Drydock & Shipyard. She was compleded on 12 December 1942. Built for the MoWT, she was placed under the management of Sir W. Reardon Smith & Sons. Torpedoed and sunk in the Indian Ocean (10°00′N 71°00′E) by I-27 on 20 March 1943. She was on her maiden voyage.

=== Fort Musquarro ===
Fort Musquarro was built by Marine Industries Ltd. She was completed on 16 April 1944. Built for the MoWT, she was placed under the management of C. Strubin & Co. To MoT in 1946. Operated under the management of Cunard White Star Line. Management transferred to Maclay & McIntyre Ltd in 1949. Sold in 1950 to Canadian Tramp Shipping Co., London and renamed West Hill. Operated under the management of Counties Ship Management Co. Sold in 1957 to Nestor Compania Navigation, Panama and renamed Rio Doro. Operated under the management of Somerset Shipbrokers Ltd. Sold in 1960 to Monteleones Compania Navigation, Piraeus. Scrapped at Hirao in 1963.

== Fort N ==
=== Fort Nakasley ===
Fort Nakasley was built by West Coast Shipbuilders Ltd. She was completed on 23 March 1943. Built for the MoWT, she was placed under the management of J. & J. Denholm Ltd. Sold in 1950 to Meadowside Shipping Co., London and renamed Argodon. Operated under the management of A. Lusi Ltd. Sold in 1956 to International Union Lines, Monrovia and renamed Union Metropole. Operated under the management of China Union Lines, Kaohsiung. Sold to her managers in 1961. Scrapped in Kaohsiung in 1967.

=== Fort Nashwaak ===
Fort Nashwaak was built by Burrard Dry Dock Co. Ltd. She was completed on 6 February 1943. Built for the MoWT, she was placed under the management of Dodd, Thomson & Co. To USMC in 1947. Laid up in reserve. Sold in 1948 to Compania Uruguayana Comercia y Maritima, Montevideo and renamed General Artigas. Operated under the management of Aristotle Onassis. Sold in 1950 to Oceanic Transport Corp., Monrovia. Lost her rudder in a typhoon off Goa on 5 July 1960 and was towed in to Bombay by the tug Elbe. Scrapped at Kaohsiung in 1968.

=== Fort Niagara ===
Fort Niagara was built by United Shipyards Ltd. She was completed as La Salle Park on 21 April 1944. Built for Park Steamship Co., Montreal, she was placed under the management of Cunard White Star Ltd. Sold in 1946 to Triton Steamship Co., Montreal and renamed Triland. Reflagged to the United Kingdom in 1951. Ran out of fuel in the Atlantic Ocean 400 nautical miles (740 km) off Halifax in March 1954. Taken in tow by the tug Foundation Frances. Sold in 1957 to Bahia Salinas Compania Navigation, Monrovia and renamed Manhattan. Operated under the management of Goulandris Bros. Ltd. Sold in 1964 to Federal Navigation Co., Monrovia and renamed Eastern Skipper. Operated under the management of First Steamship Co. Ltd. Scrapped at Kaohsiung in 1968.

=== Fort Nipigon ===
Fort Nipigon was built by Canadian Vickers Ltd. She was completed on 8 April 1942. Built for the MoWT, she was placed under the management of Booth Steamship Co. To USMC in 1947. Scrapped at Jersey City, New Jersey, United States in 1958.

=== Fort Nisqually ===
See Fort Carlton (I).

=== Fort Norfolk ===
Fort Norfolk was built by United Shipyards Ltd. She was completed on 19 July 1943. Built for the MoWT, she was placed under the management of Sir W. Reardon Smith Ltd. Struck a mine and sank in the English Channel off Juno Beach, France on 24 June 1944.

=== Fort Norman ===
Fort Norman was built by West Coast Shipbuilders Ltd. She was completed on 22 September 1942. Built for the MoWT, she was placed under the management of W. H. Cockerline & Co. Torpedoed and damaged in the Mediterranean Sea (36°51′N 1°09′E) on 9 March 1943. To USMC in 1948, then sold later that year to Muhammadi Steamship Co., Karachi and renamed Al Murtaza Ali. Sold in 1954 to United Oriental Steamship Co., Karachi and renamed Anwarbaksh. During the Indo-Pakistani War of 1971, she was captured by the Indian Navy in the Bay of Bengal on 9 December and taken in to Calcutta. Sold in 1975 to Bangladesh Shipping Corp., Chittagong, Bangladesh and renamed Banglar Mukti. Scrapped at Chittagong in 1981.

=== Fort Norway ===
Fort Norway was built by Burrard Dry Dock Co. Ltd. She was completed as Mohawk Park on 24 June 1944. Built for Park Steamship Co., Montreal. To MoWT in 1944 and renamed Fort Spokane. Operated under the management of Watts, Watts & Co. To MoWT in 1946, management transferred to Cunard White Star Line. Sold in 1951 to Buries, Markes Ltd., London and renamed La Orilla. Sold in 1952 to Fratelli d'Amico, Rome and renamed Ariella. Scrapped at Trieste in 1965.

=== Fort Nottingham ===
Fort Nottingham was built by Marine Industries Ltd. She was completed on 12 July 1944. Built for the MoWT, she was placed under the management of Capper, Alexander & Co. To MoT in 1946. Operated under the management of C. Strubin & Co. Management transferred to R. S. Dalgleish in 1950. Sold later that year to Nova Scotia Marine Enterprise Co., London and renamed Alendi Hill. Operated under the management of Nordic Ship Management Co. Management later transferred to Counties Ship Management Co. Rescued a French Foreign Legion deserter from a raft in March 1953. Sold in 1960 to Wallem & Co., Hong Kong and renamed Ho Fung. Sold in 1964 to Yick Fung Shipping & Enterprises Co., Hong Kong. Scrapped at Shanghai in 1974.

== Fort O ==
=== Fort Orleans ===
Fort Orleans was built by Burrard Dry Dock Co. Ltd. She was completed on 19 November 1943. Built for the MoWT, she was placed under the management of J. Morrison & Son. Sold in 1946 to Montship Lines Ltd., Montreal and renamed Mont Sorrel. Operated under the management of Montreal Shipping Co. Ltd. Sold in 1948 to Dutch Government and renamed Laagkerk. Operated under the management of Oranje Lijn. Management transferred to N.V. Vereenigde Nederlandsche Stoomboot-Maatschappij in 1949. Sold to her managers in 1952. Scrapped at Hong Kong in 1959.

== Fort P ==
=== Panmure ===
Fort Panmure was built by North Vancouver Ship Repairs Ltd. She was completed on 7 October 1943. Built for the MoWT, she was placed under the management of A. Weir & Co. Sold in 1946 to Park Steamship Co., Montreal. Sold in 1947 to Saguenay Terminals Ltd., Montreal. Operated under the management of Aluminium Company of Canada Ltd. Renamed Sunvalley in 1948. Reflagged to United Kingdom in 1955. Sold in 1969 to Eddy Steamship Co., Keelung and renamed Kally Scrapped at Kaohsiung in 1966.

=== Fort Paskoyak ===
Fort Paskoyak was built by North Vancouver Ship Repairs Ltd. She was completed on 14 October 1942. Built for the MoWT, she was placed under the management of J. Chambers & Co. Torpedoed and damaged in the Atlantic Ocean (36°27′N 10°17′W) on 6 March 1943. New engine fitted in September 1943. To USMC in 1947. Sold in 1948 to Iran Navigation Co., Bushire, Iran and renamed Iran. Sold in 1953 to Royal Steamship Co., Panama and renamed Hassan. Sold in 1954 to Compania de Navigation Phoenix, Panama and renamed Tiha. Operated under the management of Ivanovic & Co. Sold in 1960 to The Saint Line, London and renamed Saint Dunstan. Sold in 1962 to B. T. Shipping Co., Hong Kong and renamed Bename. Scrapped at Kaohsiung in 1967.

=== Fort Pelly ===
Fort Pelly was built by Yarrows Ltd. She was completed on 26 August 1942. Built for the MoWT, she was placed under the management of Sir R, Ropner & Co. Bombed and sunk off Augusta, Sicily, Italy on 20 July 1943.

=== Fort Pembina ===
Fort Pembina was built by Burrard Dry Dock Co. Ltd. She was completed on 5 August 1942. Built for the MoWT, she was placed under the management of J. A. Billmeir & Co. To USMC in 1947. Laid up in reserve. Scrapped at Baltimore in 1958.

=== Fort Perrot ===
Fort Perrot was built by Prince Rupert Drydock & Shipyard. She was completed on 25 February 1944. Built for the MoWT, she was placed under the management of Headlam & Son. Torpedoed and damaged in the North Sea (50°50′N 0°44′E by Kriegsmarine E-boats on 27 July 1944. Sold in 1946 to Montship Lines, Montreal. Sold in 1947 to Andros Shipping Ltd, Montreal and renamed Rockside. Operated under the management of Capeside Steamship Co. Ltd. Sold in 1952 to Imperso Compania Navigation, Puerto Limon and renamed Dorion. Operated under the management of Adamanthos Ship Operating Co. Inc. Reflagged to Liberia in 1956. Reflagged to Greece in 1959 and renamed Appolonia. Sold inn 1960 to Tricontinental Transport Corp., Panama and renamed Antonios S. Scrapped at Tsuneishi in 1969.

=== Fort Pic ===
Fort Pic was built by Marine Industries Ltd. She was completed on 7 November 1943. Built for the MoWT, she was placed under the management of J. & C. Harrison. Sold in 1948 to Acadia Overseas Freighters Ltd., Halifax and renamed Haligonian Baron. Operated under the management of I. H. Mather & Son. Renamed Wembley Hill in 1950 and placed under the management of Counties Ship Management Co. Sold in 1957 to Transcontinental Oil Transportation Corp., Monrovia and renamed Cassoipea. Operated under the management of Rethymnis & Kulukundis Ltd. Sold in 1960 to Transoceanic Finance & Trading Corp., Piraeus. Sold in 1961 to Oceania Industrial Corp., Hong Kong and renamed Shaukiwan. Operated under the management of Wallem & Co. Sold in 1965 to Keh Sok Sa, Monrovia and renamed Asia Enterprises. Scrapped at Yokosuka in 1967.

=== Fort Pine ===
Fort Pine was built by Burrard Dry Dock Co. Ltd. She was completed on 18 July 1942. Built for the MoWT, she was placed under the management of Hall Bros. To USMC in 1947. Laid up in reserve. Scrapped at Philadelphia, Pennsylvania, United States in 1970.

=== Fort Pitt ===
Fort Pitt was built by Burrard Dry Dock Co. Ltd. She was completed on 27 July 1942. Built for the MoWT, she was placed under the management of H. Hogarth & Sons. To USMC in 1948. Laid up in reserve. Scrapped at Mobile in 1959.

=== Fort Poplar ===
Fort Poplar was built by Burrard Dry Dock Co. Ltd. She was completed on 31 October 1942. Built for the MoWT, she was placed under the management of F. C. Strick & Co. To USMC in 1947. Sold in 1948 to L'Italica di Navigazione S.A., Genoa and renamed Etrusco. Operated under the management of Ditta Marino Querci. Ran aground near Scituate, Massachusetts, United States on 16 March 1956. Refloated seven months later, but declared a constructive total loss. Sold in 1957 to Victor Transport Corp., Monrovia and renamed Scituate. Operated under the management of Western Production Co. Sold in 1960 to Blessing Sociètè Anonyme, Beirut and renamed Irene X. Ran aground and was severely damaged in the Gulf of Tonkin (20°37′N 107°12′E) on 8 April 1964. Refloated on 11 April. Towed in to Hong Kong on 10 May. Driven ashore in a typhoon at Hong Kong on 9 August. Consequently, sold for scrap in October 1964.

=== Fort Providence ===
Fort Providence was a Victory ship built by Burrard Dry Dock Co. Ltd. She was completed on 8 July 1944. Built for the MoWT, she was placed under the management of Ellerman & Bucknall Steamship Co. Sold in 1948 to Eastboard Navigation Co., Montreal and renamed Eastwater. Sold in 1951 to Federal Commerce & Navigation Co., London. Operated under the management of Toronto. Sold in 1952 to Andros Shipping Co., Montreal and renamed Duneside. Operated under the management of Capeside Steamship Co. Ltd. Management later transferred to Goulandris Bros. Sold in 1953 to Franco Maresco fu Mariano, Genoa and renamed Mar Libero. Sold in 1959 to Jugoslavenska Tankerska Plovidba, Zadar, Yugoslavia and renamed Dugi Otok. Scrapped at Onomichi in 1967.

=== Fort Prudhomme ===
Fort Prudhomme was built by Burrard Dry Dock Co. Ltd. She was completed on 8 October 1943. Built for the MoWT, she was placed under the management of Charlton, McAllum & Co. Sold in 1946 to Acadia Overseas Freighters Ltd., Montreal and renamed Cumberland County. Operated under the management of I. H. Mather & Son. Management later transferred to Counties Ship Management Co. Ltd. Sold in 1950 to Compania Maritima Astromar S.A., Monrovia and renamed Corsair. Sold in 1954 to Livadia Compania Navigation, Monrovia and renamed Nicolaos. Scrapped at Osaka in 1959.

== Fort Q ==
=== Fort Qu'apelle ===
Fort Qu'apelle was built by Burrard Dry Dock Co. Ltd. She was completed on 21 March 1942. Built for the MoWT, she was placed under the management of W. Thomson & Son. Torpedoed and sunk in the Atlantic Ocean (59°50′N 63°30′W) by U-135 on 17 May 1942.

== Fort R ==
=== Fort Rae ===
Fort Rae was built by Burrard Dry Dock Co. Ltd. She was completed on 8 September 1942. Built for the MoWT, she was placed under the management of Glen & Co. To USMC in 1947. Sold in 1948 to Titi Campanella Società di Navigazione, Genoa and renamed Pietro Campanella. Renamed Clelia Campanella later that year. Sold in 1960 to "Siamar" Società Italiana Attivita Marittia, Genoa and renamed Monte Santo Scrapped at La Spezia in 1964.

=== Fort Rampart ===
Fort Rampart was built by West Coast Shipbuilders Ltd. She was completed on 23 January 1943. Built for the MoWT, she was placed under the management of Charlton, McAllum & Co. Torpedoed and sunk in the Atlantic Ocean (47°22′N 21°58′W) by U-226, or by aircraft, on 17 April 1943.

=== Fort Reliance ===
Fort Reliance was built by Burrard Dry Dock Co. Ltd. She was completed on 28 September 1942. Built for the MoWT, she was placed under the management of Allan, Black & Co. To USMC in 1947. Laid up in reserve. Scrapped at Philadelphia in 1959.

=== Fort Remy ===
Fort Remy was built by United Shipyards Ltd. She was completed on 15 February 1943. Built for the MoWT, she was placed under the management of Evan Thomas, Radcliffe & Co. To USMC in 1948. Laid up in reserve. Scrapped at Baltimore in 1959.

=== Fort Richelieu ===
Fort Richelieu was built by Marine Industries Ltd. She was completed on 14 October 1943. Built for the MoWT, she was placed under the management of Evan Thomas, Radcliffe & Co. To MoT in 1946. Operated under the management of Dalhousie Steam & Motor Ship Co. Sold in 1950 to Halifax Overseas Freighters Ltd., London and renamed Beech Hill. Operated under the management of I. H. Mathers & Son. Management later transferred to Counties Ship Management Co. Ltd. Sold in 1964 to Marvaliente Compania Navigation, Piraeus and renamed Alkon. Sold in 1966 to Alkon Shipping Co., Famagusta. Scrapped in China in 1967.

=== Fort Romaine ===
Fort Romaine was built by United Shipyards Ltd. She was completed on 8 September 1943. Built for the MoWT, she was placed under the management of Hall Bros. Sold in 1948 to P. & T. Steamship Co., Montreal and renamed L'Alouette. Operated under the management of Papachristidis Co. Ltd. Renamed Montrealer in 1950. Sold in 1953 to Worldwide Steamship Co., Monrovia and renamed Everest. Operated under the management of Steamship Navigation Co. "George Portaminos" Ltd. Reflagged to Greece in 1964. Scrapped at Castellón de la Plana, Spain in 1968.

=== Fort Rosalie ===
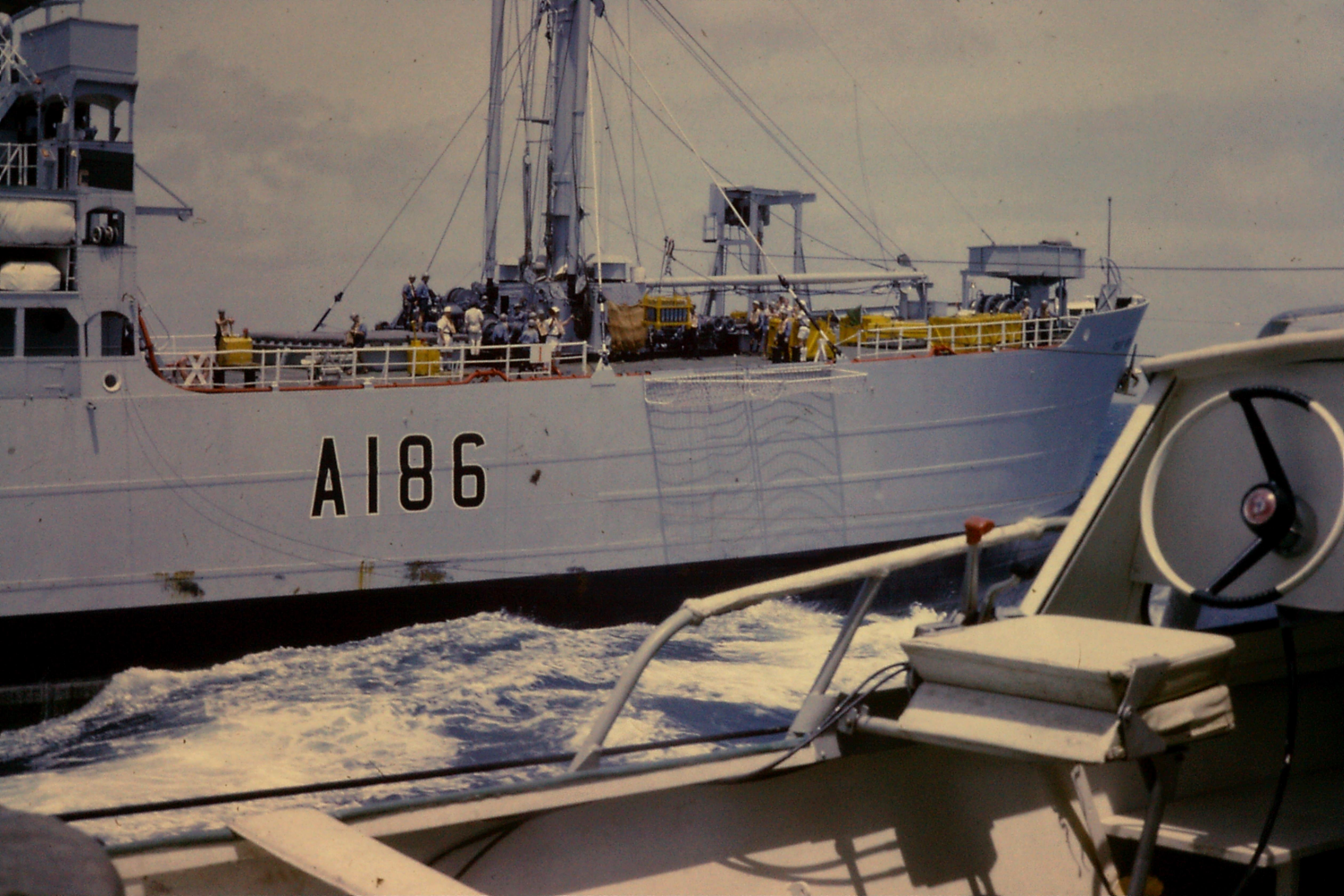
RFA Fort Rosalie

Fort Rosalie was built by United Shipyards Ltd. Launched on 18 November 1944, she was completed on 7 July 1945. Built for the MoWT, she was placed under the management of Ellerman Lines Ltd. To Admiralty in 1947, converted to a Stores Issuing Ship. Operated by the Royal Fleet Auxiliary. Withdrawn from service 1 May 1972. Scrapped by Varela Davalillo at Castellón de la Plana in March 1973.

=== Fort Rouge ===
See Fort Miami (III).

=== Fort Rouille ===
Fort Rouille was built by United Shipyards Ltd. She was completed on 30 July 1943. Built for the MoWT, she was placed under the management of Mitchell, Cotts & Co. To MoT in 1946. Operated under the management of Sun Shipping Co. Sold in 1948 to Ivor Shipping Co., Montreal and renamed Ivor Rita. Operated under the management of Quebec Steamship Lines. Reflagged to the United Kingdom in 1951. Sold in 1956 to Novor Shipping Co, London and renamed Novor Rita. Operated under the management of Chandris Ltd. Sold in 1958 to Maristrella Navegacion S.A., Piraeus and renamed Rita, remaining under the management of Chandris. Ran aground in the Indian Ocean off Goa, India (15°21′N 73°47′E) and broke in two on 1 July 1960.

=== Fort Rupert ===
Fort Rupert was built by Prince Rupert Drydock & Shipyard. She was completed on 5 October 1942. Built for the MoWT, she was placed under the management of Evan Thomas, Radcliffe & Co. To USMC in 1947. Laid up in Reserve. Scrapped in Baltimore in 1958.

== Fort S ==
=== Fort Sakisdac ===
Fort Sakisdac was built by Burrard Dry Dock Co. Ltd. She was completed on 19 October 1943. Built for the MoWT, she was placed under the management of Hain Steamship Co. Sold in 1946 to Canadian Shipowners Co., Montreal and renamed Marchcape. Operated under the management of March Shipping Agency Ltd. Sold in 1949 to Compania de Navigation Panamena Ultramarina, Panama and renamed Margo. Sold in 1959 to Toula Navegacion Ltda, Panama and renamed Toula N. Reflagged to the Lebanon in 1961. Scrapped at Hong Kong in 1963.

=== Fort Saleesh ===
Fort Saleesh was built by North Vancouver Ship Repairs Ltd. She was completed on 13 November 1943. Built for the MoWT, she was placed under the management of Evan Thomas, Radcliffe & Co. Sold in 1946 to Argonaut Navigation Co., Montreal and renamed Argomont. Operated under the management of J. Constantine, or John C. Yelemos then A. Lusi Ltd. Sold in 1949 to Compania de Navigation Zita, Panama and renamed Corfu Island. Operated under the management of A. Lusi Ltd. Ran aground in the Magdalen Islands, Canada (47°23′N 61°54′W) on 20 December 1963 and was wrecked.

=== Fort Sandusky (I) ===
Fort Sandusky was built by North Vancouver Ship Repairs Ltd. She was completed as Kitsilano Park on 31 December 1943. Built for Park Steamship Co., Montreal, she was placed under the management of Empire Shipping Co. Sold in 1946 to Western Canada Steamships Co., Vancouver and renamed Lake Kootenay. Sold in 1949 to Compania Maritima Samsoc, Panama and renamed Phopho. Sold in 1950 to Gypsum Carrier Inc., Panama and renamed Harry Lundeberg. Wrecked off Cape San Lucas, Mexico (22°52′N 109°53′W) on 8 February 1954. Declared a constructive total loss.

=== Fort Sandusky (II) ===
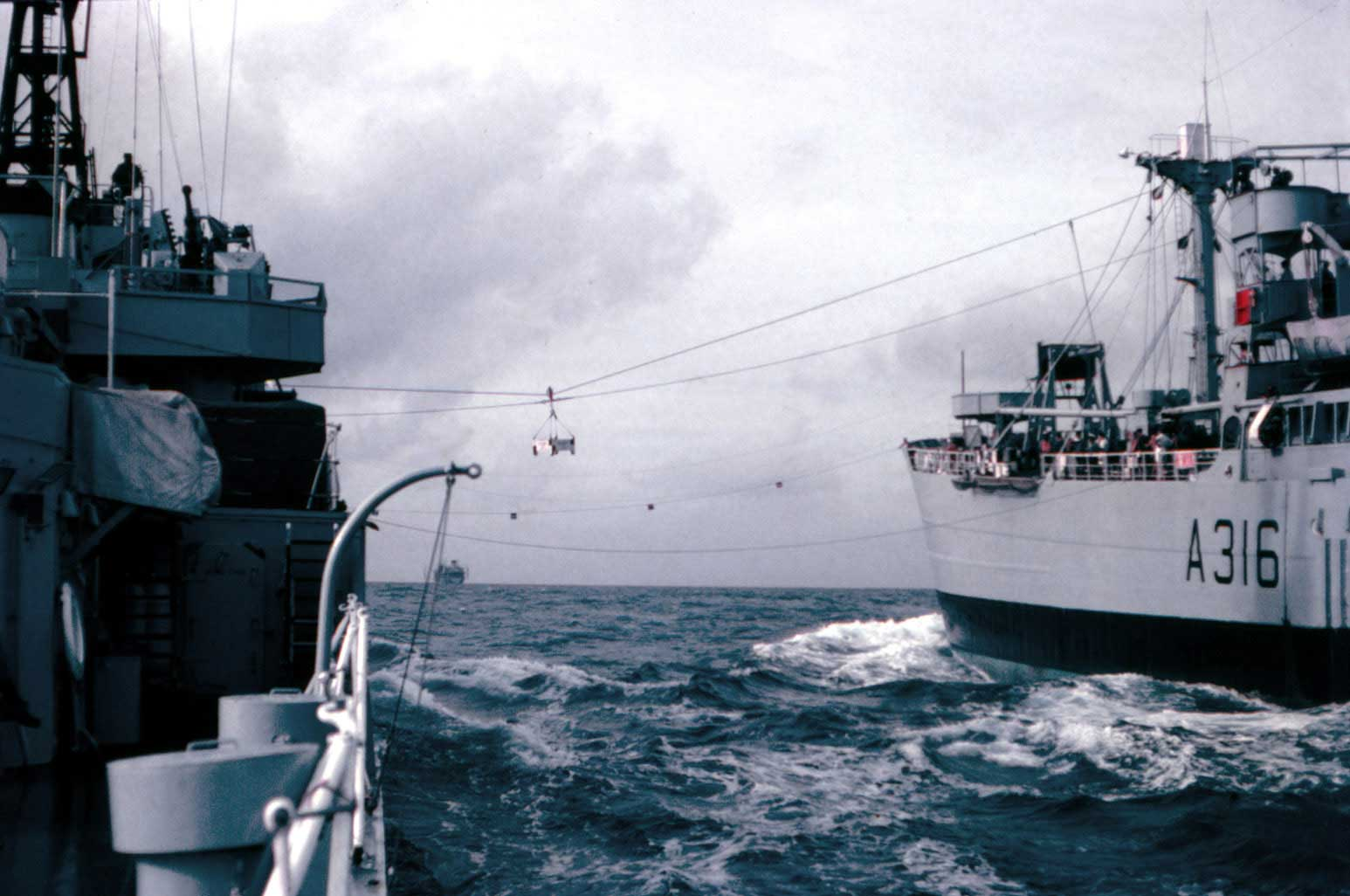
RFA Fort Sandusky

Fort Sandusky was built by United Shipyards Ltd. Launched on 25 November 1944, she was completed on 1 August 1945. Built for the MoWT, she was placed under the management of Ellerman Lines Ltd. Management transferred to W. H. Seager & Co Ltd. in 1948. To Admiralty in 1949, converted to a Stores Issuing Ship. Operated by the Royal Fleet Auxiliary. Withdrawn from service in 1972. Arrived at Castellón de la Plana on 10 February 1973 for scrapping by Varela Davalillo.

=== Fort Senneville ===
Fort Senneville was built by Canadian Vickers Ltd. She was completed on 3 August 1942. Built for the MoWT, she was placed under the management of J. A. Billmeir & Co. To USMC in 1947. Laid up in reserve. Sold in 1949 to Bharat Line Ltd., Bombay and renamed Bharatrani. Scrapped at Bombay in 1963.

=== Fort Simcoe (I) ===
Fort Simcoe was built by Burrard Dry Dock Co. Ltd. She was completed as Green Hill Park on 25 January 1944. Built for Park Steamship Co., Montreal, she was placed under the management of Canada Shipping Co. Caught fire at Vancouver on 6 March 1945 and was beached. Refloated on 12 March, declared a constructive total loss. Sold in 1946 to Polar Compania de Navigation, Panama and renamed Phaeax II. Operated under the management of Union Maritime ^ Shipping Co. Sold in 1956 to Compania Armadora San Francisco, Panama and renamed Lagos Michigan. Operated under the management of Salvatores & Racah SRL. Collided with the British cargo ship Helenus at the north entrance of the Suez Canal on 12 November 1959. Scrapped at Kaohsiung in 1968.

=== Fort Simcoe (II) ===
Fort Simcoe was built by Prince Rupert Drydock & Shipyard. She was completed as Elgin Park on 23 February 1945. Built for Park Steamship Co., Montreal, she was placed under the management of Seaboard Shipping Co. Sold in 1946 to Furness Withy (Canada) Ltd., Montreal and renamed Royal Prince. Sold in 1949 to Navegacion Maritima Panama, Panama and renamed Atlantic Star. Operated under the management of S. Livanos & Co. Inc. Sold in 1953 to Atlantic Freighters Ltd., Panama. Sold in 1961 to Faik Zeren, Istanbul and renamed Nadir. Scrapped at Istanbul in 1972.

=== Fort Simpson ===
Fort Simpson was built by North Vancouver Ship Repairs Ltd. She was completed on 11 September 1942. Built for the MoWT, she was placed under the management of Chellew Navigation Co. To USMC in 1947. Sold in 1948 to "Italia" Società per Azioni di Navigazione, Genoa and renamed Atalanta II. Renamed Atalanta in 1949. Sold in 1951 to Marittima Capodorso S.p.A., Rome. Scrapped at Vado Ligure in 1966.

=== Fort Slave ===
Fort Slave was built by West Coast Shipbuilders Ltd. She was completed on 10 October 1942. Built for the MoWT, she was placed under the management of McCowen & Gross Ltd. To USMC in 1948. Laid up in reserve. Scrapped at Mobile in 1960.

=== Fort Souris ===
Fort Souris was built by West Coast Shipbuilders Ltd. She was completed on 27 October 1942. Built for the MoWT, she was placed under the management of B. J. Sutherland & Co. To USMC in 1948. Laid up in reserve. Scrapped at Beaumont in 1959.

=== Fort Spokane ===
See Fort Norway.

=== Fort Stager ===
Fort Stager was built by West Coast Shipbuilders Ltd. She was completed on 17 February 1943. Built for the MoWT, she was placed under the management of Sir R. Ropner & Co. To USMC in 1948. Laid up in reserve. Scrapped at Baltimore in 1958.

=== Fort St. Antoine ===
Fort St. Antoine was built by North Vancouver Ship Repairs Ltd. She was completed on 17 December 1943. Built for the MoWT, she was placed under the management of H. Hogarth & Sons. Sold in 1946 to Park Steamship Co., Montreal. Sold in 1947 to Kerr-Silver Lines (Canada) Ltd., Vancouver and renamed Manx Fisher. collided with American tanker Sparrows Point off San Francisco in 1949. Sold in 1949 to Muhammadi Steamships Lines, Karachir and renamed Al Hasan. Collided with another vessel and ran aground in a cyclong at Chittagong, East Pakistan in May 1963. Scrapped at Karachi in 1964.

=== Fort St. Croix ===
Fort St. Croix was built by Burrard Dry Dock Co. Ltd. She was completed on 8 December 1943. Built for the MoWT, she was placed under the management of United Baltic Corp. Ltd. Sold in 1946 to Park Steamship Co., Montreal. Sold later that year to Argonaut Navigation Co., Montreal and renamed Argovic. Operated under the management of Constantine Line Ltd. Sold in 1949 to Compania Navigation Coronado SA., Panama and renamed Vassilis. Operated under the management of A. Lusi Ltd. Reflagged to Greece in 1959 and renamed Yiosonas. Scrapped at Shōdoshima in 1967.

=== Fort Steele ===
Fort Steele was built by North Vancouver Ship Repairs Ltd. She was completed on 16 November 1942. Built for the MoWT, she was placed under the management of Lyle Shipping Co. To USMC in 1948. Laid up in reserve. Scrapped at Beaumont in 1959.

=== Fort St. François ===
Fort St. François was built by Davie Shipbuilding & Repairing Co. Ltd. She was completed on 14 December 1942. Built for the MoWT, she was placed under the management of Counties Ship Management Co. To USMC in 1948. Laid up in reserve. Scrapped at Panama City, Florida in 1961.

=== Fort St. Ignace (I) ===
Fort St. Ignace was built by West Coast Shipbuilders Ltd. She was completed as Tecumseh Park on 23 October 1943. Built for Park Steamship Co., Montreal, she was placed under the management of Canadian Transport Co. Ltd. In distress and reported to be breaking up in the Atlantic Ocean 840 nautical miles (1,560 km) east of Halifax on 14 January 1947. A coastguard cutter and two tugs were sent to her rescue. USAT General M. L. Hersey stood by for two days before she managed to get under way. Sold in 1947 to Argonaut Navigation Co., Montreal and renamed Argovan. Reflagged to the United Kingdom in 1954. Sold in 1959 to Strovili Compania Navigation, Piraeus and renamed Cardamilitis. Scrapped at Shanghai in 1967.

=== Fort St. Ignace (II) ===
Fort St. Ignace was built by Victoria Machinery Depot Co. Ltd. She was completed as Hastings Park on 17 August 1944. Built for Park Steamship Co., Montreal, she was placed under the management of Empire Shipping Ltd. Sold in 1946 to Western Canada Steamships Co., Vancouver and renamed Kamloops Lake. Sold in 1950 to Navarra Compania Navigation, Panama and renamed Lavadara. Sold in 1952 to Muhammadi Steamships Co., Karachi and renamed Al Sayyada. Scrapped in Karachi in 1967.

=== Fort Stikine ===
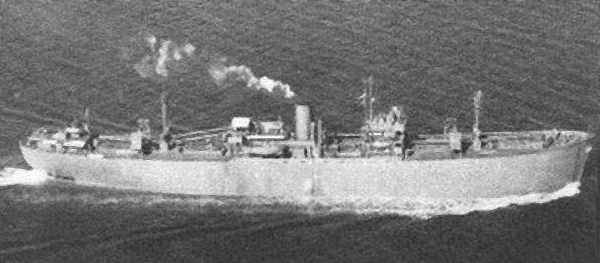
Fort Stikine

Fort Stikine was built by Prince Rupert Drydock & Shipyard. She was completed on 31 July 1942. Built for the MoWT, she was placed under the management of Port Line Ltd. Caught fire, exploded and was obliterated at Bombay on 14 October 1944. Twelve other ships lost.

=== Fort St. James ===
Fort St. James was built by Burrard Dry Dock Co. Ltd. Launched on 15 October 1941, she was completed on 29 January 1942. Built for the MoWT, she was placed under the management of Ellerman's Wilson Line. Sold in 1946 to Temple Steamship Co., London and renamed Temple Bar Operated under the management of Lambert Bros. Sold in 1959 to Wallem & Co., Hong Kong and renamed Nord Sky. Sold later that year to China and renamed Hoping 27. Renamed Zhan Dou 27 in 1967. Deleted from Lloyd's Register in 1992.

=== Fort St. Joseph ===
Fort St. Joseph was built by Marine Industries Ltd. She was completed on 23 October 1943. Built for the MoWT, she was placed under the management of Capper, Alexander & Co. To MoT in 1946. Operated under the management of United Africa Co. Sold in 1950 to Black Lion Steamship Co., London and renamed Mavis Hill. Operated under the management of H. Mather & Sons. Ran aground off Cape Guardafui, British Somaliland on 26 June 1952. Refloated on 29 November and towed in to Suez, Egypt, where she arrived on 10 February 1953. Scrapped at Savona, Italy in September 1953.

=== Fort St. Nicolas ===
Fort St. Nicolas was built by Burrard Dry Dock Co. Ltd. She was completed on 28 September 1943. Built for the MoWT, she was placed under the management of J. Cory & Sons. Torpedoed and sunk in the Mediterranean Sea (40°34′N 14°37′E by U-410 on 15 February 1944.

=== Fort St. Paul ===
Fort St. Paul was built by Marine Industries Ltd. She was completed on 25 December 1942. Built for the MoWT, she was placed under the management of Maclay & Macintyre Ltd. To MoT in 1946. Operated under the management of Houlder Bros & Co. Sold in 1951 to Champlain Freighters Ltd., London and renamed Tarsian. Operated under the management of J. P. Hadoulis Ltd. Sold in 1956 to Marolas S.A., Monrovia and renamed Marika, remaining under the management of Hadoulis. Sold in 1958 to Peninsular Shipping Co., Hong Kong and renamed Longford. Sold later that year to China and renamed Hoping 50. Renamed Zhan Dou 50 in 1967. Deleted from Lloyd's Register in 1992.

=== Fort St. Regis ===
Fort St. Regis was built by Marine Industries Ltd. She was completed on 7 June 1943. Built for the MoWT, she was placed under the management of Dodd, Thompson & Co. To MoT in 1946. Operated under the management of South American Saint Line Ltd. Sold in 1948 to Vancouver Oriental Line Ltd., Vancouver and renamed Yale County. Operated under the management of I. H. Mathers & Son. Renamed Sudbury Hill in 1950 and placed under the management of Counties Ship Management Co. Ran aground off Bermuda on 15 January 1955. Refloated with the assistance of tugs. Sold in 1964 to Tower Steamship Co. (Bermuda) Ltd, remaining under the same manager. Her crew mutinied over a pay dispute in January 1966. Order was restored with assistance from HMS Dido. Scrapped at Kaohsiung in 1967.

=== Fort Sturgeon ===
Fort Sturgeon was built by Victoria Machinery Depot. She was completed on 23 May 1943. Built for the MoWT, she was placed under the management of W. Runciman & Co. To MoT in 1946. Operated under the management of Dalhousie Steam & Motor Ship Co. Management transferred to Thomas Dunlop & Sons in 1950. Sold later that year to Canadian Tramp Shipping Co., London and renamed East Hill. Operated under the management of Counties Ship Management Co. Sold in 1957 to Nestor Compania Navigation, Monrovia and renamed Rio Alto. Operated under the management of Somerset Shipbrokers Ltd. Management later transferred to D. C. & C. D. Georgopoulos. Sold in 1959 to Pacific Shipping Corp., Monrovia. Sold in 1965 to Viaguardia Compania Navigation, Monrovia and renamed Aktor. Sold in 1966 to Aktor Shipping Co., Famagusta. Sprang a leak and sank in the Pacific Ocean (19°21′N 124°13′E) on 1 June 1966.

== Fort T ==
=== Fort Tadoussac ===
Fort Tadoussac was built by Davie Shipbuilding & Repairing Co. Ltd. She was completed on 18 April 1942. Built for the MoWT, she was placed under the management of Ellerman & Bucknall Steamship Co. To USMC in 1947. Laid up in reserve. Scrapped at Mobile in 1959.

=== Fort Thompson ===
Fort Thompson was built by Burrard Dry Dock Co. Ltd. She was completed on 23 October 1942. Built for the MoWT, she was placed under the management of Glen & Co. Torpedoed and damaged in the Atlantic Ocean (48°55′N 68°41′W) on 2 November 1944. To USMC in 1948. Laid up in reserve. Scrapped at Beaumont in 1959.

=== Fort Ticonderoga ===
Fort Ticonderoga was built by United Shipyards Ltd. She was completed on 7 December 1943. Built for the MoWT, she was placed under the management of Chellew Navigation Co. Damaged by a mine in the eastern Mediterranean Sea on 10 January 1946 and put in to Trieste on 12 January. To MoT in 1946. Operated under the management of Cunard White Star Line. Sold in 1948 to Ivor Shipping Co., Montreal and renamed Ivor Isobel. Operated under the management of Quebec Steamship Lines Ltd. Reflagged to the United Kingdom in 1951. Collided with a Danish ship off Cardiff on 8 February 1954 and was holed. Sold in 1956 to Novor Shipping Co., London and renamed Novor Isobel. Operated under the management of Chandris Ltd. Sold in 1958 to Hereford Shipping Co. Ltd, London. Placed under the Hong Kong flag. Sold in 1959 to Chinese owners, renamed Hoping 51. Renamed Zhan Dou 51 in 1967. Reported scrapped in China in 1985.

=== Fort Toulouse ===
Fort Toulouse was built by Burrard Dry Dock Co. Ltd. She was completed as Sapperton Park on 7 January 1944. Built for Park Steamship Co., Montreal she was placed under the management of Canadian Transport Co., Vancouver. Sold to her managers in 1946 and renamed Harmac Alberni. Sold in 1948 to Furness (Canada) Ltd., Montreal and renamed Royston Grange. operated under the management of Furness, Withy & Co. Ltd Sold in 1949 to Rio Pardo Compania Navigation, Panama and renamed Yiannis. Operated under the management of Goulandris Bros. (Hellas) Ltd. Sold in 1954 to Compania Prospero S.A., Panama. Scrapped at Mihara in 1967.

=== Fort Tremblant ===
Fort Tremblant was built by Victoria Machinery Depot. She was completed on 11 December 1942. Built for the MoWT, she was placed under the management of W. H. Seager & Co. To USMC in 1947. Sold later that year to Tempus Shipping Co., London and renamed Beatus. Operated under the management of W. H. Seager & Co. Ltd. Sold in 1955 to Stanhope Steamship Co., London and renamed Stanland. Operated under the management of J. A. Billmeir & Co. Scrapped at Hong Kong in 1963.

=== Fort Turtle ===
Fort Turtle was built by Prince Rupert Drydock & Shipyard. She was completed on 21 May 1943. Built for the MoWT, she was placed under the management of Haldin & Philipps Ltd. To MoT in 1946. Operated under the management of William Brown, Atkinson & Co. Sold in 1950 to Ottawa Steamship Co., London and renamed Arundel Hill. Operated under the management of I. H. Mathers & Son. Management later transferred to Counties Ship Management Co. Management transferred to Coulouthros Ltd in 1952. Sold in 1957 to Andria Naviera S.A., Monrovia and renamed Cyprinia. Operated under the management of John A. Coulouthros. Sold in 1964 to Reliance Marine Corp., Monrovia and renamed Ever Health. Scrapped at Onomichi in 1969.

== Fort V ==
=== Fort Venango ===
Fort Venango was built by Burrard Dry Dock Co. Ltd. She was completed on 29 October 1943. Built for the MoWT, she was placed under the management of Capper, Alexander & Co. Sold in 1946 to Acadia Overseas Freighters Ltd., Montreal and renamed Colchester County. Operated under the management of I. H. Mathers & Son. Management later transferred to Counties Ship Management Co. Ltd. Sold in 1949 to Compania de Navigation San George, Panama and renamed Santa Calli. Operated under the management of Rethymnis & Kulukundis Ltd. Sold in 1952 to Marine Transport Co., Panama and renamed Calli, remaining under the management of Rethymnis & Kulukundis. Sold in 1956 to August Thyssen Hutte AG., Hamburg and renamed Auguste Thyssen. Operated under the management of Frigga Seeschiffahrt G.m.b.H., Hamburg. Sold to her managers in 1958. Scrapped in Hamurg in 1962.

=== Fort Verchères ===
Fort Verchères was built by United Shipyards Ltd. She was completed on 8 May 1943. Built for the MoWT, she was placed under the management of Hain Steamship Co. To MoT in 1946. Operated under the management of Dalhousie Steam & Motor Ship Co. Sold in 1950 to Halifax Overseas Freighters, London and renamed Maple Hill. Operated under the management of I. H. Mathers & Son. Management later transferred to Counties Ship Management Co.Ltd. Sold in 1965 to Counties Steam Navigation Co., London, remaining under the same management. Sold in 1966 to Diopside Steamship (Panama) Ltd., Panama and renamed Diopside. Renamed Entan in 1969. Scrapped at Hirao in 1970.

=== Fort Vermillion ===
Fort Vermillion was built by Burrard Dry Dock Co. Ltd. She was completed on 7 October 1942. Built for the MoWT, she was placed under the management of Counties Ship Management Co. To United States Maritime Commission in 1948. Laid up in reserve. Scrapped at Mobile in 1959.

=== Fort Ville Marie ===
Fort Ville Marie was built by Canadian Vickers Ltd. She was completed on 21 December 1941. Built for the MoWT, she was placed under the management of T. & J. Brocklebank Ltd., Liverpool. Sold to her managers in 1946 and renamed Makalla. Scrapped at Ghent, Belgium in 1963.

== Fort W ==
=== Fort Wallace ===
Fort Wallace was a Victory ship built by Burrard Dry Dock Co. Ltd. She was completed on 18 February 1944. Built for the MoWT, she was placed under the management of Lambert Bros. Sold in 1946 to Acadia Overseas Freighters Ltd., Halifax and renamed Vancouver County. Operated under the management of I. H. Mathers & Son. Sold in 1950 to Israel-America Line, Haifa and renamed Akko. Operated under the management of Shoham Sherutey Hayem Ltd. Sold in 1953 to Cargo Ships El-Yam Ltd., Haifa. Sold in 1954 to Athens Shipping Co., Puerto Limon and renamed Athens. Operated under the management of Faros Shipping Co. Reflagged to Greece in 1959. Sold to China in 1960 and renamed Hoping 76. Renamed Zhan Dou 76 in 1967. Ran aground in 1968 and scrapped.

=== Fort Walsh ===
Fort Walsh was built by Victoria Machinery Depot. She was completed on 31 January 1943. Built for the MoWT, she was placed under the management of Larrinaga Steamship Co. To USMC in 1947. Sold in 1948 to Navigazione "Alta Italia" S.A., Genoa and renamed Monstella. New steam turbine engine fitted in 1951. Sold in 1965 to Pistis Compania Navigation, Port-au-Prince and renamed Tihi. Scrapped at Hirao in 1967.

=== Fort Wayne ===
Fort Wayne was built by United Shipyards Ltd. She was completed on 1 September 1945. Built for the MoWT, she was placed under the management of Ellerman Lines Ltd. To MoT in 1948, converted to a Stores Issuing Ship. Sold in 1950 to Angusdale Ltd., Montreal and renamed Angusdale. Operated under the management of Lunham & Moore Shipping Ltd. Management later transferred to E. E. Dean & Co. Ltd. Renamed Cape Adan in 1954 and placed under the management of Lyle Shipping Co. Sold in 1956 to Bienvenido Steamship Co., Monrovia and renamed Andora. Operated under the management of John G. Livanos & Sons Ltd. Reflagged to Greece in 1959, scrapped at Savona later that year.

=== Fort Wedderburne ===
Fort Wedderburne was built by Burrard Dry Dock Co. Ltd. She was completed on 15 October 1942. Built for the MoWT, she was placed under the management of Lyle Shipping Co. To USMC in 1947. Sold in 1948 to Giuseppo Bozzo fu Lorenzo, Genoa and renamed Antonietta Bozzo. Scrapped at Vado Ligure in 1965.

=== Fort Wellington ===
Fort Wellington was built by United Shipyards Ltd. She was completed on 18 June 1943. Built for the MoWT, she was placed under the management of Sir R. Ropner & Co. Sold in 1949 to Acadia Overseas Freighters Ltd., Halifax and renamed Haligonian Queen. Operated under the management of I. H. Mathers & Son. Renamed Muswell Hill in 1950 and placed under the management of Counties Ship Management Co. Sold to Ocean Shipping Services Ltd., London, remaining under the same management. Scrapped at Kawajiri in 1967.

=== Fort Wrangell ===
Fort Wrangell was a Victory ship built by Burrard Dry Dock Co. Ltd. She was completed on 22 December 1944. Built for the MoWT, she was placed under the management of Eastern & Australian Steamship Co. Sold in 1948 to Eastboard Navigation Ltd., Montreal and renamed Eastwave. Sold in 1951 to Federal Commerce & Navigation Co., London, remaining under the Canadian flag. Sold in 1952 to Andros Shipping Co., London and renamed Lagoonside. Operated under the management of Goulandris Bros. Sold later that year to Compania Armadora San Francisco, Panama and renamed Lagos Ontario. Scrapped at Kaohsiung in 1968.

=== Fort Wrigley ===
Fort Wrigley was built by Victoria Machinery Depot. She was completed on 1 April 1943. Built for the MoWT, she was placed under the management of G. Nisbet & Co. To MoT in 1946. Operated under the management of Oakdene Shipping Co. Sold in 1948 to P. & T. Steamship Co., Montreal and renamed Pantrooper. Operated under the management of Papachristis Co. Renamed Royal William in 1950. Sold in 1954 to Asimarfield Shipping Corp., Monrovia. Sold in 1956 to L'Italia di Navigazione, Genoa and renamed Appulo. Operated under the management of Ditta Marinno Querci. Scrapped at Vardo Ligure in 1962.

== Fort Y ==
=== Fort Yale ===
Fort Yale was built by Burrard Dry Dock Co. Ltd. She was completed on 7 December 1942. Built for the MoWT, she was placed under the management of Charlton, McAllum & Co. Struck a mine and was damaged in the English Channel (49°25′N 0°27′W) on 8 August 1944. Taken in tow, but torpedoed and sunk (50°23′N 0°55′W) by U-480 on 23 August.

=== Fort Yukon ===
Fort Yukon was built by Burrard Dry Dock Co. Ltd. She was completed on 27 July 1943. Built for the MoWT, she was placed under the management of Capper, Alexander & Co. Sold in 1946 to Park Steamship Co., Montreal. Sold in 1947 to Vancouver Oriental Line Ltd., Montreal and renamed Nanaimo County. Operated under the management of Shoham Sherutey Hayam Ltd. Sold in 1949 to Israel-America Line, Haifa and renamed Haifa. Sold in 1954 to Comerciale Giuseppo Bozzo, Genoa and renamed Tarin. Scrapped at La Spezia in 1972.

== See also ==
- Empire ship
- Liberty ship
- Ocean ship
- Park ship
- Victory ship
