= SS Fort Abitibi =

History

United Kingdom
- Name: SS Fort Abitibi
- Owner: Ministry of War Transport
- Operator: Smith Hogg & Co., West Hartlepool
- Builder: Canadian Vickers Ltd., Montreal
- Completed: May 1942
- Fate: Broken up 1958

General characteristics
- Class & type: North Sands-type Fort ship
- Tonnage: 7,125 GRT
- Length: 440 ft 6 in (134.26 m)
- Beam: 57 ft 2 in (17.42 m)
- Draught: 26 ft 11.5 in (8.217 m)
- Propulsion: 3 cyl triple expansion steam; 2500 ihp; One shaft.
- Speed: 11 knots (13 mph; 20 km/h)
- Range: 11,400 nmi (21,100 km) at 10 kn (12 mph; 19 km/h)
- Complement: 115
- Armament: During the Second World War: 1 × 4-inch (100 mm) gun; 8 × 20mm AA guns

SS Fort Abitibi was a North Sands-type Fort ship of 7,125 GRT measuring 440.5 feet (134.3 m) long with a beam of 57.2 feet (17.4 m).

Fort and Park ships were the Canadian equivalent of the American Liberty ships. All three shared a similar design by J.L. Thompson and Sons of Sunderland, England. Fort ships had a triple expansion steam engine and a single screw propeller.

Fort Abitibi was built by Canadian Vickers Ltd., of Montreal. It was given Registry No.168825, and was delivered in May 1942 to the U.S. War Shipping Administration. The vessel was operated by Smith Hogg & Co., West Hartlepool, and was part of the merchant navy fleet supplying Britain during World War II. It was used by the U.S. Maritime Commission; in 1947 and was later transferred to Sir R Ropner & Co. Ltd., of West Hartlepool for the Ministry of War Transport. Fort Abitibi was broken up in Baltimore, Maryland, in 1958.

It sailed to Australia on several occasions.
