= SS Fort McMurray =

WW2 Cargo Ship

History
- Name: Fort McMurray
- Namesake: Fort McMurray
- Owner: Ministry of War Transport (1942–1947); United States War Shipping Administration (1947); Italia – Società di Navigazione (1948–1951); Achille Lauro (1951–1967)
- Builder: Burrard Dry Dock, North Vancouver
- Cost: $1,856,500 (CAD)
- Yard number: 164
- Launched: 27 August 1942
- Fate: Broken up in 1967, La Spezia, Italy

General characteristics
- Class & type: North Sands–type Fort ship
- Tonnage: 7,133 GRT (1942–1948); 6,968 GRT (1948–1967)
- Length: 129.39 m (424 ft 6 in)
- Beam: 17.37 m (57 ft 0 in)
- Height: 10.64 m (34 ft 11 in)
- Propulsion: 1 × 3-cylinder 2,500 ihp (1,900 kW) Dominion steam reciprocating engine
- Speed: 11 knots (20 km/h; 13 mph)
- Armament: 1 × 4 in (100 mm) gun; 8 × 20 mm (0.79 in) Oerlikon cannons anti-aircraft gun mounts

SS Fort McMurray was a North Sands–type Fort ship, a type of cargo ship. She took her name from the town of Fort McMurray in Alberta, following the same naming scheme as the other Fort ships. She was built as yard number 164 at the Burrard Dry Docks in North Vancouver and was successfully delivered in 1942.

== Service history ==
=== World War II ===
Fort McMurray initially served under the Ministry of War Transport, along with the other Fort ships, where she was operated and managed by Morel Ltd. of Cardiff. She joined several convoys transporting cargo across the Atlantic Ocean to the United Kingdom and the Mediterranean, with stops at Glasgow, Alexandria, and Bizerte.

=== Postwar ===
Fort McMurray was transferred to the United States Maritime Commission in 1947, where she served for a year, ferrying cargo and personnel across the Atlantic numerous times. Post-1948, she was removed from military service, renamed Pegaso, and sold to the Italian Line. The Italian Line operated her for only three years before she was sold to Napolitano entrepreneur Achille Lauro in 1951. For the next 17 years, she served as a merchant cargo ship throughout the Mediterranean. The ship was recorded as being only 6,968 GRT at this time, compared to her earlier 7,133 GRT measurement. This was likely due to owner modifications and the removal of her armament after being sold to Italian Line. She was broken up in La Spezia during 1967, following a 25-year career.
