= List of Park ships =

This is a list of Park ships

== Description ==
The majority of the Park ships were 10,000 DWT cargo ships or tankers. With one exception, the rest comprised off 4,700 DWT cargo ships or 3,600 DWT tankers. All were built in the Dominion of Canada.

== A— Park ==
=== Ainslie Park ===
Ainslie Park was built by Foundation Maritime Ltd., Pictou, Nova Scotia, Dominion of Canada. She was completed on 13 December 1943. Built for Ministry of War Transport (MoWT). Sold in 1946 to Centre d'Approvisionment de l'Indochine, Marseille, France and renamed Henri Mouhot. Operated under the management of Chargeurs Réunis. Renamed Tran Ninh in 1950. Sold in 1953 to Denis Frères d'Indochine, Saigon, French Indo-China. Sold in 1955 to Transportes Maritimes Atlantida, SA., Panama and renamed Woodlock. Operated under the management of Wheelock, Marden & Co. Ltd., Hong Kong. Sold in 1964 to Fong Shipping Co., Panama and renamed Loong An. Sold in 1966 to Hyop-Sung Shipping Co., Pusan, South Korea and renamed Dong San. Ran aground near Mukoh, South Korea (37°33′N 129°08′E) on 15 January 1972. Consequently, scrapped that year.

=== Albert Park ===
Albert Park was built by Burrard Dry Dock Co. Ltd., North Vancouver, British Columbia, Dominion of Canada. She was completed on 11 April 1945. Built for the MoWT, she was operated under the management of Canadian Transport Co., Vancouver. Sold to her managers in 1948 and renamed Harmac Victoria. Sold in 1948 to Furness Withy (Canada) Ltd. and renamed Beacon Grange. Sold in 1949 to Conquistador Compania Navigation SA., Panama and renamed Constantinos. Operated under the management of A. Luisi. Reflagged to Greece in 1967. Scrapped at Shanghai, China in 1967.

=== Alder Park ===
Alder Park was built by United Shipyards Ltd., Montreal, Quebec, Dominion of Canada. She was completed on 14 April 1944. Built for the MoWT, she was operated under the management of Canadian Pacific Steamships Ltd. Sold in 1946 to Dominion Shipping Co., Montreal and renamed Arthur Cross. Sold in 1964 to Pacific Trading & Navigation Co., Monrovia, Liberia. Operated under the management of Madrigal Shipping Co. Scrapped at Hong Kong in 1970.

=== Alexandra Park ===
Alexandra Park was built by United Shipyards Ltd. She was completed on 4 December 1944. Built for the MoWT, she was operated under the management of Montreal Shipping Co. Sold in 1946 to Montship Lines, Montreal and renamed Mont Sandra. Operated under the management of Buries, Markes Ltd. Sold in 1953 to Insular Trading Corp., Monrovia and renamed Violando. Sold in 1958 to Seas Trading Corp., Monrovia and renamed Aegean Sea. Sold in 1963 to Republic Log Carriers S.A., Monrovia and renamed Mindenao Logger. Operated under the management of Philippine Merchants Steamship Co. Sold in 1965 to Pacific Coast Shipping Co., Monrovia and renamed Ocean Logger. Operated under the management of Schnitzer Steel Products. Scrapped at Kaohsiung, Taiwan in 1968.

=== Algonquin Park ===
Algonquin Park was built by Marine Industries Ltd., Sorel, Quebec. She was completed on 2 October 1942. Built for the MoWT, she was operated under the management of McLean, Kennedy Ltd. Management transferred to Aviation & Shipping Co. Ltd. in 1946. Sold in 1950 to Fairview Overseas Freighters Ltd, Halifax, Nova Scotia and renamed Johnstar. Operated under the management of C. M. Lemnos & Co. Ltd. Sold in 1957 to Record Shipping Co. S.A., Panama and renamed Santhy. Renamed Glafkos in 1960, operated under the management of C. M. Lemnos & Co. Ltd. Reflagged to Greece later that year. Ran aground 2 nautical miles (3.7 km) east of the Amphitrite Point Lighthouse, Vancouver Island, British Columbia on 2 January 1962. Refloated the next day. Declared a constructive total loss. Scrapped at Victoria, British Columbia by Capital City Iron & Metals. Final dismantling of the hull occurred at Seattle, Washington, United States.

=== Argyle Park ===
Argyle Park was built by St. John Drydock & Shipbuilding Co. Ltd., Saint John, New Brunswick, Dominion of Canada. She was completed on 18 June 1943. Built for the MoWT, she was operated under the management of Interprovincial Steamship Co. Ltd. Sold in 1946 to Mersey Paper Co. Ltd., Liverpool, Nova Scotia and renamed Liverpool Packet. Operated under the management of Markland Shipping Co. Ltd. Sold in 1960 to Bowater Steamship Co., Liverpool, United Kingdom. Sold in 1963 to Westport Compania Navigation, Piraeus, Greece and renamed Westport. Sold in 1965 to Athos Shipping Co. Special S.A., Piraeus and renamed Athos. Sold in 1968 to Compagnia de Navigazione Pinares, Mogadishu, Somalia and renamed Aramis. Scrapped at Split, Yugoslavia in 1976.

=== Arlington Beach Park ===
Arlington Beach Park was a tanker built by West Coast Shipbuilders Ltd, Vancouver. She was completed on 20 February 1944. Built for the MoWT, she was operated under the management of Imperial Oil Ltd. Sold in 1946 to A/S Saguna, Kristiansand, Norway and renamed Agerøen. Operated under the management of H. E. Hansen-Tangen. Sold in 1954 to Franco Maresco fu Mariano, Genoa, Italy. Converted to a cargo ship and renamed Mar Corrusco. Sold in 1959 to Slobodna Plovidba, Šibenik, Yugoslavia, and renamed Subicevac. Sold in 1965 to Aries Shipping Co., Hong Kong and renamed Millstrader. Sold in 1966 to Industrial Leasing & Finance Co., Hong Kong. Sold in 1967 to Marmando Compania Navigation, Panama. Scrapped at Kaohsiung in 1968.

=== Ashby Park ===
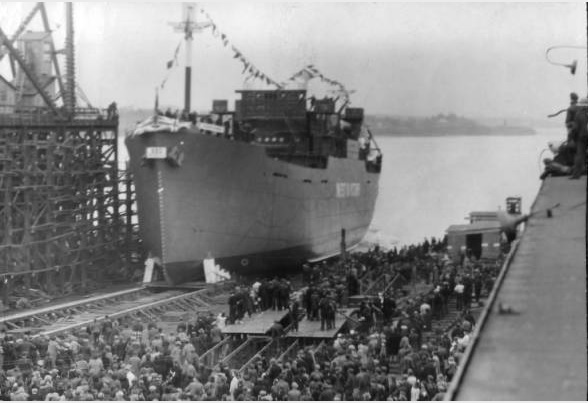
Launch of Ashby Park.

Ashby Park was built by Foundation Maritime Ltd. She was completed on 22 December 1944. She was built for the Park Steamship Co., Montreal. Sold in 1945 to Compania Siderurgica Nacional, Rio de Janeiro, Brazil and renamed Siderurgica Tres. Sold in 1967 to Frota de Petroleiros de Sul-Petrosul, Porto Alegre, Brazil. May have been renamed Albatroz. Scrapped at Rio de Janeiro in 1971.

=== Aspen Park ===
Aspen Park was built by Burrard Dry Dock Co. Ltd. She was completed on 4 April 1944. Built for the MoWT, she was operated under the management of Anglo-Canadian Shipping Co. Sold in 1946 to Western Canada Steamships Ltd., Vancouver and renamed Lake Athabasca. Sold in 1949 to Compania de Transportes Del Mar S.A., Panama and renamed Agathi. Renamed Nissi in 1959. Scrapped at Yokohama, or Kawasaki, Japan in 1967.

=== Atwater Park ===
Atwater Park was built by West Coast Shipbuilders Ltd. She was completed on 23 June 1944. Built for the MoWT, she was operated under the management of Anglo-Canadian Shipping Co. Ltd. Sold in 1946 to Western Canada Steamships Ltd., Vancouver and renamed Lake Atlin. Sold in 1953 to Santa Rita Compania Navigation SA., Monrovia and renamed Halcyon. Reflagged to Greece in 1967. Collided with Gen-Ei Maru in the Kanmon Straits on 31 January 1969. She was beached but broke in two. Scrapped in Japan in 1969.

=== Avondale Park ===
Avondale Park was built by Foundation Maritime Ltd. She was completed on 13 May 1944. Built for the MoWT. Torpedoed and sunk in the Firth of Forth 1 nautical mile (1.9 km) south east of the Isle of May, United Kingdom by U-2336 on 7 May 1945. She was the last British merchant ship to be sunk during World War II.

== B— Park ==
=== Baldwin Park ===
Baldwin Park was built by Davie Shipbuilding & Repairing Co. LtdLauzon, Quebec. She was completed on 24 November 1944. Built for Park Steamship Co., Montreal, she was operated under the management of Pickford & Black Ltd. Sold in 1946 to Chinese Supply Commission, Shanghai, China and renamed Chi Chung. Sold later that year to China Merchants Steam Navigation Co. Ltd., Taipei, China. Sold in 1961 to Kai Tai Marine Lines Ltd., Keelung, Taiwan and renamed Kai Lung. Scrapped at Kaohsiung in 1964.

=== Banff Park ===
Banff Park was built by Davie Shipbuilding and Repairing Co. Ltd. She was completed on3 September 1942. Built for the MoWT, she was operated under the management of McLean, Kennedy Line Ltd. Management transferred to Hugh Hogarth & Sons in 1946, then to Ohlsson Steamship Lines Ltd in 1947 and Constantine Steamship Lines Ltd. in 1949. Sold in 1950 to Rex Shipping Co. Ltd., Halifax and renamed Oakhurst. Operated under the management of Hadjilias & Co. Sold in 1957 to Asturias Shipping Co., Panama and renamed Catalunia, remaining under the management of Hadjilias, under the Liberian flag. Sold in 1960 to Grenehurst Shipping Co, London, United Kingdom. Renamed Xenophon in 1961. Wrecked off Ouessant, France on 26 October 1962. She sank in March 1963.

=== Beaton Park ===
Beaton Park was built by Burrard Dry Dock Co. Ltd. Launched as Fort Mackinac, she was completed as Beaton Parkon 29 October 1943. Built for Park Steamship Co., Montreal, she was placed under the management of North Pacific Shipping Co. Sold in 1946 to Western Canada Steamships Ltd., Vancouver and renamed Lake Babine. Sold in 1951 to Andros Shipping Co., Montreal and renamed Mountainside. Operated under the management of Goulandris Bros. Sold in 1953 to Arucana Compania Armadora S.A., Panama and renamed Santa Marina. Operated under the management of Orion Shipping & Trading Co. Inc. Sold in 1959 to Assimio Compania de Vapores, Panama and renamed Assimina P. Sold in 1960 to Mina Compania de Vapores, Panama. Reflageed to Greece in 1965 and renamed Assimina Piangos. Scrapped at Kaohsiung in 1968.

=== Bell Park ===
Bell Park was built by Davie Shipbuilding & Repairing Co. Ltd. She was completed on 4 June 1945. Built for Park Steamship Co., she was operated under the management of Canadian National Steamships. Sold in 1946 to Federal Commerce & Navigation Co., Montreal. Renamed Federal Pioneer in 1947. Sold in 1950 to Transmaritima Commercio SA., Rio de Janeiro and renamed Sant Helena. Deleted from shipping registers in 1992.

=== Belwoods Park ===
Belwoods Park was built by Marine Industries Ltd. She was launched as Fort Chimo and completed as Belwoods Park on 6 December 1943. Built for Park Steamship Co., Montreal, she was placed under the management of Furness, Withy & Co. To Ministry of Transport (MoT) in 1946 and placed under the management of South American Saint Line. Management changed to G. Heyn & Sons Ltd. in 1950. Sold later that year to Rex Shipping Co., London and renamed Brookhurst. Operated under the management of Hadjilias & Co. Sold in 1957 to Asturias Shipping Co., Monrovia and renamed Galicia. Scrapped at Mihara, Japan in 1967.

=== Beresford Park ===
Beresford Park was built by Foundation Maritime Ltd. She was completed on 24 April 1944. Built for the MoWT, she was operated under the management of Montreal Shipping Co. Ltd. Sold in 1947 to Federal Commerce & Navigation Co. Ltd., Montreal and renamed Federal Ambassador. Sold in 1948 to D/S Jutlandia A/S., Copenhagen, Denmark and renamed Gerda Toft. Operated under the management of Jens Toft A/S. Foundered in the North Sea north west of Schiermonnikoog, Netherlands (54°20′N 6°25′E) on 23 December 1954.

=== Bloomfield Park ===
Bloomfield Park was built by St. John Drydock & Shipbuilding Co. Ltd. She was completed on 2 September 1944 Built for the Park Steamship Co., Montreal, she was operated under the management of Saguenay Terminals Ltd. Sold in 1948 to Saguenay Terminals Ltd., Montreal and renamed Sundale. Reflagged to the United Kingdom in 1954. Sold in 1959 to Caribbean Federation Lines Ltd., Monrovia and renamed Amigo. Operated under the management of Kervin Shipping Co. Renamed Christian S. in 1960. Sold in 1961 to Corporacion Maritima Colombiana, Barranquilla, Colombia. Caught fire at Barranquilla on 4 March 1963. Declared a constructive total loss, she was sold for breaking in July 1963.

=== Bowness Park ===
Bowness Park was built by Burrard Dry Dock Co. Ltd. She was completed on 27 June 1944. Built for Park Steamship Co., Montreal, she was operated under the management of Canadian Transportation Co. Sold in 1947 to Kerr-Silver Lines Ltd., Vancouver and renamed Manx Marine. Sold in 1948 to Orinoco Compania Navigation SA., Panama and renamed Jean. Operated under the management of Global Shipping Co. Ltd, then Moschakis Ltd. Sold in 1957 to Compagnia de Navigation Almirante, Genoa and renamed Seamew. Operated under the management of Salvatores & Racah SRL. Scrapped at Yokohama, or Kawasaki in 1963.

=== Brentwood Bay Park ===
Brentwood Bay Park

Brentwood Bay Park was a Victory tanker built by Victoria Machinery Depot Co. Ltd., Victoria, British Columbia. She was completed on 22 November 1943. Built for Park Steamship Co., Montreal, she was operated under the management of Imperial Oil Ltd. Sold in 1946 to Odd Godager & Co. A/S, Oslo, Norway and renamed Norse King. Sold in 1951 to Rio Verde Compania Navigation, Panama and renamed Dodger. Operated under the management of Capeside Steamship Co. Ltd, then Goulandris Bros. Converted to a cargo ship in 1953. Sold that year to Panamerica Transhipping Co. SA., Panama and renamed Arosa. Sold in 1956 to Eastern Seafaring & Trading Co., Panama and renamed Antonio D. S. Sold in 1959 to Surrendra Overseas Pvt., Bombay, India and renamed Apj Ambar. Scrapped at Calcutta, India in 1962.

=== Bridgeland Park ===
Bridgeland Park was built by North Vancouver Ship Repairs Ltd, North Vancouver. She was launched as Fort Green Lake and completed as Bridgeland Park on 14 September 1944. Built for Park Steamship Co., Montreal, she was placed under the management of Canada Shipping Co. Sold in 1946 to Elder Dempster Lines (Canada) Ltd and renamed Cambray. Reflagged to the United Kingdom in 1950. Sold in 1960 to Compania di Navigation "Somerset" S.A., Panama and renamed Simeto. Operated under the management of S. Tuillier. Scrapped at Bilbao, Spain in 1971.

=== Buffalo Park ===
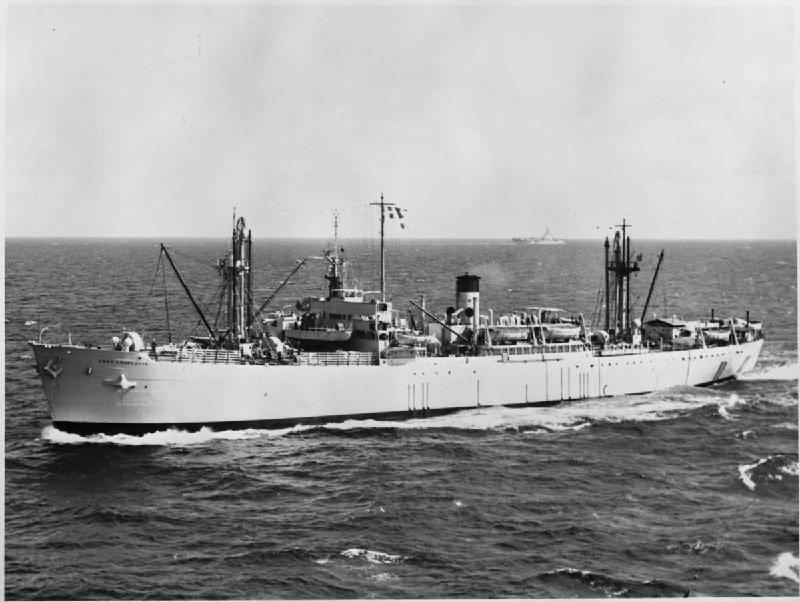
RFA Fort Charlotte

Buffalo Park was built by North Vancouver Ship Repairs Ltd. She was completed on 5 April 1944. Built for the Park Steamship Co., Montreal. To MoWT in 1946. Converted to a stores issuing ship and renamed Fort Charlotte. Operated under the management of Eastern & Australian Steamship Co. To Admiralty in 1947, serving with the Royal Fleet Auxiliary. Scrapped at Singapore in 1968.

== C— Park ==
=== Cartier Park ===
Cartier Park was built by Davie Shipbuilding & Repairing Co. Ltd. She was completed on 8 August 1945. Built for Park Steamship Co., Montreal, she was operated under the management of Canadian National Steamships Ltd. Sold in 1947 to Canadian Victor Ltd., Montreal and renamed Canadian Victor. Operated under the management of Canadian National Steamships Ltd. Sold in 1952 to Canadian National (West Indies) Steamships Ltd. Laid up at Halifax in 1957. Sold in 1958 to Banco Cubana del Comercio Exterior, Havana, Cuba. Sold in 1960 to Oficina de Formento Maritima Cubano, Havana. Scrapped at Bilbao in 1965.

=== Cataraqui Park ===
Cataraqui Park was built by Foundation Maritime Ltd. She was completed on 30 June 1944. Built for the MoWT, she was operated under the management of William Robertson Shipowners Ltd. Sold in 1946 to Central Supply Co. of Indo-China, Saigon and renamed Pignea de Baheine. Sold in 1955 to Companie Asiatique de Navigation, Djibouti, French Somaliland and renamed Ambouli. Renamed Mukali in 1958. Sold in 1963 to Neptune Maritime Corp., Monrovia and renamed Waywind. Sold in 1967 to Hiwind Navigation Corp., Monrovia. Scrapped at Hong Kong in 1969.

=== Champlain Park ===
Champlain Park was built by Marine Industries Ltd. She was completed on 7 December 1944. Built for Park Steamship Co., Montreal, she was operated under the management of Furness Withy & Co. Sold in 1946 to Mersey Paper Co. Ltd., Liverpool, Nova Scotia and renamed Vinland. Operated under the management of Markland Shipping Co. Sold in 1959 to Wallem & Co., Hong Kong and renamed Vinkon. Sold in 1960 to Oversea United Shipping & Trading Co., Hong Kong. Wrecked in a typhoon at Tolo Harbour, Hong Kong on 1 September 1962. Scrapped in Hong Kong in 1963.

=== Chignecto Park ===
Chignecto Park was built by Foundation Maritime Ltd. She was completed on 29 March 1944. Built for the MOWT, she was operated under the management of E. R. Newbigin Ltd. Transferred to the French Government in 1946. To Centre d'Approvisionnement de l'Indo-Chine, Saigon and renamed Alexandre de Rhodes. Operated under the management of Chargeurs Réunis. Sold in 1948 to Compagnie Asiatique de Navigation, Haiphong, French Indo-China, remaining under the management of Chargeurs Réunis. Reflagged to French Somaliland in 1956. Scrapped in Hong Kong in 1965.

=== Chippewa Park ===
Chippewa Park was built by Davie Shipbuilding & Repairing Co. Ltd. She was completed on2 August 1943. Built for the Park Steamship Co., Montreal, she was operated under the management of McLean, Kennedy Ltd. Sold in 1946 to Argonaut Navigation Co. Ltd., Montreal and renamed Argobec. Operated under the management of John C. Yemelos, then A. Luisi. Reflagged to the United Kingdom in 1951. On 10 April 1955, she was fired upon by Egyptian authorities at the entrance to the Gulf of Aqaba. The British Government protested to the Egyptian Government through diplomatic channels. Egypt was trying to claim the Gulf as territorial waters, rather than international waters. Sold in 1959 to Strovile Compania Navigation, Piraeus and renamed Rahiotis Scrapped at Shanghai in 1965.

=== Clearwater Park ===
Clearwater Park was a Victory tanker built by Victoria Machinery Co. Ltd. She was completed on 19 January 1944. Built for the Park Steamship Co., Montreal, she was operated under the management of Shell Canadian Tankers Ltd. Sold in 1946 Rederi A/S Norseking, Oslo and renamed Norse Mountain. Operated under the management of Odd Godager & Co. A/S. Sold in 1951 to Tioga Star Corp., or Hemisphere Development Corp, Monrovia and renamed Tioga Star. Operated under the management of Sieling & Jarvis Corp. Sold in 1955 to Mariblanca Navigation SA., Monrovia, converted to a cargo ship and renamed Marinegra. Operated under the management of Chandris. Sold in 1966 to A. Halcoussis, Piraeus and renamed Lorenzo. Scrapped at Shanghai in 1968.

=== Confederation Park ===
Confederation Park was built by Foundation Maritime Ltd. She was completed on 3 June 1944. Built for the Park Steamship Co., Montreal. Subsequently transferred to the MoWT. Sold in 1946 to Compagnie de Transportes Oceaniques, Paris, France and renamed Gialong. Sold in 1956 to Compagnie de Transportes Maritimes de l'Ouest Africain, Konraki, French Guinea and renamed Obokil. Operated under the management of Chargeurs Réunis. Sold in 1961 to Concordia Kinabatangan Shipping, Panama and renamed Tawau Bay. Sold in 1966 to Chen An Navigation Co., Panama and renamed Shin Chong. Scrapped at Keelung in 1970, or 1971.

=== Connaught Park ===
Connaught Park was built by North Vancouver Ship Repairs Ltd. She was completed on27 June 1944. Built for the Park Steamship Co., Montreal, she was operated under the management of Seaboard Shipping Ltd., Vancouver. Sold to her managers in 1946 and renamed Seaboard Ranger. Sold in 1950 to Compagnie Maritimes del Este, Panama and renamed Ranger. Operated under the management of Goulandris Bros. (Hellas) Ltd. Sold in 1954 to San Pedro Compania Armadora, Panama. Scrapped at Tsuneishi Japan in 1968.

=== Cornish Park ===
Cornish Park was built by West Coast Shipbuilders Ltd. She was launched as Fort Grand Rapids on 31 August 1944, and completed on 29 October as Cornish Park. Built for the Canadian Government, she was operated under the management of Park Steamship Co. To MoT in 1945 and renamed Fort Beauharnois. Operated under the management of Lyle Shipping Co. To the Admiralty in 1947. Entered service with the Royal Fleet Auxiliary. Withdrawn from service on 23 April 1962. Arrived at La Spezia, Italy on 9 November 1962 for scrapping by Cantieri Navali Santa Maria. Scrapping occurred in 1963.

=== Coronation Park ===
Coronation Park was built by Burrard Dry Dock Co. Ltd. She was completed on 1 November 1944. Built for the Park Steamship Co., Montreal, she was operated under the management of Seaboard Shipping Co., Vancouver. Sold to her managers in 1946 and renamed Seaboard Star. Sold in 1954 to Belmar Compania Navigation SA, Panama and renamed Classic. Operated under the management of Ormos Shipping Co. Ltd. Reflagged to Greece in 1960. Scrapped at Shanghai in 1968.

=== Crescent Park ===
Crescent Park was built by Foundation Maritime Ltd. Launched as Camp Debert, she was completed as Crescent Park on 2 June 1943. Built for Park Steamship Co., Montreal. Later transferred to MoWT. Sold in 1945 to Rederi A/B A. T. Jonasson, Raa, Sweden and renamed Julia. Sold in 1946 to Ese Bancks Rederi A/S, Helsingborg, Sweden and renamed Lona. Caught fire at Hull, United Kingdom on 9 September 1956 and was scuttled. Fire extinguished on 11 September. Refloated, but declared a constructive total loss. Sold in 1956 to Reederei Kapitän Heinrich Krohn, GmbH., Travemünde and renamed Senator Hagelstein. Towed to a West German port in 1957, converted to a motor vessel. Sold in 1962 to Elpisaga Compania Navigation, Beirut, Lebanon and renamed Agia Sophia. Renamed Manos Lemos in 1967. Ran aground at Kuşadası, Turkey in 1969 and consequently scrapped at Sığacık.

=== Cromwell Park ===
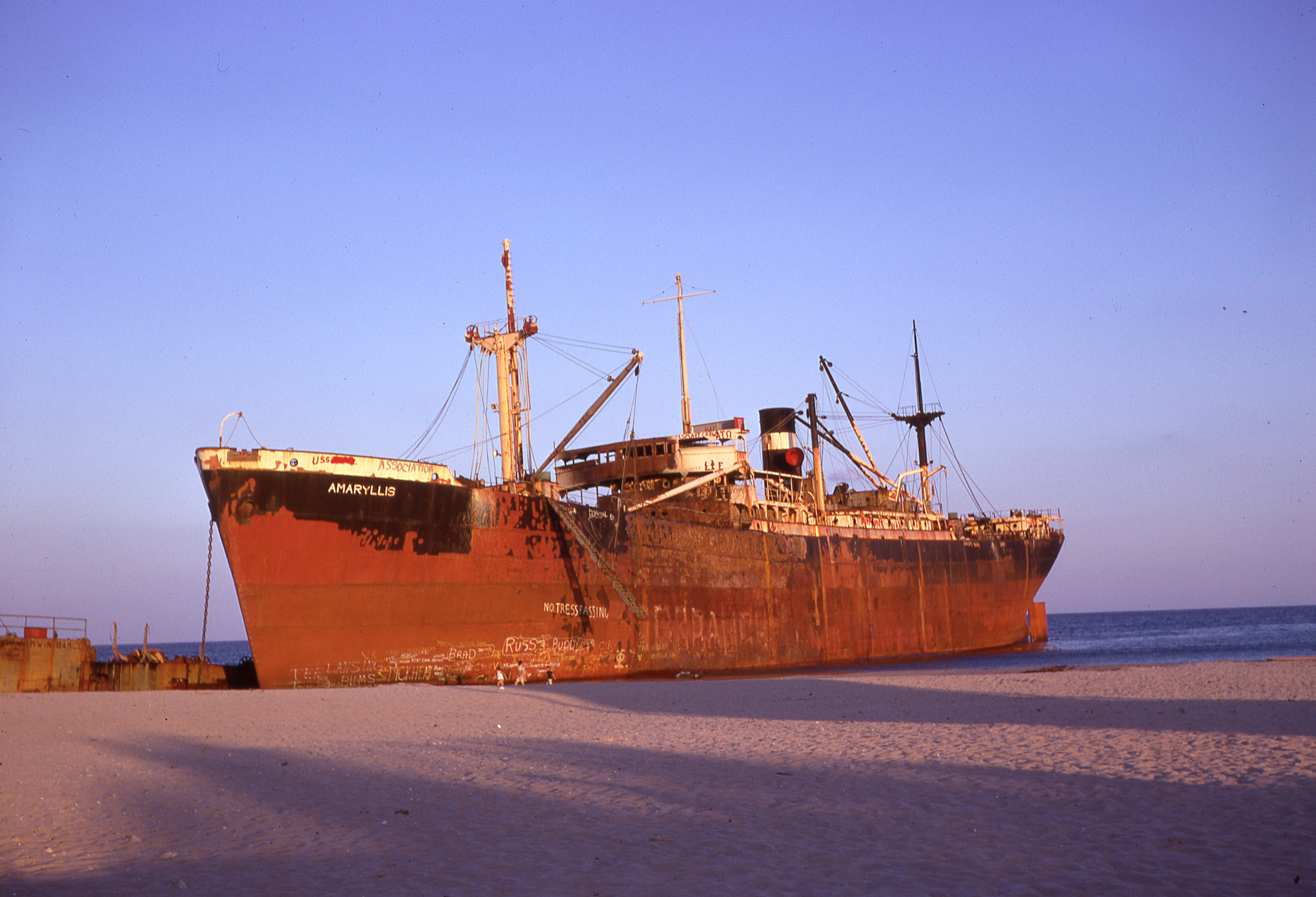
The wreck of Amaryllis, August 1967.

Cromwell Park was built by Burrard Dry Dock Co. Ltd. She was completed on 14 February 1945. Built for Park Steamship Co., Montreal, she was operated under the management of Canadian Transport Co., Vancouver. Sold to her managers in 1946 and renamed Harmac Vancouver. Sold in 1948 to Amaryllis Steamship Co. Ltd., Panama and renamed Amaryllis. Operated under the management of S. G. Embiricos. Driven ashore in a hurricane at Riviera Beach, Florida, United States on 8 September 1965. Abandoned as a constructive total loss.

=== Crystal Park ===
Crystal Park was built by North Vancouver Ship Repairs Ltd. She was completed on 2 May 1944. Built for Park Steamship Co., Montreal, she was operated under the management of Canadian Pacific Steamships. Sold in 1946 to Elder Dempster Lines (Canada) Ltd. and renamed Chandler. Reflagged to the United Kingdom in 1950. Sold in 1960 to Compania de Navigaiton Indomitus, Panama and renamed Natale. Operated under the management of S. Tuillier. Scrapped at La Spezia in 1969.

=== Cypress Hills Park ===
Cypress Hills Park was a Victory tanker built by Victoria Machinery Depot Co. Ltd. She was completed on 22 February 1944. Built for Park Steamship Co., Montreal, she was operated under the management of Imperial Oil Co. Renaming to La Mede proposed in 1946. Sold that year to Jorgen P. Jensen, Hisøy, Norway and renamed Gundine. Suffered an onboard explosion at Port of Spain, Trinidad on 2 June 1952 in which five people were killed. Sold in 1954 to Sterling Shipping Co. Ltd., London and renamed Sterling Venture. Converted to a cargo ship in 1955. Sold in 1956 Alcyone Shipping Co., London and renamed Alcyone Angel. Sold in 1958 to Nolido Cia de Nav SA, Monrovia and renamed Fidelity. Operated under the management of Marcou & Sons (Shipbrokers) Ltd. Sold in 1960 to Compania Beta de Vapores S.A., Piraeus and renamed Betaluna. Sold in 1968 to Thakur Shipping Co., Bombay and renamed Varuna Duti. Scrapped at Bombay in 1971.

== D— Park ==
=== Dartmouth Park ===
Dartmouth Park was built by St. John Drydock & Shipbuilding Co. Ltd. Launched as Camp Sussex, she was as completed Dartmouth Park on 29 April 1943. Built for Park Steamship Co., Montreal, she was subsequently transferred to the MoWT. Sold in 1946 to Northern Star Steamship Co. of Canada, Montreal and renamed Captain Polemis. Renamed Lumberman in 1949. Sold to Thalatta Steamship Corp., Panama in 1952 and renamed Chepo. Sold later that year to Sociètè Nationale d'Affrêtements, Paris and renamed S.N.A.6. Sold in 1963 to Compania Maritima Santa Barbara, Panama and renamed Tourliani. Caught fire in the Indian Ocean (27°41′N 50°27′E) on 5 August 1966. Declared a constructive total loss. Sold in 1967 to Mohamed Taber Alsharif, Bahrain. Sold in 1969 to Ahmed Mohamed Naser Al-Shabain, Kuwait. Scrapped at Gadani Beach, Pakistan in 1974.

=== Dentonia Park ===
Dentonia Park was built by United Shipyards Ltd. She was completed on 7 August 1944. Built for Park Steamship Co., Montreal, she was operated under the management of Canadian Pacific Steamships Ltd. To MoT in 1946, operated under the management of Watts, Watts & Co. Ltd. Management transferred in 1950 to Douglas & Ramsey. Sold later that year to Halifax Overseas Freighters, London and renamed Cedar Hill. Operated under the management of Counties Ship Management. Sold in 1964 to Counties Steam Navigation Co, remaining under the same management. Scrapped at Hirao in 1966.

=== Dominion Park ===
Dominion Park was built by West Coast Shipbuilders Ltd. She was launched as Fort Mackinac and completed as Dominion Park on 13 August 1944. Built for Park Steamship Co., Montreal, she was placed under the management of Canadian-Australasian Line, Vancouver. Sold to her managers in 1946 and renamed Waihemo. Remaining under the management of Canadian-Australasian Line. Sold in 1962 to Union Steamship Company of New Zealand, Wellington. Sold in 1966 to Pacific Trading & Navigation Ltd., Panama and renamed Maris Susana. Sold in 1969 to Pac-Trade Navigation Co., Panama. Scrapped at Kaohsiung in 1972.

=== Dorval Park ===
Dorval Park was built by North Vancouver Ship Repairs Ltd. She was completed on 30 May 1944. Built for Park Steamship Co., Montreal, she was placed under the management of North Pacific Shipping Co. Sold in 1946 to Western Canada Steamships Ltd., Vancouver and renamed Lake Canim. Renamed Durham Bay in 1950 and placed under the management of Lyle Shipping Co. Ltd. Sold in 1954 to Sociètè des Transportes Maritimes, Panama and renamed Sea Rover. Operated under the management of Embiricos. Renamed Niobe in 1960. Collided with, and sank, a Japanese fishing boat on 21 February 1960. Niobe rescued ten of her sixteen crew. Scrapped at Onomichi, Japan in 1967.

=== Dufferin Park ===
Dufferin Park was built by Davie Shipbuilding & Repair Co. Ltd. Launched as Camp Farnham, she was completed as Dufferin Park on 5 August 1943. Built for Park Steamship Co., Montreal, she was operated under the management of Pickford & Black Ltd. Sold in 1946 to Picbel Ltd., Halifax and renamed Dufferin Bell. Ran ashore at Framboise Cove, Cape Breton Island, Nova Scotia on 13 May 1951. Declared a total loss.

=== Dundurn Park ===
Dundurn Park was built by North Vancouver Ship Repairs Ltd. She was completed on 28 November 1943. Built for Park Steamship Co., Montreal, she was operated under the management of Canada Shipping Co. Ltd. Sold in 1946 to Canadian Shipowners Ltd, Montreal and renamed Marchdale. Sold in 1948 to Moihamed Nemazee, Hong Kong and renamed Shahin. Operated under the manabgement of Wallem & Co. Sold in 1953 to Compagnia de Navigazione Giuseppe Mazzini, Genoa and renamed Stella. Scrapped at La Spezia in September 1965.

=== Dunlop Park ===
Dunlop Park was built by Burrard Dry Dock Co. Ltd. She was completed on 11 August 1944. Built for Park Steamship Co., Montreal, she was operated under them management of Canada Shipping Co. Sold in 1946 to Western Canada Steamships Ltd., Vancouver and renamed Lake Chilco. Sold in 1949 to Compania de Navigation Annitsa, SA, Panama and renamed Annitsa L. Operated under the management of Seres Shipping Inc. Reflagged to Greece in 1958. Sold in 1964 to Oriana Inc., Panama and renamed Oriana. Sold in 1966 to Navemar S.A., Callao, Peru. Scrapped at Kaohsiung in 1967.

== E— Park ==
=== Earlscourt Park ===
Earlscourt Park was built by Prince Rupert Drydock & Shipyard. She was launched ads Fort Conti and completed as Earlscourt Park on 30 April 1944. Built for Park Steamship Co., Montreal, she was placed under the management of Empire Shipping Co. Sold in 1946 to Western Canada Steamships Ltd., Vancouver and renamed Lake Chilliwack. Renamed Mossel Bay in 1950 and placed under the management of Sir R. Ropner & Co. (Management) Ltd. Sold in 1954 to Liberian Freighters Corp., Monrovia and renamed Noutsi. Ran aground 2 nautical miles (3.7 km) from Constanţa, Romania on 28 March 1965. Declared a total loss.

=== Eastwood Park ===
Eastwood Park was built by United Shipyards Ltd. She was completed on 23 October 1944. Built for Park Steamship Co., Montreal, she was operated under the management of Cunard White Star Line Ltd. Sold in 1948 to Saguenay Terminals Ltd., London and renamed Sunavis. Renamed Sunkirk in 1953, and reflagged to Canada. Reflagged to the United Kingdom in 1955. Sold in 1960 to Pacific Trading & Navigation Ltd., Monrovia and renamed Ameise. Scrapped at Kaohsiung in 1971.

=== Eglinton Park ===
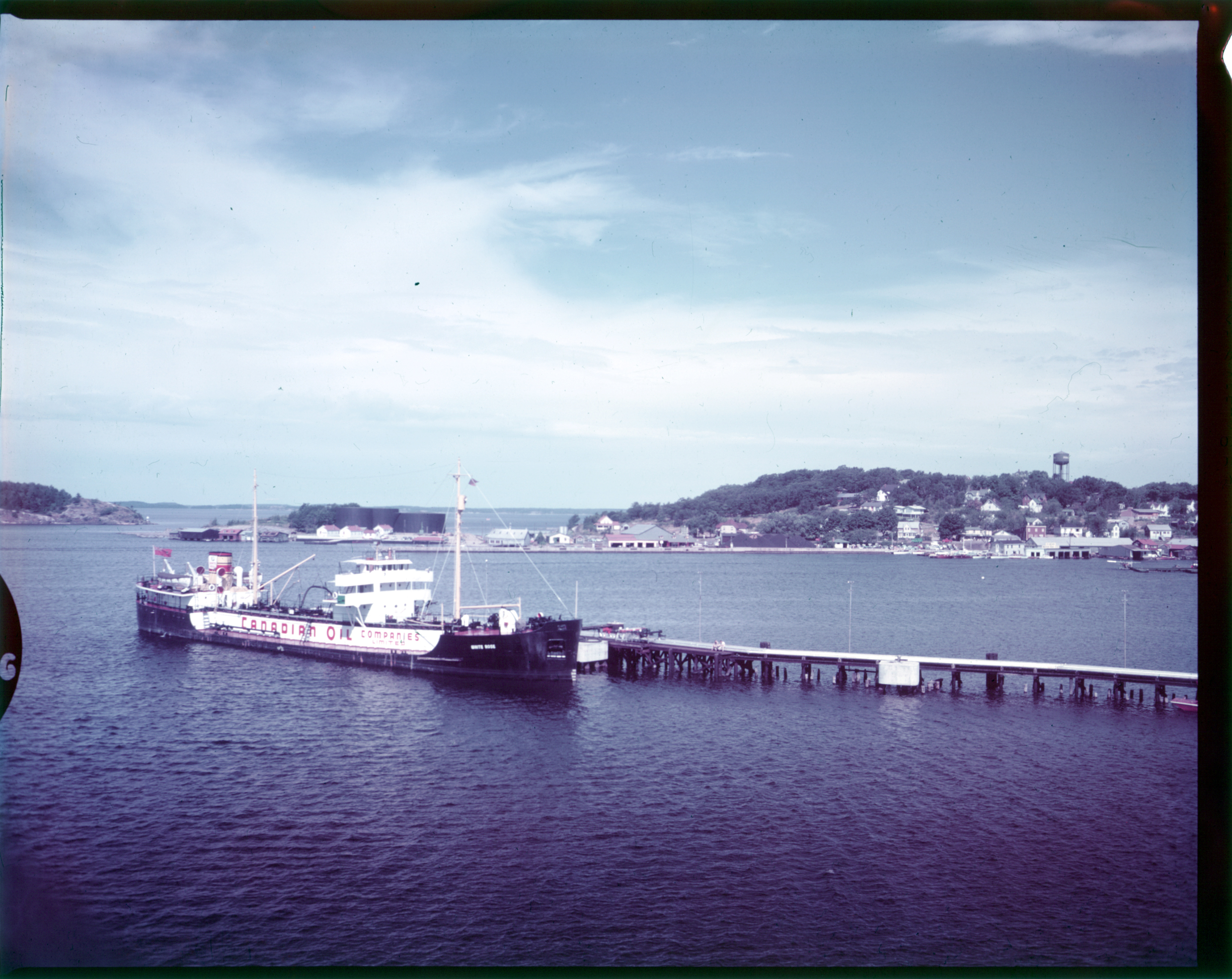
White Rose

Eglinton Park was a Victory tanker built by Marine Industries Ltd. She was completed on 10 June 1944. Built for Park Steamship Co., Montreal, she was operated under the management of Imperial Oil Ltd. Sold in 1945 to Canadian Oil Companies Ltd., Toronto and renamed John Irwin. Sold in 1953 to White Rose Ltd., Montreal. Renamed White Rose II, then White Rose in 1956. Sold in 1964 to Shell Canada Ltd., Toronto. Renamed Fuel Marketer in 1970. Sold in 1972 to Shell Canadian Tankers Ltd., Toronto. Converted to a barge in 1979. Scrapped in Ontario in 1989.

=== Elgin Park ===
Elgin Park was built by Prince Rupert Drydock & Shipyard. She was launched as Fort Simcoe and completed as Elgin Park on 23 February 1945. Built for Park Steamship Co., Montreal, she was placed under the management of Seaboard Shipping Co. Sold in 1946 to Furness Withy (Canada) Ltd., Montreal and renamed Royal Prince. Sold in 1949 to Navegacion Maritima Panama, Panama and renamed Atlantic Star. Operated under the management of S. Livanos & Co. Inc. Sold in 1953 to Atlantic Freighters Ltd., Panama. Sold in 1961 to Faik Zeren, Istanbul, Turkey and renamed Nadir. Scrapped at Istanbul in 1972.

=== Elk Island Park ===
Elk Island Park was built by United Shipyards Ltd. She was completed on 28 June 1943. Built for Park Steamship Co., Montreal, she was placed under the management of Constantine Line (Canada) Ltd. Sold in 1946 to Dominion Shipping Co. Ltd., Sydney, Nova Scotia and renamed Louisbourg. Reflagged to Liberia in 1964. Sold in 1965 to Pacific Trading & Navigation Ltd., Monrovia. Sold in 1971 to Incop Shipping Corp., Monrovia and renamed Asifar. Renamed Lightening later that year. Struck a mine off Chalna, East Pakistan in 1972. Scrapped at Chittagong, Bangladesh in 1976.

=== Elm Park ===
Elm Park was built by Marine Industries Ltd. She was completed on 28 May 1943. Built for Park Steamship Co., Montreal, she was placed under the management of Cunard White Star Line Ltd. Sold in 1946 to Triton Steamship Co. Ltd, Montreal and renamed Tricape. Operated under the management of March Shipping Agency Ltd. Reflagged to the United Kingdom in 1950. Ran aground on the Goodwin Sands on 18 August 1953 but was refloated. Sold in 1957 to Nueva Sevilla Compania Navigation and renamed Palma Operated under the management of N. J. Goulandris Ltd. Ran aground off Amrum, West Germany on 31 July 1964 and broke in two. Declared a total loss.

=== Evangeline Park ===
Evangeline Park was built by Foundation Maritime Ltd. She was completed on13 April 1945. Built for Park Steamship Co., Montreal, she was operated under the management of Interprovincial Steamship Co. Sold in 1947 to Federal Commerce & Navigation Co., Montreal and renamed Federal Marine. Sold in 1950 to Commercio de Petrolia, Rio de Janeiro and renamed Santa Monica. Sold in 1954 to Navegacão Mercantil SA., Rio de Janeiro and renamed Navem Monica. Deleted from shipping registers in 1992, presumed scrapped.

== F— Park ==
=== Fairmount Park ===
Fairmount Park was built by Burrard Dry Dock Co. Ltd. She was completed on 31 January 1945. Built for the Park Steamship Co., Montreal, she was operated under the management of Montreal, Australia, New Zealand Line. Sold in 1946 to Bristol City Line (Canada) Ltd., Montreal and renamed Montreal City. Sold in 1959 to Polska Zegluga Morska, Szczecin, Poland and renamed Huta Baildon. Converted to a barge in 1969. Scrapped in Poland in 1980.

=== Fawkner Park ===
Fawkner Park was built by St. John Drydock & Shipbuilding Co. Ltd. She was completed on 21 January 1944. Built for the Park Steamship Co., Montreal. Transferred to Australian Government. Sold in 1947 to McIlwraith, McEacharn Ltd., Melbourne, Australia and renamed Kooralya. Renamed Mandarin Star in 1960, and reflagged to Hong Kong. Sold in 1964 to Mandarin Shipping Co., Monrovia. Sold in 1967 to Fortune Bay Shipping Co., Monrovia and renamed Fortune Bay. Sold later that year to Dragon Sea Transport Co., Panama and renamed Dragonboat. Scrapped at Izumiōtsu, Japan in 1968.

=== Frontenac Park ===
Frontenac Park was built by Marine Industries Ltd. She was completed on 17 November 1944. Built for Park Steamship Co., Montreal, she was operated under the management of Constantine Lines Ltd. Sold in 1946 to Acadia Overseas Freighters Ltd., Halifax and renamed Victoria County. Operated under the management of I. H. Mathers & Son Ltd. Sold in 1950 to Iberia Compania Maritime SA., Puerto Cortes, Honduras and renamed Akron. Operated under the management of Hadjidas & Co. Ran aground south of Ras Al Ardh, Kuwait on 28 March 1963. Refloated on 30 March, towed to Tsuneishi and scrapped.

== G— Park ==
=== Garden Park ===
Garden Park was built by Burrard Dry Dock Co. Ltd. She was completed on 28 March 1945. Built for Park Steamship Co., Montreal, she was operated under the management of Canadian Shipping Co. Ltd. Sold in 1946 to Western Canada Steamships Ltd., Vancouver and renamed Lake Cowichan. Sold in 1949 to Tramp Chartering Corp., S.A., Panama and renamed Annitsa. Operated under the management of J. Carras. Sold in 1956 to Vallecas Compania Navigation, Panama. Reflagged to Greece in 1960. Scrapped at Tsuneishi in 1967.

=== Gaspesian Park ===
Gaspesian Park was built by Prince Rupert Drydock & Shipyard. She was completed on 22 July 1945. Built for Park Steamship Co., Montreal, she was operated under the management of Montreal Shipping Co. Ltd. Sold in 1946 to Montship Lines Ltd., Montreal and renamed Mont Gaspi. Operated under management of Associated Buries Markes Ltd. Sold in 1954 to Compania de Navigation para Viajes Globales AS, Panama and renamed Polyseni, flying the Costa Rican flag. Operated under the management of Demosthenes P. Margaronis. Reflagged to Greece in 1959. Ran aground on the Carapebus Shoal, off Vitória, Brazil on 6 February 1965 and declared a constructive total loss. Towed to Valencia, Spain in August 1965 for scrapping.

=== Gatineau Park ===
Gatineau Park was built by Davie Shipbuilding & Repairing Co. Ltd. She was completed on 23 July 1942. Built for Park Steamship Co., Montreal, she was operated under the management of Canadian Pacific Steasmships Ltd. Transferred to MoT in 1946, operated under the management of Aviation & Shipping Co. Sold in 1950 to Cape Breton Freighters Ltd., Montreal and renamed Alkis Operated under the management of S. G. Embiricos Ltd. Sold in 1955 to Alcibiades Compania Navigation, Monrovia. Sold in 1965 to Acer Shipping Corp., Monrovia and renamed Acer. Sold in 1969 to Compania de Navigation Corriente, Monrovia and renamed Melia. Scrapped at Onomichi in 1970.

=== Glacier Park ===
Glacier Park was built by Marine Industries Ltd. She was completed on 13 December 1942. Built for Park Steamship Co., Montreal, she was operated under the management of Cunard White Star Ltd. Sold in 1946 to Dominion Shipping Co. Ltd., Sydney, Nova Scotia and renamed Wabana. Operated under the management of Dominion Steel & Coal Corp., Ltd. Collided with RMS Scythia in the Gulf of Saint Lawrence on 5 June 1952 and lost her propeller. Reflagged to Liberia in 1964. Sold in 1965 to Pacific Trading & Navigation Ltd., Monrovia. Operated under the management of Madrigal Shipping Co. Scrapped at Kaohsiung in 1972.

=== Goldstream Park ===
Goldstream Park was built by North Vancouver Ship Repairs Ltd. Launched as Fort Harrison, she was completed as Goldstream Park on 7 November 1944. Built for Park Steamship Co., Montreal, she was operated under the management of North Pacific Shipping Co. Ltd. Sold in 1946 to Elder Dempster Lines (Canada) Ltd. and renamed Cottrell. Reflagged to the United Kingdom in 1950. Sold in 1961 to Compania de Navigation "Somerset", Panama and renamed Santagata, Scrapped at Blyth, United Kingdom in 1971.

=== Grafton Park ===
Grafton Park was built by United Shipyards Ltd. She was completed on 13 October 1944. Built for Park Steamship Co., Montreal, she was operated under the management of Canadian Pacific Steamships Ltd. Sold in 1948 to Saguenay Terminals Ltd., Montreal and renamed Sunray. Renamed Sunjarv in 1953. Reflagged to the United Kingdom in 1955. Sold in 1961 to Marsegur Compania Navigation, Piraeus and renamed Katerina. Scrapped at Onomichi in 1967.

=== Green Gables Park ===
Green Gables Park was built by North Vancouver Ship Repairs Ltd. She was launched as Fort Esperance and completed as Green Gables Park on 7 July 1943. Built for Park Steamship Co, Montreal, she was operated under the management of Canada Shipping Co. Sold in 1946 to Dolphin Steamship Co., Montreal and renamed Papachristidis Vassilios. Broke down in the Indian Ocean in July 1948 and drifted for ten days. Taken in tow for Fremantle, Australia by Kybra. Renamed Worldtrotter in 1949. Sold in 1953 to Efcarriers Co., Monrovia and renamed Marcos. Reflagged to Greece in 1959. Sold in 1960 to Transfruit Shipping Co., Piraeus. Sold in 1963 to Marprimera Compania Navigation, Piraeus and renamed Esperanza. Sold in 1965 to Kwong Hing Shipping Co., Panama and renamed Kwong Lee. Scrapped at Kaohsiung in 1968.

=== Green Hill Park ===
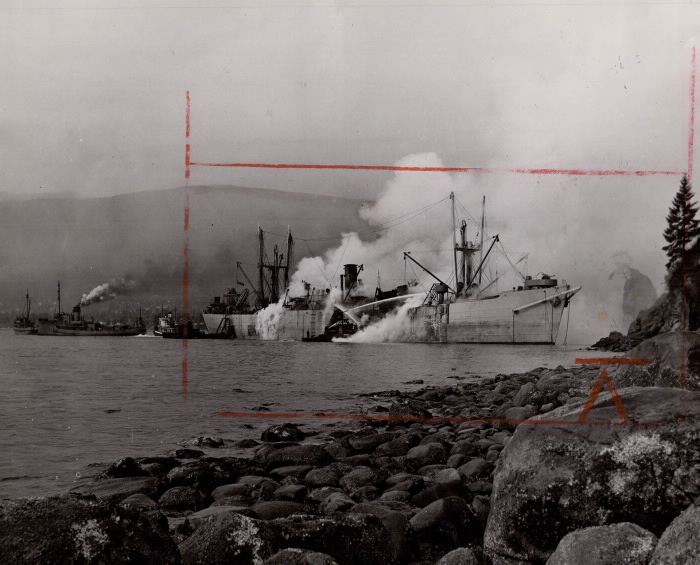
The beached Green Hill Park.

Green Hill Park was built by Burrard Dry Dock Co. Ltd. She was completed on 25 January 1944. Built for Park Steamship Co., Montreal, she was operated under the management of Canada Shipping Co. Caught fire and exploded at Vancouver on 6 March 1945 and was beached. Refloated on 12 March, but declared a constructive total loss. Sold in 1946 to Polar Compania de Navigation Ltda., Panama and renamed Phaeax II. Operated under the management of Spyridon Paramythiotis. Sold in 1967 to Compania Armadora San Francisco SA., Genoa and renamed Lagos Michigan Scrapped at Kaohsiung in 1967.

== H— Park ==
=== Hamilton Park ===
Hamilton Park was built by Morton Engineering & Drydock Co. Ltd., Quebec City. She was completed on 12 July 1945. Built for Park Steamship Co., Montreal, she was operated under the management of Saguenay Terminals Ltd. Sold in 1946 to Canadian Coastwise Carriers, Montreal. Renamed D'Arcy McGee in 1948. Sold later that year to Halcyon-Lijn NV., Rotterdam, Netherlands and renamed Stad Dordrecht. Renamed Serena Secondo in 1962. Sold that year to Compania Marittima Asociadas, Beirut and renamed Sirena II. Sold in 1970 to Toronto Navigation Co., Panama and renamed Hemily. Scrapped at La Spezia in 1972.

=== Hampstead Park ===
Hampstead Park was built by United Shipyards Ltd. She was completed on 13 November 1944. Built for Park Steamship Co., Montreal, she was operated under the management of Canadian Pacific Steamships Ltd. Sold in 1946 to Dingwall Shipping Co. Ltd., Halifax and renamed Cheticamp. Operated under the management of Constantine Line (Canada) Ltd. Sold in 1955 to Sicilarmo Società di Navigazione per Azioni, Palermo, Sicily, Italy and renamed Carini. Scrapped at Valencia in October 1965.

=== Hastings Park ===
Hastings Park was built by Victoria Machinery Co. Ltd. Built as Fort St. Ignace, she was completed as Hastings Park on 17 August 1944. Built for Park Steamship Co., Montreal, she was operated under the management of Empire Shipping Ltd. Sold in 1946 to Western Canada Steamships Co., Vancouver and renamed Kamloops Lake. Sold in 1950 to Navarra Compania Navigation, Panama and renamed Lavadara. Sold in 1952 to Muhammadi Steamships Co., Karachi and renamed Al Sayyada. Scrapped in Karachi in 1967.

=== Hector Park ===
Hector Park was built by Foundation Maritime Ltd. Launched as Hector Park, she was completed as Camp Debert on 19 January 1944. Built for the MoWT, she was operated under the management of William Dickinson & Co. Ltd. Sold in 1946 to Center d'Approvisionment de l'Indo-Chine, Saigon and renamed Capitaine Do Huu VI. Sold in 1950 to Compagnie Cotière de l'Annam, Saigon and renamed Kontum. It was reported that the Greek steamship Alfios struck the wreck of Kontum off Saigon (10°20′N 103°03′E) on 5 April 1952 and was wrecked. Sold in 1955 to Wallem & Co., Hong Kong and renamed Lynghein. Sold in 1956 to Uwajima Unyou KK., Uwajima, Japan and renamed South Hope. Renamed Takashima Maru in 1957. Converted to motor vessel in 1958. Scrapped at Keelung in 1959.

=== High Park ===
High Park was built by Davie Shipbuilding & Repairing Co. Ltd, She was completed on 2 July 1943. Built for Park Steamship Co., Montreal, she was operated under the management of Furness Withy & Co. Transferred to MoT in 1946, operated under the management of Aviation & Shipping Co. Ltd. Operated under the management of Counties Ship Management. Sold in 1950 to Falaise Steamship Co. Ltd., Halifax and renamed Woldingham Hill. Collided with the French trawler Lavardin II off Cape Finisterre, Spain on 25 October 1963. Sold in 1964 to Black Lion Investment Co., remaining under the same managers. Scrapped at Keelung in 1967.

=== Highland Park ===
Highland Park was built by North Vancouver Ship Repairs Ltd. She was completed on 5 June 1945. Built for Park Steamship Co., Montreal, she was operated under the management of Montreal, Australia and New Zealand Line. Sold in 1948 to Saguenay Terminals Ltd., London and renamed Sunjewel. Reflagged to United Kingdom in 1954. Renamed Leefoon in 1960. Sold that year to Yick Fung Shipping & Enterprises Co., Hong Kong and renamed Shun Fung. Wrecked in a typhoon at Hong Kong on 5 September 1964.

=== Hillcrest Park ===
Hillcrest Park was built by United Shipyards Ltd. She was completed on 11 May 1944. Built for Park Steamship Co., Montreal, she was operated under the management of Cunard White Star Line. Transferred to MoT in 1946, remaining under the same management. Sold in 1950 to Counties Ship Management, London and renamed Bembridge Hill. Trapped by ice off the Polish coast on 30 March 1955 and damaged her rudder. Sold in 1957 to Marproeza Compania Navigation SA., Panama and renamed Elimarie. Operated under the management of Bray Shipping Co. Ltd. Sold in 1965 to Taiwan Maritime Transportation Co., Keelung and renamed Tai Fong. Scrapped at Kaohsiung in 1968.

== J— Park ==
=== Jasper Park ===
Jasper Park

Jasper Park was built by Davie Shipbuilding & Repairing Co. Ltd. She was completed on 24 September 1942. Built for Park Steamship Co., Montreal, she was operated under the management of Furness Withy & Co. Torpedoed and sunk in the Indian Ocean (32°52′S 42°15′E) by U-177 on 6 July 1943.

== K— Park ==
=== Kawartha Park ===
Kawartha Park was built by Marine Industries Ltd. She was completed on 27 June 1944. Built for Park Steamship Co., Montreal, she was operated under the management of March Shipping Agency. Collided with the tug Moose in the River Mersey on 28 July 1945. Moose sank with the loss of six of her nine crew. To MoT in 1946, operated under the management of South American Saint Line. Management changed to A. Crawford & Co. in 1949 and then W. H. Seager & Co. in 1950. Sold that year to Kawartha Steamship Co., London and renamed Haverton Hill. Operated under the management of Counties Ship Management Ltd. Renamed Grand Hermine in 1955 and placed under the management of Papachristidia Co. Sold in 1960 to Canuck Lines, Montreal and renamed Canuck Trader, remaining under the same manager. Reflagged to the Bahamas in 1963. Sold in 1965 to Quincy Chuang, Hong Kong and renamed Eliza. Operated under the management of Hong Kong Shipowners & Managers Ltd. Scrapped at Hong Kong in 1968.

=== Kelowna Park ===
Kelowna Park was built by Foundation Maritime Ltd. She was completed on 25 July 1944. Built for Park Steamship Co., Montreal, she was operated under the management of Pickford & Black Ltd. Sold in 1948 to Seagull Steamship Co. of Canada Ltd., Montreal and renamed La Petite Hermine. To Indian Navy in 1952. Commissioned as the repair ship INS Dharini in 1960. Deleted from the navy list in 1988.

=== Kensington Park ===
Kensington Park was built by Foundation Maritime Ltd. She was completed on 6 October 1942. She was built for Park Steamship Co., Montreal, but was subsequently transferred to the MoWT. Sold in 1945 to Société des Afreteurs Maritimes, Saigon and renamed Yersin. Renamed Docteur Yersin in 1948. Whilst assisting a Chinese Nationalist Navy sloop, she was rammed and nearly sunk south of Hong Kong on 27 October 1949. Ran aground near Đồng Hới, Vietnam on 14 May 1953. Declared a total loss.

=== Kildonan Park ===
Kildonan Park was built by United Shipyards Ltd. She was completed on 30 September 1943. Built for Park Steamship Co., Montreal, she was operated under the management of McLean, Kennedy Ltd. Sold in 1946 to Acadia Overseas Freighters Ltd., Halifax and renamed Inverness County. Operated under the management of I. H. Mathers & Son. Sold in 1954 to San Felicia Compania Navigatio SA., Panama and rehamed Cassian. Operated under the management of Marcou & Sons (Shipbrokers) Ltd. Scrapped at Yokosuka, Japan in 1967.

=== Kitsilano Park ===
Kitsilano Park was built by North Vancouver Ship Repairs Ltd. Launched as Fort Sandusky, she was completed as Kitsilano Park on 31 December 1943. Built for Park Steamship Co., Montreal, she was placed under the management of Empire Shipping Co. Sold in 1946 to Western Canada Steamships Co., Vancouver and renamed Lake Kootenay. Sold in 1949 to Compania Maritima Samsoc Ltda., Panama and renamed Phopho. Sold in 1950 to Kaiser Gypsum Co., Redwood City, California, United States and renamed Harry Lundeberg.> Wrecked off Cape San Lucas, Mexico (22°52′N 109°53′W) on 8 February 1954. Declared a constructive total loss.

=== Kootenay Park (I) ===
Kootenay Park was built by West Coast Shipbuilders Ltd. She was launched at Fort Carlton and completed as Kootenay Park on 17 August 1942. Built for Park Steamship Co., she was placed under the management of Canadian-Australasian Line. To MoWT in 1944 and renamed Fort Nisqually. Operated under the management of McCowan & Gross. To MoT in 1946 and placed under the management of Goulandris Bros. Struck a mine and was damaged in the North Sea 72 nautical miles (133 km) north of Terschelling, Netherlands on 10 April 1950. Sold in 1950 to Kingsport Shipping Ltd., London and renamed Kingsmount. Sold in 1957 to Monteplata Compania Navigation, Monrovia and renamed Monteplata. Sold in 1960 To Atlantic Finance Corp., Monrovia and renamed Ekali. Sold in 1962 to The Santorini Shipping Co., Beirut, Lebanon and renamed Ioannis Nomikos. Sold in 1963 to Compania Naviera San Giovanni, Monrovia. Operated under the management of Nomikos. Scrapped at Alexandria, Egypt in 1974.

=== Kootenay Park (II) ===
Kootenay Park was built by Burrard Dry Dock Co. Ltd. Launched as Mohawk Park, she was completed as Kootenay Park on 26 September 1944. Built for Park Steamship Co., Montreal, she was operated under the management of Canadian - Australasian Line. Sold in 1947 to Kerr Silver Lines Ltd., Vancouver and renamed Manx Sailor. Sold in 1948 to Skibselskab A/S Malmtransport, Oslo, Norway and renamed Vistafjord. Operated under the management of Norwegian America Line Ltd. Sold in 1955 to Mariano Maresca & Co., Genoa and renamed Mar Cheto. Sold in 1963 to Fort Steamship Co, Panama and renamed Daring. Operated under the management of Maresco & Co. Scrapped at La Spezia in 1966.

=== Kootenay Park (III) ===
Kootenay Park was built by Burrard Dry Dock Co. Ltd. Launched as Mohawk Park, she was completed as Kootenay Park on 6 October 1944. Built for Park Steamship Co., Montreal, she was operated under the management of Canadian - Australasian Line. Sold in 1946 to Seaboard Shipping Ltd., Vancouver and renmamed Seaboard Pioneer. Sold in 1960 to Compania Mar del Este, Panama and renamed Pioneer. Operated under the management of Goulandris Bros. (Hellas) Ltd. Sold in 1964 to Avlis Shipping Co. Special S.A., Piraeus and renamed Atromitos. Sold in 1968 to Republica da Cuba - Empresa Navigacion Mambisa, Havana, Cuba and renamed Maximo Gomez. Withdrawn from service in 1978.

== L— Park ==
=== Lafontaine Park ===
Lafontaine Park was built by United Shipyards Ltd. She was completed on 30 August 1943. Built for Park Steamship Co., Montreal, she was operated under the management of McLean, Kennedy Ltd. Transferred to MoT in 1946. Operated under the management of Lambert Bros. Ltd. Was to have been renamed Hazel Hill in 1950. Sold in 1951 to Fairview Overseas Freighters Ltd and renamed Peterstar. Ran aground on the Pratas Reef, in the South China Sea on 4 July 1951 and was holed. Boarded by pirates, who departed when HMS Comus went to her assistance. Sold in 1957 to Modern Shipping Co., Monrovia and renamed Aspis. Sold in 1957 to Prosperity Steamship Corp, Monrovia and renamed Prosperity. Operated under the management of Vlassopoulo Bros. Ltd. Reflagged to Greece in 1959 and renamed Polyniki. Sold in 1965 to Ivory Shipping Co., Monrovia and renamed Ivory Neptune. Sold in 1967 to Marmando Compania Navigation, Panama. Sold in 1968 to Société de Transport Oriental S.A.L., Beirut. Scrapped at Shanghai in 1971.

=== Lakeside Park ===
Lakeside Park was built by Victoria Machinery Depot Co. Ltd. She was completed on 15 April 1945. Built for Park Steamship Co., Montreal, she was operated under the management of Canadian Pacific Steamships Ltd. Sold in 1946 to Andros Shipping Co., Montreal and renamed Lakeside. Sold in 1952 to Comarc Compania Navihgation SA., Panama and renamed Evgenia MG. Operated under the management of Goulandris Bros. Sold later that year to Compania Nationale Maritima Dora SA., Panama and renamed Theodora. Ran aground on the Bural Reef, in the Arabian Sea (22°30′N 69°15′E) on 25 August 1958. Refloated, but broke in two on 10 September. Arrived at Okha Port, India on 14 September. Declared a constructive total loss and sold for breakinbg.

=== Lakeview Park ===
Lakeview Park was built by Marine Industries Ltd. She was completed on 31 October 1944. Built for Park Steamship Co., Montreal, she was operated under the management of Furness Withy Ltd. Sold in 1946 to Acadid Overseast Freighters Ltd and renamed Halifax County. Operated under the management of I. H. Mathers & Son Ltd. Sold in 1949 to Society Transoceanica Canopus SA., Panama and renamed Canopus. Reflagged to Greece in 1960. Sold later that year to Venturer Shipping Co., Panama and renamed Ventura Feliz. Sold in 1963 to The Dynasty Shipping Co., Panama. Scrapped at Onomichi in 1967.

=== Lansdowne Park ===
Lansdowne Park was built by Davie Shipbuilding & Repairing Co. Ltd. She was completed on 15 April 1943. Built for Park Steamship Co., Montreal,. but subsequently transferred to MoWT. Sold in 1947 to Federal Commerce & Navigation Co. Ltd and renamed Federal Trader. Sold in 1951 to Provincial Steamships Ltd., St. John's, Newfoundland and renamed Provincial Trader. Sold in 1951 to Allied Steamship Lines Ltd, Montreal and renamed Gander Bay. Operated under the management of Montreal Shipping Co. Ltd. Sold in 1953 to Montrose Shipping Co., Montreal. Sold in 1955 to Corteleones Compania Navigation, Panama and renamed Atlawill. Sold in 1958 to Plymouth Navigation Co., Monrovia and renamed Caribbean Trader. Ran aground on the Alacran Reef, 68 nautical miles (126 km) north of Progreso, Mexico on 6 July 1963. Declared a total loss.

=== La Salle Park ===
La Salle Park was built by United Shipyards Ltd. She was launched as Fort Niagara and completed as La Salle Park on 21 April 944. Built for Park Steamship Co., Montreal, she was placed under the management of Cunard White Star Ltd. Sold in 1946 to Triton Steamship Co., Montreal and renamed Triland. Reflagged to the United Kingdom in 1951. Ran out of fuel in the Atlantic Ocean 400 nautical miles (740 km) off Halifax in March 1954. Taken in tow by the tug Foundation Frances. Sold in 1957 to Bahia Salinas Compania Navigation, Monrovia and renamed Manhattan. Operated under the management of Goulandris Bros. Ltd. Sold in 1964 to Federal Navigation Co., Monrovia and renamed Eastern Skipper. Operated under the management of First Steamship Co. Ltd. Scrapped at Kaohsiung in 1968.

=== Laurentide Park ===
Laurentide Park was built by Marine Industries Ltd. She was completed on 11 November 1942. Built for Park Steamship Co., Montreal. She was operated under the management of McLean, Kennedy Ltd. Sold in 1950 to Laurentide Steamship Co. Ltd., Montreal and renamed Winter Hill. Operated under the management of Nordic Ship Management Co. Ltd. Management later transferred to Counties Ship Management Co. Ltd. Sold in 1956 to Papachristidis Company Ltd., Montreal and renamed Petite Hermine. Sold in 1960 to Canuck Lines, Montreal and renamed Canuck Port. Operated under the management of Papachristidis Company Ltd. Sold in 1961 to A. Frangistas & S. Manessis, Piraeus and renamed Pantanassa. Scrapped in Tsingtao, China in 1967.

=== Leaside Park ===
Leaside Park was built by North Vancouver Ship Repairs Ltd. She was completed on 25 January 1944. Built for Park Steamship Co., Montreal, she was operated under the management of Canadian Shipping Co. Sold in 1946 to Western Canada Steamships Ltd., Vancouver and renamed Lake Lilooet. Sold in 1948 to Compania Navigation Oceanica SA., Panama and renamed Cnosaga. Sold in 1954 to Oroya Compania Navigation, Monrovia. Sold in 1964 to Transatlantic Marine Transport Co., Monrovia. Sold in 1966 to Alpha Transport Corp., Monrovia and renamed Coral. Scrapped in Kaohsiung in 1968.

=== Liscombe Park ===
Liscombe Park was built by Foundation Maritime Ltd. She was completed on 26 September 1944. Built for Park Steamship Co., Montreal, she was operated under the management of Canadian Shipping Co. Ltd. Sold in 1946 to Seagull Steamship Co. of Canada and renamed Saint Malo. Operated under the management of Papachristidis Company. Sold in 1951 to Panama Shipping Co. Inc., Panama and renamed Tapajos. Operated under the management of Booth American Shipping Corp. Sold in 1955 to A/S Auctor, Bergen, Norway and renamed Ørland. Sold in 1956 to A/S Auctor & John Grans Rederi, Bergen. Sold in 1964 to Fortidudo Lines Steamship, Monrovia and renamed Sagitta. Sold in 1967 to Compania de Navigation Pintamar, Monrovia and renamed Sfinge. Sold in 1969 to Compania Naviera General, Mogadishu and renamed Sirio. Renamed Suerte in 1970. Scrapped at Trieste, Italy in 1972.

=== Lorne Park ===
Lorne Park was built by Foundation Maritime Ltd. She was completed on 5 July 1945. Built for Park Steamship Co., Montreal, she was operated under the management of Canadian National Steamships Ltd. Sold in 1947 to Canadian Leader Ltd., Montreal and renamed Canadian Leader. Laid up at Halifax in 1957. Reported sold in 1958 to Banco Cubano del Comercio Exterior, Havana. Sold in 1960 to Oficina de Fomento Maritimo Cubano, Havana. Although Hales states the sale to Cuba was not gone ahead with. Scrapped at Avilés, Spain in January 1965.

=== Louisbourg Park ===
Louisbourg Park was built byy Burrard Dry Dock Co. Ltd. She was completed on 10 February 1944. Built for Park Steamship Co., Montreal, she was operated under the management of Canadian Transport Co. Sold to her managersnin 1946 and renamed Harmac Chermainus. Sold in 1949 to Eastern Shipping Corp., Bombay and renamed Bombay. Operated under the management of Scindia Steam Navigation Co. Ltd. Renamed Star of Saurashtra in 1954. Scrapped at Bombay in 1960.

== M— Park ==
=== Maissoneuve Park ===
Maissoneuve Park was built by Morton Engineering & Drydock Co. Ltd. She was completed on 26 September 1945. Built for Park Steamship Co., Montreal, she was operated under the management of Canadian National Steamships Ltd. Sold to her managers in 1947 and renamedc Canadian Highlander. Laid up at Halifax on 23 November 1957. Reported sold in 1958 to Banco Cubano del Comercio Exterior, Havana. Sold in 1960 to Oficina de Fomento Maritimo Cubano, Havana. Although Hales states the sale to Cuba was not gone ahead with. Scrapped at Bilbao in 1967.

=== Manitou Park ===
Manitou Park was built by Foundation Maritime Ltd. She was completed on 21 October 1943. Built for Park Steamship Co., Montreal, but subsequently transferred to MoWT. Sold in 1946 to Central Supply Co. of Indo-China and renamed Albert Calmette. Renamed Docteur A. Calmette in 1948 and placed under the management of Messageries Maritimes. Sold in 1950 to Denis Frères d'Indochine SA., Saigon and renamed Darlac. Sold in 1955 to Hong Kong Navigation & Investment Co. and renamed Hong Kong Trader. Sold in 1958 to Great Southern Steamship Co., Hong Kong and renamed Batu Pahat. Sold in 1962 to Malaya Shipping Co., Hong Kong, then sold later that year to Concordia Kinabatangan Shipping, Panama and renamed Sandakan Bay. Renamed Luen Tung in 1965. Sold in 1969 to Tung Lee Navigation Co., Kaohsiung and renamed Yue San. Scrapped at Kaohsiung in 1971.

=== Mayfair Park ===
Mayfair Park was built by Davie Shipbuilding & Repairing Co. Ltd. She was launched as Camp Valcartier and completed as Mayfair Park on 14 June 1943. Her intended charter to the MoWT was not proceeded with and she was transferred to the Park Steamship Co., Montreal. Sold in 1945 to Compania Siderurgica Nacional, Rio de Janeiro and renamed Siderurgica Quatro. Sold in 1968 to H. Dantas Comercio Navigacão y Industrias, Rio de Janeiro and renamed Atlantico. Scrapped in Brazil in 1972.

=== Mewata Park ===
Mewata Park was built by Burrard Dry Dock Co. Ltd. She was completed on 2 February 1944. Built for Park Steamship Co., Montreal, she was operated under the management of Canadian Transport Co. Sold to her managers in 1947 and renamed Harmac Crofton. Sold in 1949 to Eastern Shipping Corp., Bombay and renamed West Bengal. Renamed Star of West Bengal in 1954. Scrapped in Bombay, or Pakistan in 1960.

=== Millican Park ===
Millican Park was a Victory tanker built by Marine Industries Ltd. She was completed on 26 May 1944. Built for Park Steamship Co., Montreal, she was operated by Imperial Oil Co. Sold in 1945 to Branch Lines Ltd, Montreal and renamed Firbranch. Operated under the management of Joseph Simard Group. Scrapped at Sorel in 1970.

=== Mission Park ===
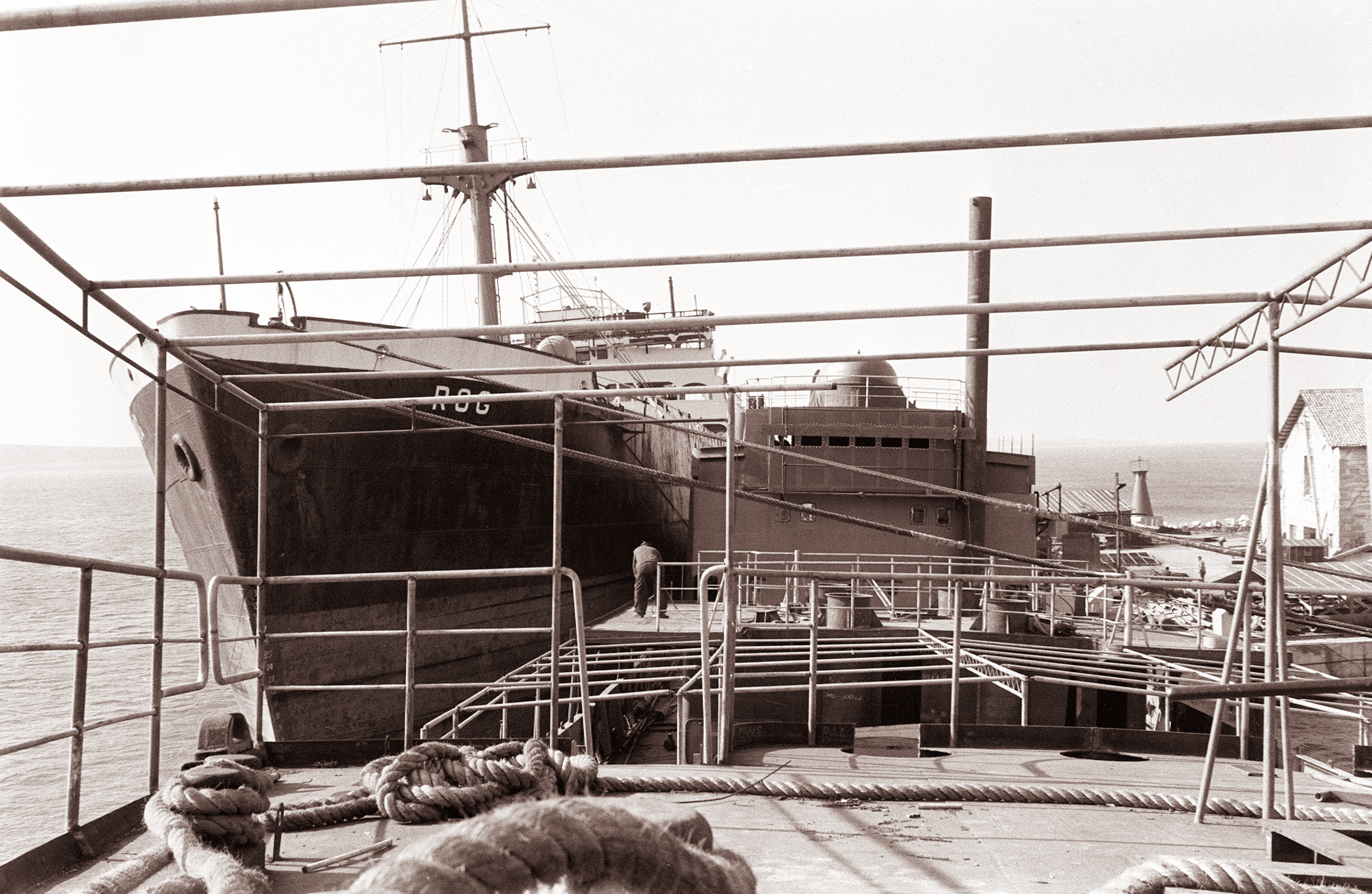
Rog

Mission Park was built by Victoria Machinery Co. Ltd. She was launched as Fort Berens and completed as Mission Park on 20 October 1944. Built for Park Steamship Co., she was placed under the management of Canadian Transport Co. Sold in 1947 to Australia, New Zealand Line, Montreal and renamed Ottawa Valley. Placed under the management of Trinder, Anderson & Co in 1950. Sold in 1954 to Splosna Plovba, Koper, Yugoslavia and renamed Rog. Sold in 1966 to William Brandts (Leasing) Ltd., Hong Kong and renamed Millstrident. Scrapped at Kaohsiung in 1969.

=== Mohawk Park (I) ===
Mohawk Park was built by Burrard Dry Dock Co. Ltd. Launched as Fort Norway, she was completed as Mohawk Park on 24 June 1943. Built for Park Steamship Co., Montreal. To MoWT in 1944 and renamed Fort Spokane. Operated under the management of Watts, Watts & Co. To MoT in 1946, management transferred to Cunard White Star Line. Sold in 1951 to Buries, Markes Ltd., London and renamed La Orilla. Sold in 1952 to Fratelli d'Amico, Rome and renamed Ariella. Scrapped at Trieste in 1965.

=== Mohawk Park (II) ===
See Kootenay Park (II)

=== Mohawk Park (III) ===
See Kootenay Park (III)

=== Montebello Park (I) ===
Montebello Park was built by West Coast Shipbuilders Ltd. She was completed on 31 January 1945. Built for Park Steamship Co., Montreal, she was operated under the management of Cunard White Star Ltd. Sold in 1946 to Dingwall Shipping Co. Ltd, Halifax and renamed Walton. Operated under the management of Quebec Steamship Lines. Sold in 1955 to Sicilarma Società di Navigazione per Azioni, Palermo and renamed Aci. Scrapped at Vado Ligure, Italy in 1966.

=== Montebello Park (II) ===
Montebello Park was a Victory ship built by Victoria Machinery Depot. She was launched as Montebello Park and completed as Fort Langley on 18 May 1945. Built for the MoWT, she was placed under the management of A. Holt & Co. Ltd. To MoT in 1946, operated under the management of George Nisbet & Co. To Admiralty in 1950. To Royal Fleet Auxiliary in 1954. Scrapped at Bilbao in 1970.

=== Montmorency Park ===
Montmorency Park was built by Foundation Maritime Ltd. She launched as Camp Petawawa and was completed as Montmorency Park on 11 August 1943. Built for MOWT, but transferred to Park Steamship Co., Montreal Sold in 1946 to Centre d'Approvisionnement de l'Indo-Chine, Saigon and renamed August Pavic. Operated under the management of Messageries Maritimes. Sold in 1948 to Sociètè les Affreteurs Maritimes Indochine, Saigon and renamed Docteur Angier. Driven ashore on Yoroshima, Japan (27°02′N 128°28′E) on 26 October 1949. Declared a total loss.

=== Moose Mountain Park ===
Moose Mountain Park was a Victory tanker built by West Coast Shipbuilders Ltd. She was completed on 1 February 1944. Built for Park Steamship Co., Montreal, she was operated under the management of Shell Canadian Tankers Ltd. Sold in 1946 to Skibselkab A/S Excelsior, Kristiansand and renamed Benoil. Sold in 1951 to Balearic Compania Navigation, Panama and renamed Conqueror. Converted to cargo ship in 1953. Driven ashore on Santa Rosa Island, California, United States on 20 June 1954. Declared a constructive total loss, but salvaged. Sold to Houston Investment Inc, Panama and renamed Running Eagle. Sold in 1955 to Compania de Navigation San Augustin, Panama and renamed Patapsco River. Scrapped at Hirao in 1963.

=== Mount Bruce Park ===
Mount Bruce Park was a Victory tanker built by West Coast Shipbuilders Ltd. She was completed on 2 December 1943. Built for Park Steamship Co., Montreal, she was operated under the management of Shell Canadian Tankers Ltd. To French Government in 1946 and renamed Port Jerome. Sold later that year to Skibselskab A/S Mosvold Shipping Co., Farsund, Norway and renamed Mosna. Converted to cargo ship in 1954. Sold that year to INSA Società di Navigazione, Genoa and renamed Arlesiana. Scrapped at La Spezia in 1963.

=== Mount Douglas Park ===
Mount Douglas Park was built by West Coast Shipbuilders Ltd. Launched at Fort Green Lake, she was completed as Mount Douglas Park on 15 June 1943. Built for Park Steamship Co., Montreal, she was placed under the management of Canadian Transport Co. To MoT in 1946. Operated under the management of Hall Bros. Wrecked on the Preparis Shoal, Indian Ocean (14°48′N 93°43′E) on 19 August 1946.

=== Mount Maxwell Park ===
Mount Maxwell Park was a Victory tanker built by Victoria Machinery Depot Co. Ltd. She was completed on 1 April 1944. Built for Park Steamship Co., Montreal, she was operated under the management of Shell Canadian Tankers Ltd. Sold in 1946 to Familoil Steamship Co. Montreal and renamed Mount Maxwll. Converted to a cargo ship in 1949. Sold that year to Alba Steamship Co. Ltd, Panama and renamed Buccaneer. Operated under the management of S. G. Embiricos Ltd. Sold in 1959 to Plate Shipping Co., Piraeus and renamed Plate Mariner. Sold in 1964 to Union Shipping Corp., Monrovia and renamed Beatrice. Scrapped at Kaohsiung in 1963.

=== Mount Orford Park ===
Mount Orford Park was built by United Shipyards Ltd. She was completed on 22 June 1944. Built for Park Steamship Co., Montreal, she was operated under the management of Constantine Lines (Canada) Ltd. to MoT in 1946. Operated under the management of Woodham Steamship Co. Sold in 1950 to Orford Steamship Co. Ltd., London and renamed Orford. Operated under the management of George Nicolaou. Sold in 1956 to Oceanica SA., Monrovia and renamed Cape Rion. Reflagged to Greece in 1960. Sold in 1964 to Philippine Merchants Steamship Co., Manila, Philippines and renamed Visayan Merchant. Sold later that year to Alianza Oceanica Armadora, Panama and renamed Mary M. Sold in 1967 to Loyal Navigation Co., Panama and renamed Loyal Garlands. Sold in 1968 to China Marine Investment Co., Keelung. Scrapped at Kaohsiung in 1970.

=== Mount Revelstoke Park ===
Mount Revelstoke Park was built by Marine Industries Ltd. She was completed on 31 July 1943. Built for Park Steamship Co., Montreal, she was operated under the management of McLean, Kennedy Ltd. To MoT in 1946 Operated under the management of The Aviation & Shipping Co. Sold in 1948 to Laurentian Marine Co. Ltd., Montreal and renamed Laurentian Forest. Operated under the management of Coulouthros Ltd. Sold in 1957 to Corona Compania Navigation SA., Panama and renamed Aegean Wave. Sold in 1959 to Insular Trading Corp., Monrovia and renamed Aegean Zephyr. Sold in 1962 to Southern Industrial Projects, Manila and renamed Southern Star. Sold in 1964 to Philippine Merchants Steamship Co., Manila and renamed Luzon Merchant. Sold in 1965 to Amfithia Shipping Co., Famagusta, Cyprus and renamed Amfiali. Operated under the management of J. Livanos. Sold later that year to Tramping & Freighting Concern Ltd., Famagusta, remaining under the same management. Scrapped at Singapore in 1967.

=== Mount Robson Park (I) ===
Mount Robson Park was built by North Vancouver Ship Repairs Ltd. Launched as Fort Rouge, she was completed as Mount Robson Park on 27 August 1942. Built for Park Steamship Co., Montreal, she was placed under the management of Canadian Australasian Line. To MoWT and renamed Fort Miami in September 1944. Operated under the management of Evan Thomas, Radcliffe & Co. Management changed to Cunard Whit Star Line in 1946 and then to George Nisbet & Co. in 1950. Sold later that year to Rex Shipping Co. and renamed Midhurst. Operated under the management of I. H. Mathers & Son. Management later transferred to Hadjilias & Co. Sold in 1957 to Asturias Shipping Co., Monrovia and renamed Andalusia, remaining under the management of Hadjilias. Reflagged to Greece in 1961. Sold in 1964 to Compania de Navigation Phoenix, Panama and renamed Sevilla. Scrapped at Keelung in 1967.

=== Mount Robson Park (II) ===
Mount Robson Park was built by West Coast Shipbuilders Ltd. Launched as Fort Miami, she was completed as Mount Robson Park on 7 September 1944. Built for Park Steamship Co., Montreal, she was placed under the management of Canadian Australasian Line. Sold in 1946 to Western Canada Steamships Ltd., Vancouver and renamed Lake Manitou. Sold in 1951 to Andros Shipping Ltd, Montreal and renamed Cliffside. Operated under the management of Goulandris Bros. Sold in 1952 to Alianza Compania Armadora, Monrovia and renamed Niki. Sold in 1953 to Star Steamship Corp., Monrovia and renamed Star. Sold in 1961 to West Africa Oil Carriers Corp., Monrovia and renamed Nalon. Scrapped at Kaohsiung in 1967.

=== Mount Royal Park ===
Mount Royal Park was a Victory tanker built by Victoria Machinery Depot Co. Ltd. She was completed on 29 September 1943. Built for Park Steamship Co., Montreal, she was operated under the management of Imperial Oil Ltd. Sold in 1946 to H. E. Hansen - Tangen, Kristiansand and renamed Adna. Converted to cargo ship in 1954. Sold that year to Sterling Shipping Corp., London and renamed Sterling Viking. Sold in 1956 to Alcyone Shipping Co. Ltd., London and renamed Alcyone Might. Operated under the management of Adelphi Vergottis Ltd. Sold in 1957 to Jugoslavenska Oceanska Plovidba, Kotor, Yugoslavia and renamed Orjen. Sold in 1968 to Embajada Compania Navigation, Mogadishu and renamed Beryl. Scrapped at Kaohsiung in 1968.

=== Mulgrave Park ===
Mulgrave Park was built by Foundation Maritime Ltd. She was completed on 17 April 1945. Built for Park Steamship Co., Montreal, she was operated under the management of H. E. Kane & Co. Sold to China in 1946 and renamed Dun Yu. Sold later that year to China Merchants Steam Navigation Co., Shanghai. Sold in 1951 to China People's Steam Navigation Co., Guangzhou. Renamed Nan Hai 157 later that year. Renamed Hong Qi 157 in 1967. Reported condemned in 1983 and presumed to have been scrapped.

== N— Park ==
=== Nemiskan Park ===
Nemiskan Park was built by Prince Rupert Drydock & Shipyard. She was completed on 30 July 1943. Built for Park Steamship Co., Montreal, she was operated under the management of Empire Shipping Co. to MoT in 1946, operated under the management of Tavistock Shipping Co. Management transferred to Mungo, Campbell & Co. in 1950. Sold in 1951 to Armdale Overseas Freighters Ltd., Halifax and renamed Darton. Operated under the management of C. M. Los Ltd. Ran aground off Gedser, Denmark on 9 December 1955, but was refloated. Sold in 1956 to Canadian Hellenic Enterprises Ltd., London. Sold in 1957 to Federal Commerce & Navigation Co. Ltd., Montreal and renamed Federal Commerce. Operated under the management of Watts, Watts & Co. Sold in 1959 to Arbella SA., Monrovia and renamed Brasilia. Sold later that year to Northern Shipping Co., Monrovia and renamed Northern Star, the sold to Montego Steamship Corp., Monrovia and renamed Montego Star. Sold in 1960 to Pacific Bulk Carrier Inc. Monrovia and renamed Pacific Traveller. Operated under the management of C. Y. Tung. Sold in 1961 to Universal Marine Corp., Monrovia and renamed Oceanic Express, Scrapped at Iwate, or Hikaro, Japan in 1966.

=== Nipiwan Park ===
Nipiwan Park was a Victory tanker built by Collingwood Shipyards Ltd., Collingwood, Ontario. She was completed on 28 November 1942. Built for Park Steamship Co., Montreal, she was operated under the management of Imperial Oil Co. Torpedoed and damaged in the Atlantic Ocean (44°20′N 63°00′W by U1232 on 4 January 1945. Broke in two; the bow section sank. Stern section salvaged. Taken to Pictou, where a new bow section was built. Sold in 1946 to Kent Line Ltd., Saint John. New engine fitted in 1949. Sold that year to Nipiwan Park Ltd., Nassau, Bahamas. Operated under the management of K. C. Irving. Sold in 1951 to Kent Line Ltd. Renamed Irvinglake in 1952. Sold in 1961 to Irvinglake Steamships Ltd., Saint John. Converted to a barge in 1962. Ran aground at Bathurst, New Brunswick in November 1963.

=== Noranda Park ===
Noranda Park was built by United Shipyards Ltd. She was completed on 15 September 1944. Built for Park Steamship Co., Montreal, she was operated under the management of Cunard White Star Line. Sold in 1946 to Andros Shipping Co., Montreal and renamed Oceanside. Sold in 1952 to Broad Steamship Corp., Monrovia and renamed Magdalene. Operated under the management of Union Maritime & Shipping Co. Ltd. sold in 1967 to Oceanica Transports Co., Piraeus and renamed Kirman Scrapped at Karachi in 1969.

=== Norwood Park ===
Norwood Park was a Victory tanker built by Collingwood Shipyards Ltd. She was completed on 28 November 1943. Built for Park Steamship Co., Montreal, she was operated under the management of Imperial Oil Co. Sold in 1945 to Branch Lines Ltd., Montreal and renamed Elmbranch. Rebuilt in 1960, now 3,367 GRT. Sold in 1980 to Witbulk corp., Panama and renamed Witsupply II. Ran aground off Sint Maarten in September 1989. Refloated then scuttled.

== O— Park ==
=== Oakmount Park ===
Oakmount Park was built by St. John Drydock & Shipbuilding Co. Ltd. She was completed on 30 December 1944. Built for Park Steamship Co., Montreal, she was operated under the management of Pickford & Black Ltd. Sold in 1945 to Atlantic Shipping Agencies Ltd., Montreal and renamed Oakmount. Sold in 1948 to Compania Maritime Panamena SA., Panama and renamed Makena II. Sold in 1951 to Silvertown Services Ltd, London and renamed Sugar Producer. Operated under the management of R. S. Dalgleish Ltd. Sold in 1953 to Shamrock Shipping Co., London and renamed Curran. Sold in 1957 to K/S Ocean Fortune, Bergen and renamed Ocean Fortune. Operated under the management of Bergens Kulkompani A/S. Sold in 1960 to Indonesian Fortune Line, Jakarta, Indonesia. Renamed Onbak Fadjar in 1968. Existence in doubt in 1983, fate unknown.

=== Otterburn Park ===
Otterburn Park was a Victory tanker built by Marine Industries Ltd. She was completed on 25 May 1944. She was built for Park Steamship Co., Montreal. Sold in 1946 to Branch Lines Ltd., Montreal and renamed Sprucebranch. Operated under the management of Joseph Simard Group. Rebuilt in 1960, now 3,345 GRT. Scrapped at Vigo, Spain in 1974.

=== Outremont Park ===
Outremont Park was built by United Shipyards Ltd. She was completed on 28 September 1944. Built for Park Steamship Co., Montreal, she was operated under the management of McLean, Kennedy Ltd. Sold in 1946 to Furness (Canada) Ltd., London and renamed Brazilian Prince. Operated under the management of Prince Line Ltd. Sold in 1958 to Federal Commerce & Navigation Co. Ltd., Montreal and renamed Federal Pioneer. Scrapped in China in 1971.

== P— Park ==
=== Parkdale Park ===
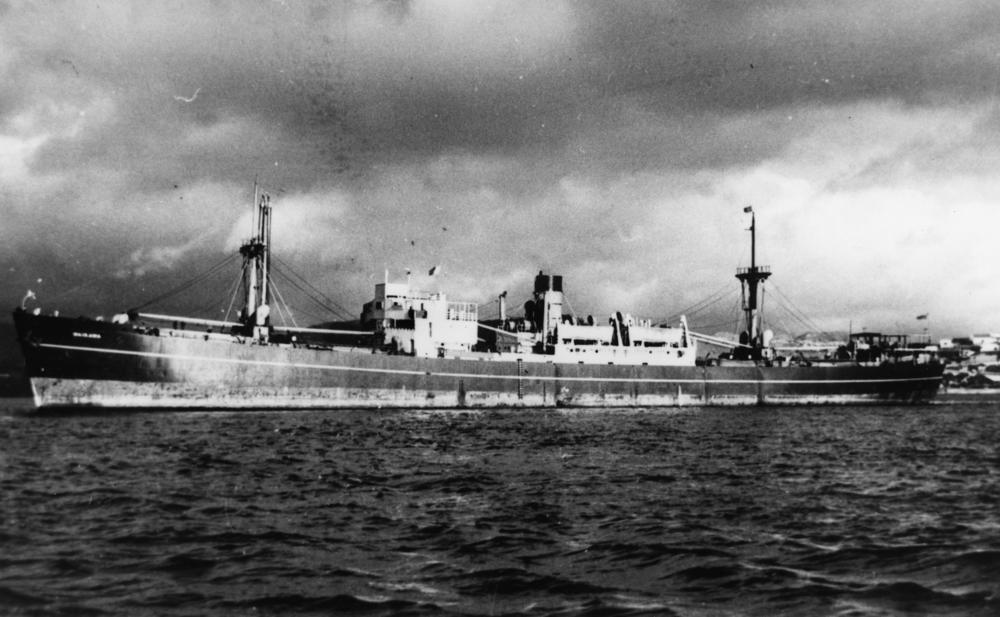
Waikawa

Parkdale Park was built by West Coast Shipbuilders Ltd. She was completed on 11 May 1944. Built for Park Steamship Co., Montreal, she was operated under the management of Canadian Australasian Line. Sold in 1946 to Canadian Union Line Ltd., Vancouver and renamed Waikawa. Remained under the same managers. Sold in 1959 to Marine Development & Supply S.A., Panama and renamed Fulda. Scrapped at Kaohsiung in 1969.

=== Point Pelee Park ===
Point Pelee Park was a tanker built by Canadian Vickers Ltd., Montreal. Launched as Fort Chimo, she was completed as Point Pelee Park on 18 August 1942. Built for Park Steamship Co., she was placed under the management of Imperial Oil Ltd., Toronto. Sold in 1946 to Erling Hansen Rederi A/S, Kristiansand, Norway and renamed Ranella. Sold in 1954 to International Navigation Corp., Panama. Converted to a cargo ship and renamed Hudson River. Sold in 1960 to United Navigation Corp., Panama and renamed Formosan Star. Sold in 1961 to Taiwan Maritime Transportation Co., Keelung, Taiwan and renamed Tai Shing. Scrapped at Keelung, or Ghent, Belgium in 1964.

=== Point Pleasant Park ===
Point Pleasant Park was built by David Shipbuilding & Repairing Co. Ltd. She was completed on 8 November 1943. Built for Park Steamship Co., Montreal, she was operated under the management of Furness, Withy & Co. Torpedoed, shelled and sunk in the Atlantic Ocean 29°42′S 9°58′E by U-510 on 23 February 1945.

=== Portland Park ===
Portland Park was built by United Shipyards Ltd. She was completed on 23 November 1944. Built for Park Steamship Co., Montreal, she was operated under the management of March Shipping Agency Ltd. Sold in 1946 to Canadian Shipowners Ltd and renamed Marchport; remaining under the same managers. Sold in 1949 to Montship Lines Ltd., Montreal and renamed Mont Clair. Operated under the management of Montreal Shipping Co. Ltd. Reflagged to the United Kingdom in 1952 and placed under the management of Buries Markes Ltd. Sold in 1954 to G. Gestone Esercizio Navigazione, Genoa and renamed Maria Piera Sold in 1960 to "La Carnogliese" S.p.A., Genoa and renamed Vittorio Veneto. Scrapped at La Spezia in 1969.

=== Port Royal Park ===
Port Royal Park was built by Marine Industries Ltd. She was launched as Fort Frontenac and completed as Port Royal Park on 2 October 1942. Built for Park Steamship Co., Montreal, she was placed under the management of Elder Dempster Lines Ltd. To MoT in 1946, operated under the management of Tavistock Shipping Ltd. Sold in 1950 to Rex Shipping Co., London and renamed Fernhurst. Operated under the management of Hadjilias & Co. Sold in 1958 to Grenehurst Shipping Co., London and renamed Navarra. Sold in 1961 to Anthares Maritima S.A. de Navigacion, Buenos Aires, Argentina. Scrapped at Hendrik-Ido-Ambacht, Netherlands in 1963.

=== Prince Albert Park ===
Prince Albert Park was built by David Shipbuilding & Repairing Co. Ltd. She was launched as Fort la Prairie and completed as Prince Albert Park on 30 June 1942. Built for Park Steamship Co. Montreal, she was placed under the management of Elder Dempster Lines Ltd. To MoT in 1946. Operated under the management of Tavistock Shipping Ltd. Sold in 1951 to Champlain Freighters Ltd., London and renamed Champlain. Operated under the management of Hadoulis Ltd. Wrecked at Yulin, Hainan, China (18°17′N 109°33′E) in a typhoon on 26 June 1955. Not abandoned by her crew until August.

=== Princeton Park ===
Princeton Park was built by Burrard Dry Dock Co. Ltd. She was completed on 28 February 1945. Built for Park Steamship Co., Montreal, she was operated under the management of Canadian Shipping Co. Sold in 1946 to Western Canada Steamships Ltd., Vancouver and renamed Lake Minnewanka. Sold in 1954 to Compania Navigation Madraki S.A., Panama and renamed Santiago. Operated under the management of S. G. Embiricos Ltd. Renamed Madrakisame in 1960. Scrapped at Sakaide, Japan in 1969.

== Q— Park ==
=== Queens Park ===
Queens Park was built by West Coast Shipbuilders Ltd. She was completed on 2 June 1944. Built for Park Steamship Co., Montreal, she was operated under the management of Seaboard Shipping Co., Vancouver Sold in 1946 to her managers and renamed Seaboard Queen. Sold in 1950 to Compania Mar del Esgte SA., Panama and renamed Queen. Sold in 1954 to Society Armadora del Norte, Panama then sold later that year to Compania de Navigacion Conval, Panama. Reflagged to Greece in 1960 and renamed Nimos. Collided with another vessel on 14 January 1962 and sank near Constanţa on 14 January 1962. Refloated on 16 January. Sold in 1964 to Marconcepto Compania Navigation, Monrovia and renamed Mount Othrys. Ran aground near Okha Port on 11 June 1968. Scrapped in situ.

=== Queensborough Park ===
Fort Duquesne

Queensborough Park was built by West Coast Shipbuilders Ltd. Launched on 28 September 1944, she was completed on 25 November 1944. Built for the MoWT, she was placed under the management of George Nisbet & Co. Renamed Fort Duquesne in 1945. Management transferred to Alfred Holt & Co. in 1947. To Admiralty on 15 September 1947 and operated by the Royal Fleet Auxiliary. Scrapped at Temise, Belgium by Jos Boel et Fils in 1967.

=== Quetico Park ===
Quetico Park was a Victory tanker built by West Coast Shipbuilders Ltd. She was completed on 31 March 1944. Built for Park Steamship Co., Montreal, she was operated under the management of Imperial Oil Co. Sold in 1946 to Compagnie Maritimes de Transports de Goudron, Le Havre, France and renamed Donges. Sold in 1955 to Pandelis Shipping Corp., London. Sold later that year to St. Paul Shipping Corp., Monrovia. Renamed Azure Coast in 1956. Scrapped at Vigo in 1962.

== R— Park ==
=== Richmond Park ===
Richmond Park was built by North Vancouver Ship Repairs Ltd. She was completed on 18 August 1944. Built for Park Steamship Co., Montreal, she was operated under the management of Anglo-Canadian Shipping Co. Sold in 1946 to Western Canada Shipping Co. Ltd., Vancouver and renamed Lake Nipigon. Sold in 1949 to La Plata Compania de Vapores SA, Panama and renamed Pontoporos. Operated under the management of N. J. Pateras & Sons Ltd. Sold in 1953 to Pontoporos Shipping Corp., Monrovia. Sold in 1955 to Compania Nacional Naviera, Monrovia and renamed Maria II. Reflagged to Greece in 1960 and renamed Maria Lemnos. Sold in 1967 to Yabut Ocean Lines Ltd., Beirut and renamed Fabian Yabut. Scrapped in Kaohsiung in 1969.

=== Rideau Park ===
Rideau Park was built by United Shipyards Ltd. She was completed on 14 August 1943. Built for Park Steamship Co., Montreal, she was operated under the management of Furness, Withy Ltd. To MoT in 1946, placed under the management of Tavistock Shipping Co. Management transferred to W. A Souter & Co. in 1950. Sold later that year to Ottawa Steamship Co. Ltd., Halifax and renamed Amersham Hill. Operated under the management of Counties Ship Management Ltd. Management transferred to Coulouthros Ltd. in 1952. Sold in 1961 to Mareta Compania Navigation, Monrovia and renamed Petalon, remaining under the same management. Sold in 1965 to Danangel Compania Navigation, Monrovia and renamed Alcibades. Operated under the management of G. Daniolos. Scrapped in Shanghai in 1968.

=== Riding Mountain Park ===
Riding Mountain Park was a dredger built by Government Yard, Sorel in 1905. Launched as W. S. Fielding, she was built for the Canadian Government. Renamed P.W.D. No. 1 in 1914. Sold in 1943 to Park Steamship Co., Montreal and converted to a tanker. Renamed Riding Mountain Park. To MoWT in November 1944 and renamed Empire Pike. Operated under the management of Coastal Tankers Ltd. Sold in 1947 to Bulk Storage Co Ltd, London and renamed Basingford. To Basinghall Shipping Co. Scrapped in 1949 at Dunston on Tyne, United Kingdom.

=== Riverdale Park ===
Riverdale Park was built by Davie Shipbuilding & Repairing Co. Ltd. She was completed on 16 September 1943. Built for Park Steamship Co., Montreal, she was operated under the management of Furness, Withy & Co. Sold in 1946 to Triton Steamship Co. Ltd., London. and renamed Tridale. Operated under the management of March Shipping Agency Ltd. Sold in 1964 to Bahia Salinas Compania Navigation, Panama and renamed Harrier. Operated under the management of Goulandris Bros. Reflagged to Greece in 1960. Sold in 1964 to Steering Line, Monrovia and renamed Java Steer. Reflagged to Indonesia in 1967. Sold in 1968 to Sun Life Marine Industries, Panama and renamed Triumph. Scrapped later that year at Onomichi.

=== Riverview Park ===
Riverview Park was built by Davie Shipbuilding & Repairing Co. Ltd. She was completed on 13 May 1943. Built for Park Steamship Co., Montreal, she was operated under the management of Canadian Pacific Steamships Ltd. Sold in 1946 to Acadia Overseas Freighters Ltd., Halifax and renamed Shelburne County. Operated under the management of I. H. Mathers & Son Ltd. Sold in 1954 to Fortaleza Compania Navigation SA, Panama and renamed Lily. Reflagged to Greece in 1960. Sold later that year to West Africa Carriers Corp., Monrovia and renamed Ebro. Scrapped at Hong Kong in 1967.

=== Rockcliffe Park ===
Rockcliffe Park was built by Foundation Maritime Ltd. Launched as Camp Aldershot, she was completed as Rockcliffe Park on 8 July 1943. Built for Park Steamship Co., Montreal, she was operated under the management of Canadian National Steamships Ltd. Transferred to Newfoundland Government in 1946. To Canadian Ministry of Transport in 1947 and renamed Brigus. Operated under the management of Canadian National Steamships Ltd. Sold in 1955 to Carmelo Compania Navigation SA, Panama and renamed Olcat. Operated under the management of Andreadis (UK) Ltd. Sold in 1962 to R. Sen & Co., Calcutta and renamed Bay Bengal. Scrapped in Bombay in 1972.

=== Rockland Park ===
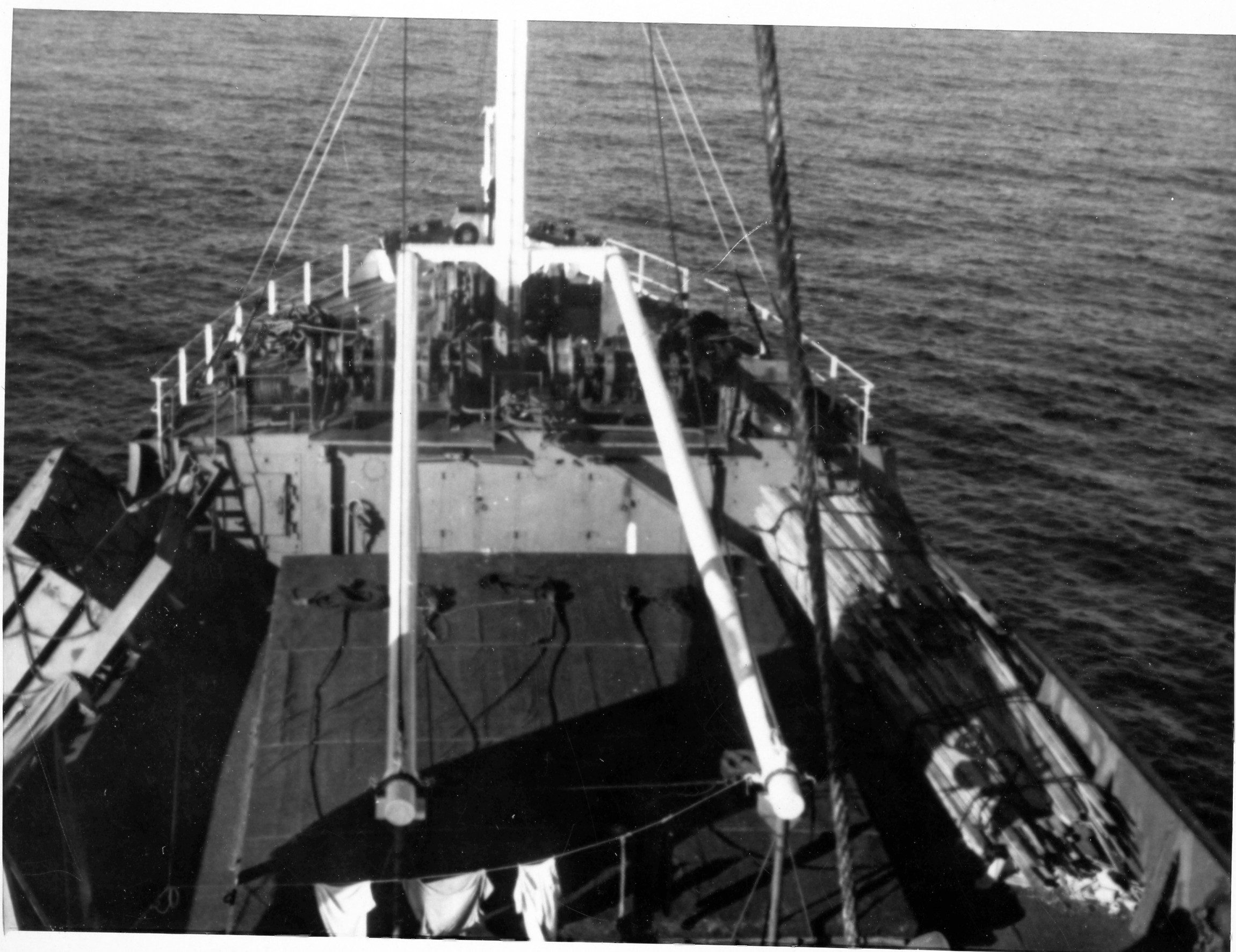
Bow of Rockland Park

Rockland Park was built by Morton Engineering & Drydock Co. Ltd. She was completed on 13 June 1945. Built for Park Steamship Co., Montreal, she was operated under the management of H. E. Kane & Co. Sold in 1946 to China Merchants Steam Navigation Co., Shanghai and renamed Lin Kuo. Reflagged to Taiwan in 1949. Renamed Kai Ling in 1961. Scrapped in Taiwan in 1965.

=== Rockwood Park ===
Rockwood Park was built by St. John Drydock & Shipbuilding Co. Ltd. She was completed on 15 February 1943. Built for Park Steamship Co., Montreal, she was operated under the management of H. E. Kane & Co. Sold in 1947 to Seagull Steamship Co. of Canada Ltd. and renamed La Grande Hermine. Sold in 1951 to Panama Shipping Co., Panama and renamed Vianna. Sold in 1955 to Armaments Leon Mazzella & Compagnie, Oran, Algeria and renamed Cap Falcon. Sold in 1962 to Emilio Parello, Naples, Italy and renamed Licola. Scrapped at La Spezia in 1971.

=== Rocky Mountains Park ===
Rocky Mountains Park was built by Marine Industries Ltd. She was completed on 24 August 1943. Built for Park Steamship Co., Montreal, she was operated under the management of Elder Dempster Lines Ltd. Sold in 1950 to Falaise Steamship Co. Ltd. and renamed Wynchwood Hill. Operated under the management of Counties Ship Management Co. Ltd. Scrapped at Nagasaki, Japan in 1959.

=== Rondeau Park ===
Rondeau Park was built by United Shipyards Ltd. She was completed on 27 April 1944. Built for the Park Steamship Co., Montreal, she was operated under the management of Montreal, Australia, New Zealand Line. Sold in 1950 to Halifax Overseas Freighters Ltd and renamed Sycamore Hill. Operated under the management of Counties Ship Management Co. Ltd. Sold in 1964 to Antarctic (Bermuda) Shipping Co., remaining under the same management. Ran aground at the southern entrance to the Bosphorus on 29 September 1964. She was refloated on 2 October. Scrapped at Hong Kong in 1966.

=== Rosedale Park ===
Rosedale Park was built by United Shipyards Ltd. She was completed on 25 May 1944. Built for Park Steamship Co., Montreal, she was operated under the management of Canadian Pacific Steamships Ltd. To MoT in 1946. Operated under the management of St. Quentin Shipping Co. Management transferred to William Brown, Atkinson & Co. in 1949. Sold in 1950 to Halifax Overseas Freighters Ltd and renamed Poplar Hill. Operated under the management of Counties Ship Management Co. Ltd. Sold in 1960 to Dah Lien Shipping Co., Hong Kong and renamed Shienfoon. Scrapped at Hong Kong in 1968.

=== Runnymede Park ===
Runnymede Park was built by United Shipyards Ltd. She was completed on 8 June 1944. Built for the Park Steamship Co., Montreal, she was operated under the management of Montreal, Australia, New Zealand Line. Sold in 1951 to Runnymede Steamship Co. Ltd., Montreal and renamed Lake Michigan. Operated under the management of Ships Finance & Management Co. Sold in 1957 to Marempressa Compania Navigation SA., Monrovia and renamed Karaostasi. Operated under the management of George Nicolaou Ltd. Sold in 1964 to Fraternity Marine Transport, Famagusta and renamed Adelphos Petrakis. Suffered an engine room fire in 1967 and consequently scrapped at Niihama, Japan.

=== Rupert Park ===
Rupert Park was built by Burrard Dry Dock Co. Ltd. She was completed on 9 May 1945. Built for the Park Steamship Co., Montreal, she was operated under the management of Empire Shipping Co. Sold in 1946 to Western Canada Steamships Ltd., Vancouver and renamed Lake Okanagan. Sold in 1949 to Compania Farallon de Navigation SA., Panama and renamed Nueva Gloria. Operated under the management of D. J. Fafalios. Reflagged to Greece in 1960. Sold that year to China and renamed Hoping 13. Renamed Zhan Dou 13 in 1967. Scrapped at Hong Kong in 1982.

== S— Park ==
=== Salt Lake Park ===
Salt Lake Park was built by Victoria Machinery Depot Co. Ltd. She was completed on 7 June 1944. Built for the Park Steamship Co., Montreal, she was operated under the management of Canadian Australasian Line. Sold to her managers in 1946 and renamed Wairuna. Sold to Canadian Union Line, Vancouver in 1947. Sold in 1960 to Marine Development & Supply S.A., Panama and renamed Bonna. Sold in 1965 to Hongfahlee Navigation Co., Panama. Scrapped at Kaohsiung in 1969.

=== Sapperton Park ===
Sapperton Park was built by Burrard Drydock Co. Ltd. Launched as Fort Toulouse, she was completed as Sapperton Park on 7 January 1944. Built for the Park Steamship Co., Montreal, she was operated under the management of Canadian Transport Co., Vancouver. Sold to her managers in 1946 and renamed Harmac Alberni. Sold in 1948 to Furness (Canada) Ltd., Montreal and renamed Royston Grange. operated under the management of Furness, Withy & Co. Ltd Sold in 1949 to Rio Pardo Compania Navigation, Panama and renamed Yiannis. Operated under the management of Goulandris Bros. (Hellas) Ltd. Sold in 1954 to Compania Prospero S.A., Panama. Scrapped at Mihara in 1967.

=== Seacliff Park ===
Seacliff Park was built by Burrard Drydock Co. Ltd. She was completed on 17 October 1944. Built for the Park Steamship Co., Montreal, she was operated under the management of Canadian Transport Co. Sold to her managers in 1946 and renamed Harmac Westminster. Sold in 1949 to Compania de Navigation Sappho SA., Panama and renamed Panaghia. Operated under the management of Constantine Hadjipateras & Sons. Sold in 1958 to Elcarriers Inc., Piraeus and renamed Bendita. Operated under the management of Liberia Seres Shipping Inc. Reflagged to Liberia in 1964. Scrapped at Hirao in 1966.

=== Selkirk Park ===
Selkirk Park was built by North Vancouver Ship Repairs Ltd. She was completed on 5 March 1945. Built for the Park Steamship Co., Montreal, she was operated under the management of Johnson Walton Steamships Ltd., Vancouver. Sold to her managers in 1946 and renamed Tahsis. Solod in 1950 to Compania Maritime Samsoc. Ltda., Panama and renamed Pelops. Sold in 1959 to Taiwan Navigation Co., Keelung and renamed Tainan. Scrapped in Taiwan in 1964.

=== Seven Oaks Park ===
Seven Oaks Park was built by Victoria Machinery Depot Co. Ltd. She was completed on 13 July 1945. Built for the Park Steamship Co., Montreal, she was operated under the management of Seaboard Shipping Co. Sold in 1946 to Andros Shipping Co. Ltd., Montreal and renamed Seaside. Sold in 1952 to Escobal Compania Navigation S.A., Monrovia and renamed Rubystar. Operated under the management of C. M. Lemnos & Co. Ltd. Driven against a pier and sank at Tabaco, Philippines during a typhoon on 26 June 1960. Partly refloated, but further damaged in another typhoon on 6 October and sank again. Refloated on 27 March 1961, but allowed to sink on account of an approaching typhoon.

=== Shakespeare Park ===
Shakespeare Park was built by Saint John Drydock & Shipbuilding Co. Ltd. She was completed on 14 November 1945. Built for the Park Steamship Co., Montreal, she was operated under the management of Saguenay Terminals Ltd., Montreal. Sold to her managers in 1948 and renamed Sunprince. Reflagged to the United Kingdom in 1954. Sold in 1959 to Stanhal Navigation Ltd., Monrovia and renamed Salammanna. Scrapped at Gijón, Spain in 1964.

=== Sibley Park ===
Sibley Park was built by United Shipyards Ltd. She was completed on 11 July 1944. Built for the Park Steamship Co., Montreal, she was operated under the management of Cunard White Star Ltd. To MoT in 1946, remaining under the same management. Sold in 1950 to Waverley Overseas Freighters Ltd., Halifax and renamed Kenilworth. Operated under the management of Falafios Ltd. Sold in 1956 to Compania Filiori de Navigation SA., Pahama and renamed Aeolos. Operated under the management of D. J. Falafios. Sold in 1961 to Speedwell Shipping Co., Beirut and renamed Atolos. Sold in 1964 to Prekookeanska Plovidba, Bar, Yugoslavia and renamed Mojkovac. Scrapped at Split in 1969.

=== Silver Star Park ===
Silver Star Park was a Victory tanker built by West Coast Shipbuilders Ltd. She was completed on 23 December 1943. Built for the Park Steamship Co., Montreal, she was operated under the management of Shell Canadian Tankers Ltd. Ran into by the American cargo ship Mangore at New York on 12 April 1945 and caught fire. Sold in a damaged condition and repaired. Sold later that year to Navebras, Rio de Janeiro and renamed Santa Cecilia. To Brazilian Navy in 1951 and renamed Ilha Grande. Sold in 1960 to Petroleo Brasiliero S.A., Rio de Janeiro. Ran aground on the Manoel Luiz Reef, in the Atlantic Ocean on 9 March 1962. Declared a total loss.

=== Simcoe Park ===
Simcoe Park was built by North Vancouver Ship Repairs Ltd. She was completed on 6 April 1945. Built for the Park Steamship Co., Montreal, she was operated under the management of Cunard White Star Ltd. Sold in 1948 to Saguenay Terminals Ltd., Montreal and renamed Sunmount. Reflagged to the United Kingdom in 1955. Sold in 1960 to Yick Fung Shipping & Enterprises Co., Hong Kong and renamed Shun Fung. Driven ashore in a typhoon at Hong Kong on 5 September 1964 and broke her back. Declared a total loss.

=== Springbank Park ===
Springbank Park was a tanker built by Collingwood Shipyards Ltd. She was completed on 29 September 1944. Built for the Park Steamship Co., Montreal, she was operated under the management of Imperial Oil Ltd. Sold in 1946 to Branch Lines Ltd., Montreal and renamed Polarbranch. Operated under the management of Joseph Simar Group Driven ashore near Barranquilla, Colombia on 28 November 1953. Later refloated, and towed to Cristóbal on 13 December. Sold to Straits Towing Ltd, Vancouver. Rebuilt as a barge and renamed Straits Conveyor. Either subsequently lost off the coast of British Columbia, or scrapped at Tacoma, Washington, United States in 1980.

=== Stanley Park ===
Stanley Park was built by Marine Industries Ltd. She was completed on 24 July 1943. Built for the Park Steamship Co., Montreal, she was operated under the management of Elder Dempster Lines Ltd. Subsequently transferred to MoWT and placed under the management of Dalhousie Steam & Motorship Co. Ltd. Sold in 1948 to Acadia Overseas Freighters (Halifax) Ltd. and renamed Haligonian Duchess. Operated under the management of Rethymnis & Kulukundis Ltd. Renamed Malden Hill in 1950 and management transferred to Counties Ship Management. Collided with the trawler Tobolsk off Murmansk, Soviet Union in December 1962. Sold in 1964 to Trafalgar Steamship Co. Ltd and renamed Newmoor. Operated under the management of Tsavliris (Shipping) Ltd. Sold in1967 to Kantara Shipping Ltd., Famagusta. Scrapped at La Spezia in 1969.

=== Strathcona Park ===
Strathcona Park was a Victory ship built by Burrard Dry Dock Co. Ltd. She was completed on 8 September 1943. Built for the Park Steamship Co., Montreal, she was operated under the management of Furness, Withy & Co. Sold in 1946 to Elder Dempster Lines Ltd., Montreal and renamed Cabano. Reflagged to the United Kingdom in 1950. Sold in 1960 to Sure Shipping Co., Hong Kong and renamed Happy Voyager. Sold in 1963 to Ideal Shipping Co., Hong Kong. Renamed Hitaki in 1964. Scrapped at Hirao in 1966.

=== Sunalta Park ===
Sunalta Park was built by United Shipyards Ltd. She was completed on 1 September 1944. Built for the Park Steamship Co., Montreal, she was operated under the management of Montreal Shipping Co. Sold in 1946 to Montship Lines Ltd., Montreal and renamed Mont Alta. Sold in 1955 to Compania Gloriana de Navigation SA, Monrovia and renamed Georgian Flame. Sold in 1962 to Philippine President Lines Ltd., Manila and renamed Bonifacio. Renamed President Laurel in 1963, the Joseph Laurel in 1967, Laurel in 1968 and Liberty One in 1969. Scrapped at Hirao in 1969.

=== Sunnyside Park ===
Sunnyside Park was built by West Coast Shipbuilders Ltd. She was completed on 20 April 1944. Built for the Park Steamship Co., Montreal, she was operated under the management of Canadian Australasian Line Ltd., Vancouver. Sold to her managers in 1946 and renamed Waitomo. Sold in 1947 to Canadian Union Line Ltd., Vancouver. Suffered a fire in the Society Islands on 20 August 1956 in which a crew member died. An engineer from the ship was charged with murder, but was acquitted. Sold in 1961 to Union Steamship Company of New Zealand. Sold in 1963 to Blue Shark Steamship Co., Panama and renamed Blue Shark. Scrapped at Kaohsiung in 1967.

=== Sunset Park ===
Sunset Park was built by Foundation Maritime Ltd. She was completed on 24 November 1944. Built for the Park Steamship Co., Montreal, she was operated under the management of Canadian National Steamships Ltd. Sold in 1945 to Compania Siderurgica Nacional, Rio de Janeiro and renamed Siderurgica Cinco. Scrapped in Brazil in 1965, or 1968.

=== Sutherland Park ===
Sutherland Park was built by Morton Engineering & Drydock Co. Ltd. She was completed on 31 May 1945. Built for the Park Steamship Co., Montreal, she was operated under the management of Canadian National Steamships Ltd. Sold to her managers in 1947 and renamed Canadian Conqueror. Laid up at Halifax in July 1957. Reported sold in 1958 to Banco Cubana del Comercio Exterior, Havana. Sold in 1960 to Oficina de Formento Maritima Cubano, Havana. However, Heal states the sale was not proceeded with. Scrapped at Bilbao in 1965.

== T— Park ==
=== Taber Park ===
Taber Park was built by Foundation Marine Ltd. She was completed on 28 August 1944. Built for MoWT. Torpedoed and sunk in the North Sea (52°22′N 1°53′E) by a Kriegsmarine Type XXVIIB midget submarine on 13 March 1945.

=== Taronga Park ===
Taronga Park was built by St. John Drydock & Shipbuilding Co. Ltd. She was completed on 17 April 1944. Built for the Park Steamship Co., Montreal, she was subsequently transferred to the Australian Government. Sold in 1947 to Federal Commerce & Navigation Co., Montreal and renamed Federal Ranger. Sold in 1948 to Jens Toft A/S, Copenhagen and renamed Marie Toft. Sold in 1951 to A/B Helge, Gothenburg, Sweden and renamed J. E. Manne. Operated under the management of Claes Manne. Sold in 1956 to Jansens Rederia A/S, Bergen and renamed J. E. M. Næss. Operated under the management of Ingvar Jansen. Sold in 1963 to Maresol Compania Navigation S.A., Piraeus and renamed Hermes Leader. Renamed Leader One in 1969. Sold in 1971 to Astro Valeroso Compania Navigation, Panama and renamed Panaghia M. Renamed Merian in 1975. Wrecked off Othoni, Greece in 1977 and consequently scrapped at Vlorë, Albania.

=== Tecumseh Park ===
Tecumseh Park was built by West Coast Shipbuilders Ltd. Launched as Fort St. Ignace, she was completed as Tecumseh Park on 23 October 1943. Built for Park Steamship Co., Montreal, she was placed under the management of Canadian Transport Co. Ltd. In distress and reported to be breaking up in the Atlantic Ocean 840 nautical miles (1,560 km) east of Halifax on 14 January 1947. A coastguard cutter and two tugs were sent to her rescue. USAT General M. L. Hersey stood by for two days before she managed to get under way. Sold in 1947 to Argonaut Navigation Co., Montreal and renamed Argovan. Reflagged to the United Kingdom in 1954. Sold in 1959 to Strovili Compania Navigation, Piraeus and renamed Cardamilitis. Scrapped at Shanghai in 1967.

=== Temagami Park ===
Temagami Park was built by North Vancouver Ship Repairs Ltd. She was completed on 15 February 1944. Built for the Park Steamship Co., Montreal, she was operated under the management of Angloa-Canadian Shipping Co. Sold in 1946 to Western Canada Steamships Ltd., Vancouver and renamed Lake Pennask. Sold in 1954 to Bahia Salinas Compania Navigation SA., Monrovia and renamed Cygnet. Operated under the management of Goulandris Bros. Sold in 1958 to Villaviosa Compania Navigation SA, Panama and renamed Cresta. Operated under the management of Ormos Shipping Co. Ltd. Reflagged to Greece in 1969. Scrapped at Shanghai in 1970.

=== Tipperary Park ===
Tipperary Park was built by Burrard Dry Dock Co. Ltd. She was completed on 28 February 1944. Built for the Park Steamship Co., Montreal, she was operated under the management of Canadian Shipping Co. Sold in 1946 to Western Canada Steamship Co., Vancouver and renamed Lake Shawinigan. Renamed Table Bay in 1950 and placed under the management of Lyle Shipping Co. Ltd. Sold in 1957 to Jugoslavenska Oceanska Plovidba, Kotor and renamed Rumija. Sold in 1967 to Ruma Shipping Co., Panama and renamed Ruma. Scrapped at Kaohsiung in 1968.

=== Tobiatic Park ===
Tobiatic Park was built by Burrard Dry Dock Co. Ltd. She was completed on 1 September 1944. Built for the Park Steamship Co., Montreal, she was operated under the management of Seaboard Shipping Co., Vancouver. Sold to her managers in 1946 and renamed Seaboard Trader. Sold in 1954 to Bahia Salinas Compania Navigation SA, Panama and renamed Trader. She collided with the Victory ship Flandres in the English Channel 4 nautical miles (7.4 km) south of the East Goodwin Lightship on 16 October 1957. Sold to Taiwan in 1966. Scrapped at Osaka, Japan in 1967.

=== Tuxedo Park ===
Tuxedo Park was built by West Coast Shipbuilders Ltd. She was completed on 19 July 1944. Built for the Park Steamship Co., Montreal, she was operated under the management of Empire Shipping Co. Sold in 1946 to Lunham & Moore (Canada) Ltd., Montreal and renamed Angusdale, or Angusglen. Sold in 1948 to Navitrans Corp., Panama and renamed Point Aconi. Operated under the management of Piero Ravano. Sold in 1965 to Salix Compania Navigation, Panama and renamed Phopho Xila. Scrapped at Hong Kong in 1968.

=== Tweedsmuir Park ===
Tweedsmuir Park was built by Marine Industries Ltd. She was completed on 12 May 1943. Built for the Park Steamship Co., Montreal, she was operated under the management of McLean, Kennedy Ltd. Transferred to MoT in 1946. Operated under the management of Aviation & Shipping Co. Ltd. Management transferred to Stott, Mann & Fleming in 1950. Sold that year to Bedford Overseas Freighters Ltd., Halifax. Operated under the management of P. D. Marchessini & Co. Ltd. Sold in 1955 to Glenrock Shipping Co. Ltd., Montreal and renamed Lord Tweedsmuir. Operated under the management of J. P. Hadoulis Ltd. Scrapped at Kinoe, Japan in 1961.

== V— Park ==
=== Victoria Park ===
Victoria Park was built by Foundation Maritime Ltd. She was completed on 27 April 1943. Built for the Park Steamship Co., Montreal, she was operated under the management of Johnson Walton Steamships Ltd., Vancouver. Sold to her managers in 1946 and renamed Tatuk. Operated under the management of the Danish East Asiatic Company. Sold in 1948 to Dampskibs Bothnia, Copenhagen and renamed Kalo. Operated under the management of Christian Jensen. Sold in 1957 to Pahaghia Steamship Corp., Monrovia and renamed Ester. Sold in 1963 to Marcorona Compania Navigation, Monrovia and renamed San John P. Sold in 1965 to O/Y Ridal A/B, Helsinki, Finland and renamed Ramsdal I. Operated under the management of Rudolf Johnsson. Sold in 1966 to Maderas del Darien, Barranquilla and renamed Rio Atrato. Sold in 1971 to Compania Agropecuaria y Maritima Santa Rosa, Barranquilla. Scrapped at Colômbia, Brazil post-1981.

== W— Park ==
=== Wascana Park ===
Wascana Park was built by Burrard Dry Dock Co. Ltd. She was completed on 28 August 1943. Built for the Park Steamship Co., Montreal, she was operated under the management of North Pacific Shipping Co. Sold in 1946 to Elder Dempster Lines Ltd., Montreal and renamed Cargill. Reflagged to the United Kingdom in 1950. Broke down off IJmuiden, Netherlands on 6 October 1954. Her engine was repaired and she put in to Amsterdam, Netherlands. Sold in 1960 to Prestige Shipping Co., Hong Kong and renamed Marine Navigator. Renamed Marine Ace in 1962. Scrapped at Hirao in 1966.

=== Waverley Park ===
Waverley Park was built by West Coast Shipbuilders Ltd. She was completed on 9 March 1945. Built for the Park Steamship Co., Montreal, she was operated under the management of Constantine Lines (Canada) Ltd. Sold in 1946 to Dingwall Shipping Co. Ltd., Halifax and renamed Dingwall. Operated under the management of Quebec Steamship Lines and National Gypsum Co. Sold in 1955 to Compania de Navigation Gaviota SA, Panama and renamed Rayo. Suffered an onboard fire at Hull, United Kingdom on 23 September 1958. Sold in 1960 to Compania de Navigation Mario, Panama and renamed Maripindo. Reflagged to Liberia in 1961. Scrapped at Vado Ligure in 1970.

=== Wellington Park ===
Wellington Park was built by United Shipyards Ltd. She was completed on 2 November 1944. Built for the Park Steamship Co., Montreal, she was operated under the management of Cunard White Star Ltd. Sold in 1948 to Saguenay Terminals Ltd and renamed Sunwhit. Reflagged to the United Kingdom in 1955. Sold in 1960 to Pacific Trading & Navigation Co., Panama and renamed Ceres. Scrapped at Izumiōtsu in 1970.

=== Wentworth Park ===
Wentworth Park was built by Foundation Marine Ltd. She was completed on 25 October 1944. Built for the Park Steamship Co., Montreal, she was operated under the management of Saguenay Terminals Ltd., Montreal. Sold to her managers in 1946 and renamed Sundial. Reflagged to the United Kingdom in 1955. Sold in 1958 to Carga Maritima SA, Monrovia and renamed Celeste. Reflagged to Greece in 1961. Sold later that year to Toro Shipping Corp., Piraeus and renamed Nadine. Sold in 1965 to Pasmo Shipping Corp., Panama and renamed Azar. Ran aground off Punta Brava on 25 February 1968 and caught fire. Declared a total loss.

=== Westbank Park ===
Westbank Park was built by North Vancouver Ship Repairs Ltd. She was completed on 9 March 1944. Built for the Park Steamship Co., Montreal, she was operated under the management of Seaboard Shipping Co. Driven ashore and wrecked at Cabo San Lucas, Mexico on 7 October 1945. Canada renounced her rights to salvage on 2 May 1947.

=== Westdale Park ===
Westdale Park was built by Morton Engineering & Drydock Co. Ltd. She was completed on 19 August 1945. Built for the Park Steamship Co., Montreal, she was operated under the management of Canadian National Steamship Co., Montreal. Sold to her managers in 1946 and renamed Canadian Observer. Laid up at Halifax in 1958. Reported sold in 1958 to Banco Cubana del Comercio Exterior, Havana. Sold in 1960 to Oficina de Formento Maritima Cubano, Havana. However, Heal states the sale was not proceeded with. Scrapped at Bilbao in 1965.

=== Westend Park ===
Westend Park was built by Burrard Dry Dock Co. Ltd. She was completed on 20 July 1944. Built for the Park Steamship Co., Montreal, she was operated under the management of North Pacific Shipping Co. Sold in 1947 to Triton Steamship Co. Ltd., Montreal and renamed Triberg. Sold in 1954 to Nueva Sevilla Compania Navigation SA, Panama and renamed Sevilla. Reflagged to Greece in 1960 and renamed Naxos. Sold in 1962 to Adab Sociètè Anonyme, Beirut and renamed Stevo. Sold in 1969 to Sociètè d'Avances Comerciales, Mogadishu and renamed Marie. Scrapped at Split in 1971.

=== Westmount Park ===
Westmount Park was built by United Shipyards Ltd. She was completed on 18 September 1943. Built for the Park Steamship Co., Montreal, she was operated under the management of Furness, Withy & Co. Transferred to MoT in 1946. Operated under the management of Andrew Crawford & Co. Ltd. Rammed the Barton Road Swing Bridge, United Kingdom on 28 December 1948. Sold in 1950 to Fairview Overseas Freighters Ltd., Halifax and renamed Nordicstar. Operated under the management of C. M. Lemnos & Co. Ltd. Last reported in the Atlantic Ocean (approx 44°N 38°W) on 27 December 1956. Posted missing.

=== Weston Park ===
Weston Park was built by West Coast Shipbuilders Ltd. She was completed on 3 October 1944. Built for the Park Steamship Co., Montreal, she was operated under the management of North Pacific Shipping Co. Sold om 1946 to Western Canada Steamship Co. Ltd., Vancouver and renamed Lake Sicamous. Sold in 1953 to Panedo Compania Navigation SA, Panama and renamed Archipelago. Sold in 1960 to Silver Star Shipping Corp., Monrovia and renamed Silver Valley. Ran aground at the mouth of the Douro on 15 March 1963. Broke in two the next day. Declared a total loss.

=== Westview Park ===
Westview Park was built by Prince Rupert Drydock & Shipyard. Launched as Fort Beaver Lake, she was completed as Westview Park on 20 October 1944. Transfer to MoWT not completed. To Park Steamship Co. Operated under the management of Seaboard Shipping Co. Sold in 1946 to Seaboard Owners Ltd., Vancouver and renamed Seaboard Enterprise. Reflagged to United Kingdom in 1954. Sold in 1957 to Doric Steamship Co., Monrovia and renamed Doric. Operated under the management of Ormos Shipping Co. Ltd. Reflagged to Greece in 1961. Sold in 1963 to Patagonia Compania de Inversiones, Andros and renamed Patagonia. Operated under the management of Goulandris. Sold in 1966 to Meandros Shipping Co., Famagusta and renamed Mary F. Operated under the management of Livanos. Sold in 1967 to Mary S Shipping Co., Famagusta. Operated under the management of E. Frangos. Scrapped at Shanghai, China in 1969.

=== Whiterock Park ===
Whiterock Park was built by North Vancouver Ship Repairs Ltd. Launched as Fort Daer, she was completed as Whiterock Park on 11 October 1944. Built for Park Steamship Co., she was placed under the management of Johnson, Walton Steamship Co., Vancouver. Sold to her managers in 1946 and renamed Tantara. Sold in 1951 to Compania Maritima Samsoc Ltda, Monrovia and renamed Pelopidas. Operated under the management of Hermes Steamship Agency. Sold in 1956 to West African Navigation Ltd., Monrovia and renamed African Count. Trapped in the Suez Canal in November 1956 as a result of the Suez Crisis. Released on 28 January 1957. Scrapped at Izumiōtsu in 1963.

=== Whiteshell Park ===
Whiteshell Park was built by United Shipyards Ltd. Launched as Fort Beauharnois, she was completed as Whiteshell Park on 14 April 1944. Built for Park Steamship Co., she was placed under the management of Canadian Pacific Steamships Limited. To MoT in 1946 and placed under the management of Novocastria Shipping Co. Management changed in 1950 to W. H. Cockerline & Co. Sold later that year to Halifax Overseas Freighters Ltd., Halifax and renamed Fir Hill. Operated under the management of Counties Ship Management Ltd. Sold in 1964 to International Steamship Corp., London and renamed Universal Trader. Ran aground off Yasuoka, Japan on 7 December 1967 and consequently scrapped at Hirao, Japan in 1968.

=== Wildewood Park ===
Wildewood Park was a Victory tanker built by West Coast Shipbuilders Ltd. She was completed on 12 January 1944. Built for the Park Steamship Co., Montreal, she was operated under the management of Imperial Oil Ltd. Sold in 1947 to Irving Oil Ltd., Saint John and renamed Irvingdale. Scrapped at Valencia in 1961.

=== Willow Park ===
Willow Park was built by Davie Shipbuilding & Repairing Ltd. She was completed on 20 December 1944. Built for MoWT. Sold in 1946 to Centre d'Approvisionment de l'Indochine, Saigon and renamed Docteur Roux. Sold in 1955 to Compagnie de Transportes Maritime de l'Afrique Occidentale Française, Konakri, French Guinea and renamed Danakil. Seized by Indonesian Government in 1960. Renamed Kapitan Banakri in 1966, scrapped later that year.

=== Willowdale Park ===
Willowdale Park was a Victory tanker built by West Coast Shipbuilders Ltd. She was completed on 11 March 1944. Built for the Park Steamship Co., Montreal, she was operated under the management of Imperial Oil Ltd. Sold inn 1946 to Skibselskab A/S Songdal, Kristiansand and renamed Georgia. Operated under the management of J. Gertrard Jr. Converted to cargo ship in 1955. Sold in 1957 to Lloyd Venezianoa S.p.A., Venice, Italy and renamed San Polo Sold in 1959 to Jadranska Slobodna Plovidba, Split and renamed Matija Gubec. Scrapped at Sakai, Japan in 1967.

=== Windermere Park ===
Windermere Park was built by West Coast Shipbuilders Ltd. Launched as Fort Miami, she was completed as Windermere Park on 12 November 1943. Built for the Park Steamship Co., Montreal, she was operated under the management of Canadian Shipping Co. Sold in 1946 to Western Canada Steamships Ltd, Vancouver and renamed Lake Sumas. Sold in 1949 to Compania Carreto de Navigation, Panama and renamed Katherine. Sold in 1961 to Orient Shipping Corp., Beirut and renamed Nagos. Operated under the management of M. Livanos. Sold in 1965 to Zannis Compania Navigation, Beirut. Operated under the management of A. Halicoussis. Scrapped at Hong Kong in 1968.

=== Winnepegosis Park ===
Winnepegosis Park was built by Prince Rupert Drydock & Shipyard. Launched as Fort Aspin, she was completed as Winnepegosis Park on 26 November 1943. Built for Park Steamship Co., Montreal, she was placed under the management of Canada Shipping Co. Sold in 1947 to Andros Shipping Co., Montreal and renamed Bayside. Sold in 1950 to Guardia Compania Navigacion S.A., Panama and renamed Aghia Anastasia. Ran aground off Tobago on 22 June 1950. She was refloated but sank on 25 June (11°09′N 60°56′W).

=== Winona Park ===
Winona Park was built byy West Coast Shipbuilders Ltd. She was completed on 23 December 1944. Built for the Park Steamship Co., Montreal, she was operated under the management of Canada Shipping Co. Sold in 1046 to Western Canada Steamship Co. Ltd., Vancouver and renamed Lake Tatla. Renamed Walvis Bay in 1950 and placed under the management of Sir R. Ropner & Co. Management Ltd. Sold in 1957 to Andros Shipping & Trading Co., Piraeus and renamed Andros Halcyon. Sold later that year to Maritima Anonima Siciliana, Palermo and renamed M.A.S. Primo Operated under the management of Pasqale Mazzella. Sold in 1959 to Kirlangiclar Silepoilik, Istanbul and renamed Kirlangiclar Scrapped at Kaohsiung in 1973.

=== Withrow Park ===
Withrow Park was built by United Shipyards Ltd. She was completed on 25 July 1944. Built for the Park Steamship Co., Montreal, she was operated under the management of McLean, Kennedy Ltd. To MoT in 1946, operated under the management of South American Saint Line. Sold in 1950 to Kingsbridge Shipping Co., London and renamed Kingsbridge. Operated under the management of Goulandris Bros. Scrapped at Hong Kong in 1960.

=== Woodland Park ===
Woodland Park was built by Foundation Maritime Ltd. She was completed on 7 December 1943. Built for the Park Steamship Co., Montreal. To MowT in 1944. Operated under the management of Pelton Steamship Co. Sold in 1946 to Centre d'Approvisionment de l'Indochine, Saigon and renamed Huynh Khuong An. Renamed Dr. Phan Hun Chi in 1948. Sold in 1952 to Charles Audibert, Monaco and renamed Vimy. Sold in 1955 to D. J. Papadimitriou Sons, Alexandria, Egypt and renamed Dimitris. Ran aground near Kotka, Finland on 29 September 1956. Refloated but declared a constructive total loss. Sold and repaired. Sold in 1959 to San Dimitris Navigation Corp., Monrovia and renamed Dimitrakis P. Sold in 1960 to Compania Transmediterranea de Transportes de Maderas, Beirut and renamed Elli. Sold in 1964 to Rhea Compania Navigation, Monrovia and renamed Aspasia. Scrapped at Bilbao in 1968.

== Y— Park ==
=== Yamaska Park ===
Yamaska Park was built by Marine Industries Ltd. She was completed on 31 July 1944. Built for the Park Steamship Co., Montreal, she was operated under the management of Furness, Withy & Co. Transferred to MoT in 1946, operated under the management of Novocastria Shipping Co. Management transferred to W. H. Seager & Co. Ltd. in 1950. Sold in 1951 to Yamaska Steamship Co. Ltd., Montreal and renamed Yamaska. Operated under the management of Ships Finance & Management Co. Ltd. Sold in 1959 to Dah Lien Shipping Co., Hong Kong and renamed Gunn. Sold to China later that year and renamed Hoping 30. Renamed Zhan Dou 30 in 1967. Deleted from shipping registers in 1992.

=== Yoho Park (I) ===
Yoho Park was built by North Vancouver Ship Repairs Ltd. She was launched as Fort Highfield and completed as Yoho Park on 22 July 1943. Built for Park Steamship Co., Montreal, she was placed under the management of Canadian Australasian Line. To MoWT in 1944 and renamed Fort Highfield. Operated under the management of Dalhousie Steam & Motorship Co. to MoT in 1950, operated under the management of W. H. Seager & Co. Sold in 1951 to Dartmouth Overseas Freighters Ltd., London and renamed Darfield. Operated under the management of Nomikos (London) Ltd. Sold in 1952 to Windsor Overseas Freighters Ltd., London, remaining under the management of Nomikos. Ran aground north of Los Angeles, California, United States on 28 February 1954. Refloated on 2 March and towed in to Los Angeles. Declared a constructive total loss, she was scrapped at Terminal Island, California in May 1954.

=== Yoho Park (II) ===
Yoho Park was built by North Vancouver Ship Repairs Ltd. She was launched as Fort Highfield and completed as Yoho Park on 22 July 1944. Built for Park Steamship Co., Montreal, she was placed under the management of Canadian Australasian Line. Sold in 1946 to Western Canada Steamships Ltd., Vancouver and renamed Lake Winnipeg. Sold in 1953 to Altos Mares Compania Navigation, Monrovia and renamed Americana. Operated under the management of A. Lusi Ltd. Reflagged to Greece in 1961. Scrapped at Etajima, Japan in 1967.
