= La Lisa =

- Municipality of Havana
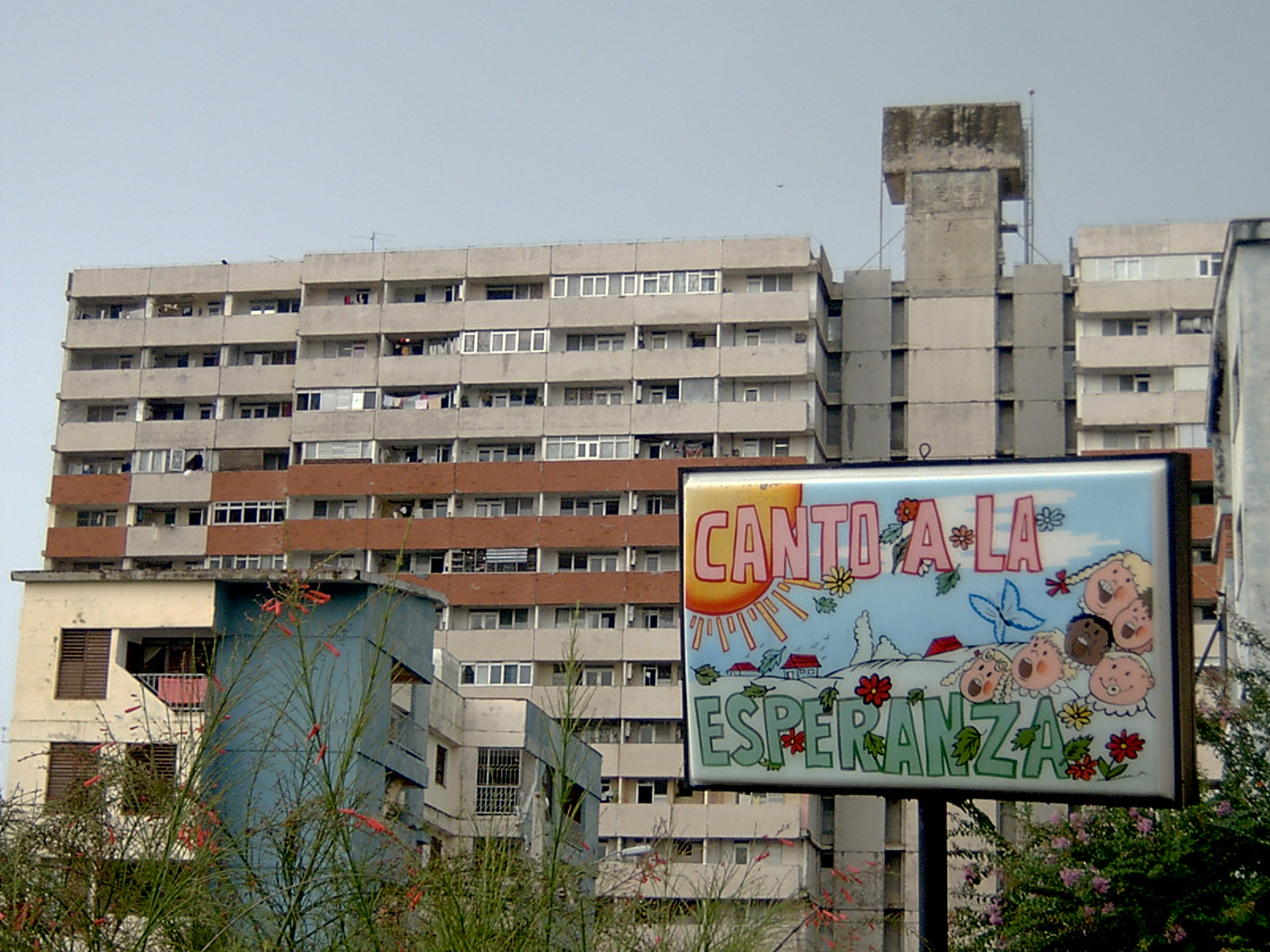

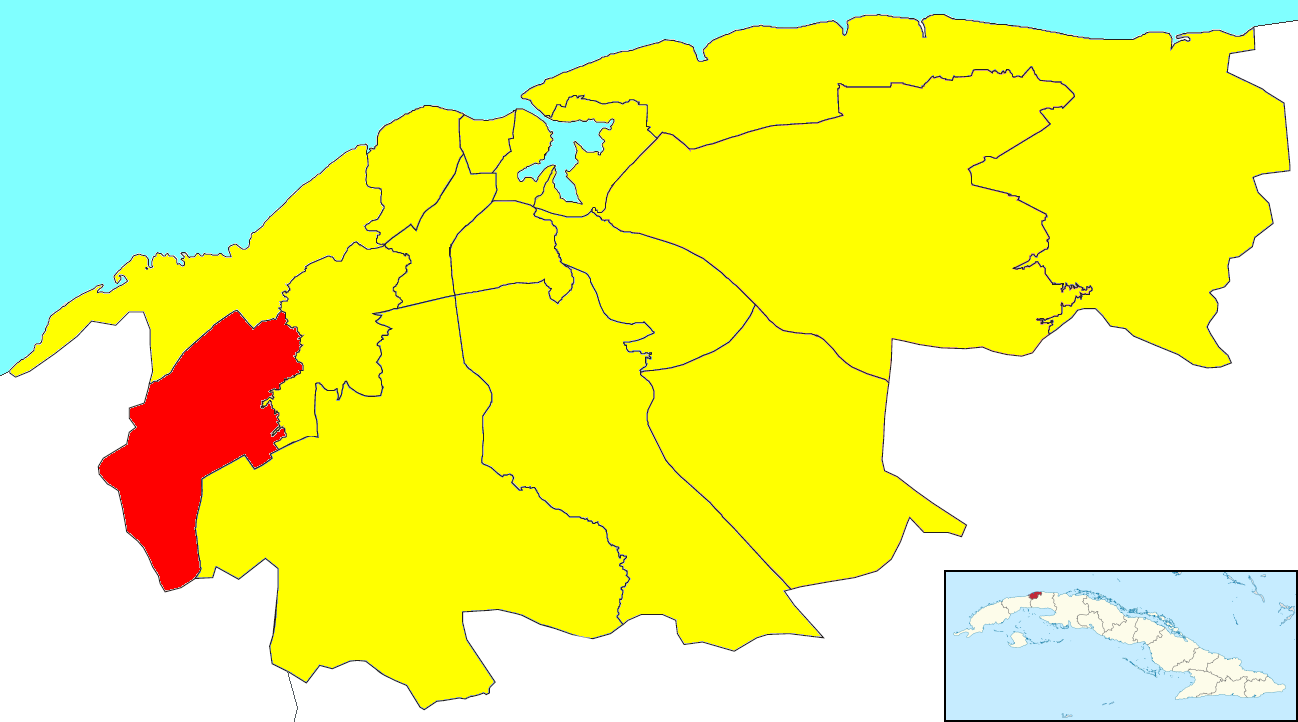
- Location of La Lisa in Havana
- Coordinates: 23°01′29″N 82°27′47″W
- Country: Cuba
- Province: Ciudad de La Habana
- Wards (Consejos Populares): Alturas de La Lisa, Arroyo Arenas, Balcón Arimao, El Cano-Valle Grande-Bello 26 y Morado, Punta Brava, San Agustín, Versalles-Coronela

Government
  - President: Yoamel Acosta Morales

Area
  - Total: 37.5 km^{2} (14.5 sq mi)

Population (2022)
  - Total: 147,415
  - Density: 3,930/km^{2} (10,200/sq mi)
- Time zone: UTC-5 (EST)
- Area code: +53-7

La Lisa (Spanish pronunciation: [la ˈlisa]) is one of the 15 municipalities or boroughs (municipios in Spanish) in the city of Havana, Cuba.

== Overview ==
It has 7 neighbourhoods:

- Alturas de La Lisa
- Arroyo Arenas
- Balcón Arimao
- El Cano-Valle Grande-Bello 26 y Morado
- Punta Brava
- San Agustín
- Versalles-Coronela.

It can be generally thought of as a semi-rural municipality.
