= Punta Brava =

Cuban suburb

Coordinates: 23°01′00″N 82°29′51″W

Punta Brava is a small suburb located just to the southwest of Havana, Cuba, with a population of roughly 1500 inhabitants. It is one of the wards (consejos populares) of the La Lisa municipality.

== Cuban War of Independence ==
Punta Brava and the nearby town of Guatao were the scene of massacres during the Cuban War of Independence; Cuban General General Maceo died there in battle on December 7, 1896. Fidel Castro referred to Maceo's death in Punta Brava in 1992 ("Maceo, you were not defeated the day you fell in Punta Brava); on the other hand, for Castro's father, Ángel Castro y Argiz, the day Maceo died had been "one of the best and proudest days of that war," since it was his company that killed the general.

The next year, Punta Brava was the site where a naked American named Kelley surrendered to the Spanish commander and was given a shirt and a pair of trousers: Kelley, who had disappeared from Havana in early April 1897, had reportedly told the insurgents that he was an expert in dynamite. They, believing he was a spy, stripped and hanged him, but the rope broke and Kelley managed to escape, naked but otherwise intact.

== 1906 uprising ==
In 1906, an unsuccessful insurrection was deemed to be ended after a "negro Gen[eral] Quentin Bandera, the most daring insurgent in Havana province," was killed near Punta Brava with two "mulatto comrades all frightfully gashed by the machetes of the mounted rural guards who ended their careers."

== Cuban Missile Crisis ==
During the 1962 Cuban Missile Crisis, the Soviets reportedly built a missile site in Punta Brava.

== Notables ==
- Tony Pacheco
