= List of shipwrecks in March 1945 =

The list of shipwrecks in March 1945 includes ships sunk, foundered, grounded, or otherwise lost during March 1945.

== 1 March ==
List of shipwrecks: 1 March 1945
Ship	State	Description
Chohakusan Maru	Japan	World War II: The Kongosan Maru-class auxiliary gunboat was sunk in shallow waters in the Pacific Ocean off Naha, Okinawa by United States Navy aircraft. The wreck was moved to deeper water during a tunnel project sometime between November 1997 and July 2006. The new wreck site was located on 3 August 2019.
Chōkai Maru	Japan	The auxiliary guard ship was lost on this date.
Daiken Maru	Japan	World War II: The transport was sunk in the Pacific Ocean off Miyako Jima (24°23′N 124°12′E) by United States Navy aircraft from Task Force 38; twenty passengers and sixteen crewmen were killed.
Daishin Maru	Japan	World War II: Convoy KATA-604: The transport was sunk in Kuji Bay, Amami Ōshima by United States Navy aircraft from Task Force 38. Sixty passengers and two crewmen were killed.
Eisho Maru	Japan	World War II: Convoy HI-88G: The oiler was bombed and sunk off Yulin, Hainan Island. Twenty-nine passengers and seven crewmen were killed.
USS Hannibal	United States	The collier was bombed and sunk as a target in Chesapeake Bay.
Hokuhi Maru	Japan	World War II: The auxiliary transport (948 GRT 1903) was bombed and sunk by Consolidated B-24 Liberator aircraft south of Mako, Formosa (25°35′N 119°38′E). Personnel transferred to Boat No. 210.
Hoshi Maru No. 11	Japan	World War II: Convoy KATA-604: The transport (a.k.a. Juichei Maru) was sunk in Kuji Bay, Amami Ōshima by United States Navy aircraft from Task Force 38. Lost on board were 82 Imperial Japanese Army explosive motor boats.
Kinezaki	Japan	World War II: Convoy KATA-604: The Kinezaki-class supply ship was bombed and sunk in Kuji Bay, Amami Ōshima (28°10′N 129°05′E) by United States Navy aircraft from Task Force 38.
Kinzan Maru	Japan	World War II: The transport was sunk off Kuji Bay, Amami ŌŌshima by United States Navy aircraft from Task Force 38. Two gunners were killed.
M 2	Germany	World War II: The Type 1935 minesweeper was bombed and sunk in Fedjeford, Norway by Royal Air Force aircraft.
M 575	Germany	The Type 1916 minesweeper sank during a storm in the Little Belt. 43 crew who died were buried in Sweden.
Maddalena G.	Germany	World War II: The cargo ship was scuttled at Lido di Venezia, Italy. The wreck was scrapped in 1946.
Manazuru	Japan	World War II: The Chidori-class torpedo boat was sunk in the Pacific Ocean off Naha, Okinawa (26°17′N 127°35′E) by United States Navy aircraft from Task Force 38.
Robert L. Vann	United States	World War II: The Liberty ship struck a mine and sank in the North Sea off Ostend, West Flanders, Belgium (51°23′N 2°51′E).
S 220	Germany	World War II: The Type 1939/40 Schnellboot was sunk by the British warship HMS Seymour in the North Sea. Three crewmen were killed.
Taisui Maru	Japan	World War II: The cargo ship struck a mine and sank off Shimonoseki.
Tateyama Maru	Japan	World War II: The cargo ship was torpedoed and sunk in the Pacific Ocean south of Honshu by the U.S. Navy submarine USS Sterlet.
Toyosaka Maru	Japan	World War II: Convoy SA-11: The Toyosaka Maru-class auxiliary transport was sunk in the Pacific Ocean off Miyako Jima (24°23′N 124°12′E) by United States Navy aircraft from Task Force 38. Four crewmen were killed.
Tsubame	Japan	World War II: Convoy SA-11: The Tsubame-class minelayer was torpedoed and sunk off Miyako Jima in the Pacific Ocean (24°23′N 124°12′E) by United States Navy aircraft from Task Force 38.

== 2 March ==
List of shipwrecks: 2 March 1945
Ship	State	Description
BO-224	Soviet Navy	World War II: The BO-201-class submarine chaser was torpedoed and sunk in the Barents Sea (69°21′N 33°38′E) by U-995 (Kriegsmarine) with the loss of seven of her 31 crew.
Chokai Maru	Japan	World War II: The guard boat was torpedoed and sunk in the Pacific Ocean south of Honshu by USS Bowfin (United States).
F 237A	Germany	The MFP-A landing craft was sunk on this date.
Frontenac Victory and Lone Jack	Both United States	The Victory ship Frontenac Victory and the T2 tanker Lone Jack collided in the Atlantic Ocean (37°42′N 57°53′W. Both vessels were damaged. Frontenack Victory put back to New York for repairs. Lone Jack was abandoned by her crew. She was subsequently towed to Bermuda, then New York. She was repaired at Baltimore, Maryland and returned to service.
King Edgar	United Kingdom	World War II: Convoy SC 167: The cargo ship (4,536 GRT, 1927) was torpedoed and sunk in St. George's Channel (52°05′N 5°42′W) by the Kriegsmarine submarine U-1302 with the loss of four of her 46 crew. Survivors were rescued by the British warship HMS Nyasaland.
USS LCT-1029	United States	World War II: The LCT Mk 6-class landing craft tank was holed in the engine room when she struck a submerged wreck. She was driven ashore on Iwo Jima and abandoned.
Nichirin Maru	Japan	World War II: Convoy SA-11: The auxiliary transport (1,020 GRT 1915) was bombed and sunk in the East China Sea, about 65 nautical miles (120 km; 75 mi) north of Taisho-Jima, Senkaku Shoto (27°12′N 124°22′E) by United States Navy Consolidated PB4Y aircraft from Squadron VPB-119. Seventeen crewmen were killed.
Novasli	Norway	World War II: Convoy SC 167: The cargo ship (3,204 GRT, 1920) was torpedoed and damaged in the Bristol Channel (51°47′N 5°32′W) by the Kriegsmarine submarine U-1302. All 36 crew were rescued by HMT Helier II (United Kingdom), which scuttled the ship.
Rixhöft	Germany	World War II: The tug struck a mine and sank in the Baltic Sea off Warnemünde, Mecklenburg-Western Pomerania. Only 7 of her 26 crew were saved.
U-3519	Germany	World War II: The Type XXI submarine struck a mine and sank in the Baltic Sea off Warnemünde (54°11′N 12°05′E) with the loss of 75 of the 78 people aboard (65 crew and 13 passengers).

== 3 March ==
List of shipwrecks: 3 March 1945
Ship	State	Description
Andros	Germany	World War II: The cargo ship was severely damaged in an Allied air raid on Swinemünde.
F 295	Germany	World War II: The A Type Marinefährprahm was sunk by an air attack off Storvik, Norway.
Hario	Japan	World War II: Convoy HI-94: The Hario-class fleet oiler struck a mine in Yulinakin Bay off Cape Bastion, Hainan Island, China (18°10′N 109°40′E). She sank the next day.
Nissho Maru No. 2	Japan	World War II: The Nissho Maru No. 2-class auxiliary transport was torpedoed and sunk in the Pacific Ocean south of Honshu, 22 nautical miles (41 km; 25 mi) east north east of Mikura-jima (34°05′N 139°54′W) by the U.S. Navy submarine USS Trepang with the loss of 38 crewmen.
HMS Sealion	United Kingdom	The S-class submarine (768/960 t, 1934) was scuttled as an ASDIC target off the Isle of Arran, Scotland.
HMT Southern Flower	United Kingdom	World War II: The naval trawler (328 GRT, 1928) was torpedoed and sunk in the Atlantic Ocean off Reykjavík, Iceland (64°05′N 23°15′W) by the Kriegsmarine submarine U-1022 with the loss of 25 of her 26 crew.
HMAS Steady Hour	Royal Australian Navy	The patrol boat (50 GRT, 1940) was destroyed in a fire off Darwin, Australia.
Suiten Maru	Japan	World War II: The auxiliary transport ship was torpedoed and sunk in the Java Sea north of Malang, Java (06°29′S 112°48′E) by the U.S. Navy submarine USS Sea Robin. 32 crewmen were killed.
T-143	Japan	World War II: The No. 103-class landing ship was bombed and sunk at 23°35′N 121°03′E by U.S. 5th Air Force North American B-25 Mitchell aircraft.
Yaei Maru No. 1	Japan	World War II: Convoy HI-88G: The oiler (a.k.a. Iyasaka Maru No. 1) was bombed and sunk in Linkao Bay, Hainan Island (18°32′N 108°16′E). Two passengers, two gunners, and 27 crewmen were killed.

== 4 March ==
List of shipwrecks: 4 March 1945
Ship	State	Description
CH-8	Japan	World War II: The No.4-class submarine chaser was shelled and sunk in the Strait of Malacca (04°04′N 110°35′E) by HMS Terrapin and HMS Trenchant (both United Kingdom). There were 108 survivors.
Kiku Maru	Japan	World War II: The auxiliary submarine chaser was torpedoed and sunk in the Strait of Malacca by the British submarine HMS Clyde.
Palembang Maru	Japan	World War II: Convoy HI-98: The Standard Type 1TM tanker was torpedoed and sunk off Cap Varella, French Indochina (12°52′N 103°30′E) by the U.S. Navy submarine USS Baya. Sixty-seven crewmen, 59 gunners, and nine passengers were killed.
Siko Maru	Japan	World War II: The vessel was sunk in the Pacific Ocean south of Kyushu by USS Tilefish (United States).
U-3508	Germany	World War II: The Type XXI submarine was bombed and sunk at Wilhelmshaven, Lower Saxony in an Allied air raid. She was subsequently raised.

== 5 March ==
List of shipwrecks: 5 March 1945
Ship	State	Description
Kasuga Maru	Japan	World War II: Convoy SAYU-02: The auxiliary submarine chaser was sunk by United States 5th Air Force North American B-25 Mitchell aircraft off French Indochina (15°32′N 108°37′E).
HMS LCP(R) 979	United Kingdom	World War II: The landing craft personnel (ramped) (5.9/8.2 t, 1943) was lost in the Eastern Theatre.
USS LCS(L)-127	United States	The landing craft support grounded on San Clemente Island, California and was declared a total loss.
Manyo Maru	Japan	World War II: The auxiliary gunboat was torpedoed and sunk in the Java Sea by the U.S. Navy submarine USS Sea Robin.
Nagara Maru	Japan	World War II: The auxiliary netlayer was torpedoed and sunk in the Java Sea south west of the Masalembu Islands, Netherlands East Indies (05°41′S 114°01′E) by USS Sea Robin (United States).
Ryoei Maru	Japan	World War II: Convoy HI-98: The tanker was torpedoed and sunk in the South China Sea north-east of Tourane, French Indochina (16°46′N 108°41′E) by USS Bashaw (United States). Nine passengers, nineteen gunners and nineteen crewmen were killed.
S 626	Germany	World War II: The MAS 501-class MAS boat was shelled and damaged by mistake by German shore batteries, later sank while under tow near La Spezia, Italy.
Seishin Maru	Japan	World War II: The tanker was torpedoed and sunk in the South China Sea by USS Bashaw (United States).
Shoyo Maru	Japan	World War II: The cargo ship was torpedoed and sunk in the Java Sea by USS Sea Robin (United States).
Tamon Maru No. 4	Japan	World War II: The tanker was torpedoed and sunk in the Pacific Ocean south of Honshu by USS Sterlet (United States).
Ujina Maru	Japan	World War II: Convoy SAYU-02: The auxiliary submarine chaser was sunk by United States 5th Air Force B-25 Mitchell aircraft off French Indochina (15°32′N 108°37′E).
W-15	Japan	World War II: Convoy MOTA-40: The No.13-class minesweeper was torpedoed in the stern off Akusekijima, Ryukyu Islands (29°36′N 129°45′E) by USS Tilefish (United States) and beached on Suwasi Island. Declared a constructive total loss.
Yusen Maru No. 11 GO	Japan	World War II: Convoy SAYU-02: The auxiliary submarine chaser was lost on this date.

== 6 March ==
List of shipwrecks: 6 March 1945
Ship	State	Description
Empire Geraint	United Kingdom	World War II: The tanker (6,991 GRT, 1942) was torpedoed and damaged at Milford Haven, Pembrokeshire by U-775 (Kriegsmarine). She was beached with her back broken. Refloated on 30 April, repaired and returned to service.
Green Hill Park	Canada	The Park ship (7,168 GRT, 1944) was damaged by fire at Vancouver, British Columbia. She was declared a constructive total loss but was repaired and re-entered service in 1946 as the Panamanian-flagged Phaeax II.
Hansa	Germany	World War II: The transport ship struck a mine in the Baltic Sea off the Gedser Lightship (Germany). She was taken in tow for Warnemünde but consequently sank. The whole crew was saved. She was salvaged in December 1949 and returned to service by the Soviet Union in 1950.
IV 53 Scarpanto	Germany	World War II: The guard ship was sunk by three Royal Navy ships off the Istrian coast. Raised, repaired, and put in Yugoslav service as Pag in 1952.
HMS LCT 492	United Kingdom	The landing craft tank Mk 3 (350/625 t, 1944) capsized and sank in the Red Sea.
Rikko Maru	Japan	World War II: The Imperial Japanese Army-chartered Rikko Maru-class auxiliary tanker broke in two at the location of a torpedo hit inflicted on 31 August 1944 and sank off Kirun, Formosa (25°09′N 121°44′E) during a typhoon while awaiting repairs.
Robert Mohring	Germany	World War II: The hospital ship was bombed and sunk in a RAF Bomber Command air raid on Saßnitz, Mecklenburg-Western Pomerania with the loss of 353 lives.
UJ 1119 Julius Pickenpack	Germany	World War II: The Este-class submarine chaser was sunk in a RAF Bomber Command air raid on Saßnitz.
XE 11	United Kingdom	The midget submarine (30.3/33.6 t, 1944) collided with a Royal Navy boom defence vessel in Loch Striven with the loss of two of her four crew.
Z28	Germany	World War II: The Type 1936A-class destroyer was sunk in a RAF Bomber Command air raid on Saßnitz. 150 crewmen died.

== 7 March ==
List of shipwrecks: 7 March 1945
Ship	State	Description
F 200	Germany	World War II: The Marinefährprahm was sunk in the Kattegat by de Havilland Mosquito aircraft of 235 and 248 Squadrons, Royal Air Force.
F 218	Germany	World War II: The Marinefährprahm was sunk in the Kattegat by de Havilland Mosquito aircraft on 235 and 248 Squadrons, Royal Air Force.
F 285	Germany	World War II: The Marinefährprahm was sunk in the Kattegat by de Havilland Mosquito aircraft on 235 and 248 Squadrons, Royal Air Force.
F 974D	Germany	The MFP-D landing craft was sunk on this date.
Hamburg	Germany	World War II: The passenger ship struck a mine and sank in the Baltic Sea off Saßnitz (54°30′00″N 13°42′12″E). Salvaged by the Soviets in 1950, she was rebuilt as a factory ship, returning to service in 1960 as Yuri Dolgoruky.
MAL 37	Germany	World War II: The incomplete MAL 2 type landing fire support lighter was sunk at Krupp Shipyard, Rheinhausen.
Orotava	Germany	World War II: The depot ship was attacked by Soviet aircraft and sank off Sassnitz with the loss of 353 lives; she was refloated in 1945 and scrapped.
Peter von Danzig	Germany	World War II: The cargo ship struck a mine and sank in the Baltic Sea off the Swedish coast.
Sofia	Germany	World War II: The E-boat support ship struck a mine and sank off Swinemünde; she was salvaged post-war and entered Soviet service in 1946 as Nadir.
U-1302	Germany	World War II: The Type VIIC/41 submarine was depth charged and sunk in St. George's Channel (52°19′N 5°23′W) by HMCS La Hulloise, HMCS Strathadam and HMCS Thetford Mines (all Royal Canadian Navy) with the loss of all 48 crew.
V 1610 Innsbruck	Germany	World War II: The Vorpostenboot was sunk in the Kattegat by de Havilland Mosquito aircraft on 235 and 248 Squadrons, Royal Air Force.
V 1612 Gotha	Germany	World War II: The Vorpostenboot was sunk in the Kattegat by de Havilland Mosquito aircraft on 235 and 248 Squadrons, Royal Air Force.

== 8 March ==
List of shipwrecks: 8 March 1945
Ship	State	Description
Benjamin R. Milam	United States	The Liberty ship sank in the Atlantic Ocean off Baltimore, Maryland following an explosion in her engine room. She was refloated, repaired and returned to service.
C R P No 4	United States	The 33-gross register ton, 55.7-foot (17.0 m) scow sank in Prince William Sound on the south-central coast of the Territory of Alaska.
CD-69	Japan	World War II: The Type C escort ship was bombed and damaged in the South China Sea off the east coast of Hainan Island, China (19°02′N 110°56′E) by a Consolidated B-24 Liberator aircraft of the United States Fourteenth Air Force, taking a bomb down the funnel and blowing out the bottom of the ship. Three officers and 23 crewmen were killed and 30 were wounded. After emergency strengthening of the hull she was being towed to Hong Kong when she broke in two and sank on 16 March 8 nautical miles (15 km) off Hong Kong (22°00′N 113°40′E).
Lornaston	United Kingdom	World War II: Convoy ONA 289: The cargo ship (4,934 GRT, 1925) was torpedoed and sunk in the English Channel off Fécamp, Seine-Inférieure, France (50°34′40″N 0°03′20″W) by the Kriegsmarine submarine U-275. All 48 crew were rescued by HMS Holmes and HMS Palencia (both United Kingdom).
Vs 250	Germany	The KSK-2-class naval drifter/Vorpostenboot was lost on this date.
USS YF-926	United States	The self-propelled covered lighter sank in the Pacific Ocean en route to Hawaii Territory.

== 9 March ==
List of shipwrecks: 9 March 1945
Ship	State	Description
Avalanche	French Navy	World War II: The CH-101-class submarine chaser was scuttled in the Mekong River at My Tho, French Indochina by Amiral Charner (French Navy). Raised, repaired and returned to service post war.
Borbeck	Germany	World War II: The cargo ship was torpedoed and sunk in the Baltic Sea north east of Hela (55°03′N 20°45′E) by aircraft and S-303 (Soviet Navy).
Cam Rahn	French Navy	World War II: The stores vessel was scuttled at Vinh Long, French Indochina.
Commandant Bourdais	French Navy	World War II: The CH-101-class submarine chaser was sunk in the Gulf of Tonkin by Japanese aircraft. Raised, repaired and returned to service post war.
Crayssac	French Navy	World War II: The patrol vessel was scuttled at Along Bay, French Indochina.
Dalarö	Sweden	World War II: The fishing boat was sunk by a mine northwest of Hirtshals, Denmark with the loss of four of her six crew.
Francis Garnier	French Navy	World War II: The Frances Garnier-class gunboat was shelled and set on fire by Japanese forces, and then scuttled by her crew in the Mekong River at Kratie, French Indochina.
Frezouls	French Navy	World War II: The patrol vessel was scuttled at Along Bay, French Indochina.
Kaiko Maru	Japan	World War II: The auxiliary gunboat was torpedoed and sunk in the Pacific Ocean south of Honshu by USS Trepang (United States).
La Perouse	French Navy	World War II: The hydrographic vessel was scuttled at Vinh Long, French Indochina.
M-412	Germany	World War II: Granville Raid: The M 1940-class minesweeper ran aground at Granville, France, and was scuttled.
Maurice Long	French Navy	World War II: The patrol vessel was scuttled in the Mekong River at Can Tho, French Indochina.
Meteor II	Germany	World War II: The hospital ship (3,718 GRT, 1904) was being used as a troopship against the rules of war. She was bombed and sunk at Pillau, East Prussia by Soviet Air Force aircraft with the loss of 24 of the 300 people on board.
My Tho	French Navy	World War II: The Tourane-class gunboat was scuttled by Amiral Charner (French Navy) in the Mekong River at My Tho.
USS PC-564	United States	World War II: Granville Raid: The PC-461-class patrol craft was shelled and heavily damaged by Kriegsmarine Artilleriefährprahms and beached on the French coast at the Pierre de Herpin Lighthouse. She was later refloated, repaired and returned to service.
Paul Bert	French Navy	World War II: The auxiliary minesweeper was scuttled by Amiral Charner (French Navy) in the Mekong River at My Tho, French Indochina.
Robert Ley	Germany	World War II: The ocean liner was set afire during a Royal Air Force air raid on Hamburg and was burnt out. The wreck was towed to the United Kingdom in 1947 and scrapped.
Tourane	French Navy	World War II: The Tourane-class gunboat was scuttled at Donnai, French Indochina.
Tsukiyura Maru	Japan	World War II: The auxiliary gunboat was torpedoed and sunk in the Pacific Ocean south of Honshu by USS Trepang (United States).
V 6607 Wappen Von Hamburg	Germany	The Steiermark-class naval whaler was lost to an unknown cause on this date.
Vs 221	Germany	The KSK-2-class naval drifter/Vorpostenboot was sunk in a collision.
Vigilante	French Navy	World War II: The Vigilante-class gunboat was scuttled at Haiphong, French Indochina.

== 10 March ==
List of shipwrecks: 10 March 1945
Ship	State	Description
Amiral Charner	(France) Vichy French Navy	World War II: The Bougainville-class aviso was bombed and damaged by Japanese aircraft, then scuttled in the Mekong River, French Indochina.
Baron Jedburgh	United Kingdom	World War II: The cargo ship (3,656 GRT, 1936) was torpedoed and sunk in the Atlantic Ocean north east of Bahia, Brazil (10°02′S 25°00′W) by U-532 (Kriegsmarine) with the loss of one of her 59 crew. Survivors were rescued by Sandown Castle (United Kingdom) or reached land in their lifeboats.
Dokan Maru	Imperial Japanese Army	World War II: Convoy KANA-803: The Dogo Maru-class auxiliary transport was torpedoed and sunk north of Amami O-Shima (29°48′N 128°02′E) by USS Kete (United States). 27 crewmen, 23 gunners and 4 passengers were killed.
Keizan Maru	Imperial Japanese Army	World War II: Convoy KANA-803: The transport was torpedoed and sunk north of Amami O-Shima (29°25′N 127°30′E) by USS Kete (United States). 43 crewmen and 64 troops were killed. Thirty Shin'yō suicide motorboats were also lost as cargo.
Marne	(France) Vichy French Navy	World War II: The Somme-class gunboat was scuttled at Can Tho, French Indochina. Raised and scrapped 1957.
Nordfahrt	Germany	World War II: The cargo ship struck a mine and sank in the Bay of Kiel. Raised and repaired in 1949.
HNoMS Nordhav II	Royal Norwegian Navy	World War II: Convoy FS 1753: The auxiliary minesweeping trawler (425 GRT, 1913) was torpedoed and sunk in the North Sea off Dundee, Perthshire, United Kingdom (56°41′N 2°04′W) by U-714 (Kriegsmarine) with the loss of six of her 23 crew. Survivors were rescued by HNoMS Syrian (Royal Norwegian Navy).
Sanka Maru	Imperial Japanese Army	World War II: Convoy KANA-803: The transport was torpedoed and sunk north of Amami O-Shima (29°25′N 128°15′E) by USS Kete (United States). 51 crewmen and 605 troops were killed.
Seishin Maru	Japan	World War II: The Imperial Japanese Army-chartered Standard Type 1TM tanker was sunk in Tourane Bay, French Indochina in the South China Sea (16°01′N 106°10′E) by United States 5th Air Force North American B-25 Mitchell aircraft of the 500th Bomb Squadron, 345th Bomb Group.
TK-214	Soviet Navy	The A-2 (Higgins 78')-class motor torpedo boat was lost on this date.
U-275	Germany	World War II: The Type VIIC submarine struck a mine and sank in the English Channel off Newhaven, Sussex, United Kingdom (50°36′N 0°04′E) with the loss of all 48 crew.
U-681	Germany	World War II: The Type VIIC submarine was depth charged and sank in the Atlantic Ocean west of the Isles of Scilly, United Kingdom (49°52′N 6°38′W) by a Consolidated B-24 Liberator aircraft of the United States Navy with the loss of eleven of her 49 crew.
UJ 303	Germany	The KSK-2-class naval drifter/submarine chaser was wrecked on this date.

== 11 March ==
List of shipwrecks: 11 March 1945
Ship	State	Description
Arion	Germany	World War II: The cargo ship was damaged in an Allied air raid on Hamburg. She was beached at Blankenese with her back broken. The bow section was raised in 1947–48. A new stern section was built and she entered West German service.
Borbeck	Germany	World War II: The cargo ship was sunk in the Baltic Sea off Hela, Pomerania by Soviet Douglas A-20 Havoc aircraft.
Carl	Germany	World War II: The cargo ship was sunk in an Allied air raid on Hamburg.
Electra	Germany	World War II: The cargo ship was bombed and sunk by Allied aircraft at Hamburg.
F 522C2	Germany	The MFP-C2 landing craft was sunk on this date.
Gotenhafen	Germany	World War II: The cargo ship was severely damaged by Allied aircraft at Hamburg.
H 13 Cambronne	Germany	World War II: The transport ship was sunk in an Allied air raid on Hamburg. She was refloated in October 1950 and scrapped the next year.
M 266	Germany	World War II: The Type 1940 minesweeper was bombed and sunk by aircraft at Kiel, Schleswig-Holstein. Later scrapped.
M 804	Germany	World War II: The Type 1943 minesweeper was bombed and sunk by aircraft at Mönkeberg, Schleswig-Holstein.
M 805	Germany	World War II: The Type 1943 minesweeper was bombed and sunk by aircraft at Heikendorf, Schleswig-Holstein.
M 5202	Germany	World War II: The Type 1935 minesweeper was sunk by British rocket-armed aircraft off Fedjefjord, Norway.
Orion	Germany	World War II: The tanker (8,064 GRT, 1936) was sunk in an Allied air raid at Hamburg. Raised post-war, repaired and returned to service for her Norwegian owners.
Shori Maru	Japan	World War II: The transport ship was torpedoed and sunk in the East China Sea by USS Segundo (United States).
U-682	Germany	World War II: The Type VIIC submarine was destroyed at Hamburg in an American air raid.
U-1201	Germany	World War II: The Type VIIC submarine was severely damaged at Hamburg in an American air raid. She was consequently scuttled on 3 May.
Wayo Maru	Japan	World War II: The Peacetime Standard Type C auxiliary transport (water tanker) (2,726 GRT, 1941) was bombed and sunk 40 miles (64 km) south west of Macao (21°31′N 112°25′E) by a Martin PBM Mariner aircraft of the United States Navy. Eighteen crewmen were killed.

== 12 March ==
List of shipwrecks: 12 March 1945
Ship	State	Description
Andros	Germany	World War II: The cargo ship was sunk in an American air raid on Swinemünde.
USS Bass	United States Navy	The decommissioned Barracuda-class submarine was sunk by a Mark 24 Fido acoustic homing torpedo southeast of Block Island off the coast of Rhode Island in 155 feet (47 m) of water for use as a sonar target.
Capitaine Coulon	(France) Vichy French Navy	World War II: The patrol vessel was scuttled at Vinh Long, French Indochina.
Cordillera	Germany	World War II: The transport ship was sunk in an American air raid on Swinemünde. She was refloated on 7 June 1949, repaired and entered Soviet service in 1952 as Russ.
F 1065	Germany	World War II: The MFP-DM landing craft/minelayer was sunk in a collision, or by Soviet aircraft, in the Baltic.
Gerrit Fritzen	Germany	World War II: The cargo ship was bombed and sunk in the Baltic Sea off Fehmarn by Soviet Douglas A-20 Havoc aircraft. The wreck has been located in 2023.
Heiligenhafen	Germany	World War II: The cargo ship was sunk in an American air raid on Swinemünde.
Hilde	Germany	World War II: The cargo ship was sunk in an American air raid on Swinemünde.
Hinode Maru No. 1 GO	Japan	World War II: The auxiliary guard ship was sunk by United States aircraft east of the Ryukyus (26°54′N 131°38′E).
Jasmund	Germany	World War II: The cargo ship was sunk in an American air raid on Swinemünde.
KFK 677, KFK 679, KFK 680, KFK 683, KFK 684, KFK 685, KFK 686, KFK 687, KFK 688, KFK 689, KFK 690, KFK 691, KFK 692, KFK 693, KFK 694, KFK 695, KFK 696, KFK 697, KFK 698 and KFK 699	Germany	World War II: The incomplete KSK-class naval trawlers were sunk in an American air raid on Swinemünde at the Burmester Shipyard.
Kastelac	Kingdom of Yugoslavia	World War II: The steamer and four barges were sunk in the Danube River by German assault craft.
M 266	Germany	World War II: The minesweeper was sunk in an American air raid on Kiel, Schleswig-Holstein.
M 804	Germany	World War II: The minesweeper was sunk in an American air raid on Kiel.
M 805	Germany	World War II: The minesweeper was sunk in an American air raid on Kiel.
M 3137	Germany	World War II: The KSK-2-class naval drifter/minesweeper was bombed and sunk in the Baltic Sea off Kolberg, Pomerania by Soviet aircraft.
MRS-4 Paris	Germany	World War II: The depot ship (1,753 GRT, 1922) was torpedoed and sunk off the Kvaløytå Lighthouse, Haugesund, Norway (59°25′N 5°15′E) by HNoMS MTB-711 (Royal Norwegian Navy) with the loss of 86 of her 156 crew.
Mutsusho Maru No. 2 GO	Japan	The auxiliary patrol ship was lost on this date.
R-243	Germany	World War II: The Type R-218 minesweeper was sunk off Swinemünde by Soviet aircraft, or was sunk in an American air raid on Swinemünde.
R-272, R-273, R-274, R-275 and R-276	Germany	World War II: The Type R-218 minesweepers were destroyed in an American air raid on Swinemünde.
Ravenbsurg	Germany	World War II: The cargo ship struck a mine and sank in the Baltic Sea off Swinemünde, Pomerania.
Rolandseck	Germany	World War II: The troop ship was sunk in an air attack near Skagen, Denmark.
Sperrbrecher 18	Germany	World War II: The sperrbrecher was severely damaged in an American air raid on Hamburg. She was declared a constructive total loss and was scrapped in 1948–49.
Tolima	Germany	World War II: The cargo ship was sunk in an American air raid on Swinemünde.
U-260	Germany	World War II: The Type VIIC submarine struck a mine and sank in the Atlantic Ocean south of Ireland. All 48 crew survived.
U-2547	Germany	World War II: The Type XXI submarine was severely damaged in an American air raid on Hamburg. Construction was abandoned.
UJ 303	Germany	World War II: The submarine chaser was sunk by Soviet aircraft in the Baltic Sea.
UJ 320	Germany	World War II: The KSK-2-class naval drifter/submarine chaser was bombed by Soviet Douglas A-20 Havoc aircraft and sank next day.
UJ 321	Germany	The KSK-2-class naval drifter/submarine chaser was destroyed on this date.
V 315 Bris	Germany	World War II: The Bris-class naval trawler/Vorpostenboot was damaged by Soviet Douglas A-20 Havoc aircraft, later collided with Hendrik Fisser 7 (Germany) and sank in the Baltic Sea off Großendorf, Reichsgau Danzig-West Prussia (55°01′35″N 18°21′43″E).
V 2023 Karlsburg	Germany	World War II: The Vorposteboot was sunk in an American air raid on Swinemünde.

== 13 March ==
List of shipwrecks: 13 March 1945
Ship	State	Description
CD-66	Japan	World War II: The Type D escort ship was sunk in the South China Sea east of Swatow, China (23°30′N 117°10′E) by North American B-25 Mitchell aircraft of the 341st Bomb Group, United States Fourteenth Air Force. One hundred and seventy-five crewmen were killed.
Keihin Maru	Japan	World War II: The auxiliary submarine chaser was torpedoed and sunk in the Java Sea by USS Bream (United States).
Masashima Maru	Japan	World War II: The transport was sunk in the South China Sea east of Swatow (23°30′N 117°10′E) by Consolidated B-24 Liberator aircraft of the United States Fifth Air Force. Fifteen crewmen, nineteen guards and eight passengers were killed.
M-10	Germany	World War II: The Type 1935 minesweeper was sunk near Lorient by American artillery fire.
Russell H. Crittenden	United States	The Liberty ship was wrecked on the coast of New Guinea (5°55′S 149°10′E).
HMS Sealion	United Kingdom	The S-class submarine was scuttled as an ASDIC target off the Isle of Arran, Scotland. (Look 03/03/1945)
Taber Park	United Kingdom	World War II: The Park ship (2,878 GRT, 1944) was torpedoed and sunk in the North Sea (52°22′N 1°53′E) by a Kriegsmarine midget submarine.
UJ 1414 Treff I	Germany	World War II: The naval whaler/auxiliary submarine chaser was shelled and sunk at Lorient, Morbihan, France by Allied shore-based artillery.

== 14 March ==
List of shipwrecks: 14 March 1945
Ship	State	Description
Elandsfontein	Germany	World War II: The incomplete cargo ship was shelled by Soviet artillery and sank in the Vistula. She was subsequently salvaged and laid up at Danzig. Returned to the Netherlands in 1947 and entered Dutch service in 1950 as Jagersfontein.
Esso Washington	United States	The T2 tanker was wrecked near Eniwetok Atoll, Marshall Islands. She was on a voyage from San Pedro to the Eniwetok Atoll.
Hugo Zeye	Germany	World War II: The training ship struck a mine and sank in the Baltic Sea off Fehmarn with the loss of 5 lives.
KEMTShch-218	Soviet Navy	The MSV-38-class river minesweeping boat was sunk on this date.
Kaiko Maru	Japan	The auxiliary patrol ship was lost on this date.
Magne	Sweden	World War II: The cargo ship was torpedoed and sunk in the North Sea off St Abb's Head, Berwickshire, United Kingdom (55°52′N 1°59′W) by U-714 (Kriegsmarine) with the loss of ten of her 21 crew. Survivors were rescued by Acclivity (United Kingdom).
10 Shin'yō suicide motorboats	Japan	World War II: The Shin'yō-class suicide motorboats were bombed and sunk/destroyed by a Consolidated B-24 Liberator aircraft at Kin Bay, Okinawa. 18 people were killed.
T3	Germany	World War II: The Type 35 torpedo boat struck a mine and sank in the Baltic Sea off Hela, Danzig-West Prussia (54°39′N 18°47′E) with the loss of 20 lives.
T5	Germany	World War II: The Type 35 torpedo boat struck a mine and sank in the Baltic Sea off Hela, Danzig-West Prussia (54°39′N 18°47′E) with the loss of 300 lives.
U-714	Germany	World War II: The Type VIIC submarine was depth charged and sunk in the North Sea off Eyemouth, Berwickshire, United Kingdom (55°57′N 1°57′W) by HMSAS Natal (South African Navy) and HMS Wivern (United Kingdom) with the loss of all 50 crew.
U-1021	Germany	World War II: The Type VIIC/41 submarine struck a mine and sank in the Bristol Channel off Newquay, Cornwall, United Kingdom (50°39′48″N 5°05′40″W) with the loss of all 43 crew.
Yatsushiro Maru	Japan	World War II: Convoy SAYU-02: The auxiliary submarine chaser was lost on this date.

== 15 March ==
List of shipwrecks: 15 March 1945
Ship	State	Description
Castor	Germany	World War II: The icebreaker struck a mine and sank in the Baltic Sea off Warnemünde, Pomerania.
USS Lancetfish	United States	USS Lancetfish, 23 March 1945 The Balao-class submarine sank at pier eight, Boston Navy Yard, Boston, Massachusetts without loss of life. The immediate cause of sinking was the opening of the breech door of a torpedo tube while the outer door was open and the interlock system was not operating. She was raised on 23 March but was decommissioned the next day, subsequently being allocated in uncompleted condition to the Atlantic Reserve Fleet. She was never completed and was finally scrapped in 1959.
Wakamiya Maru	Japan	The Wakamiya Maru-class auxiliary netlayer (500 GRT, 1937) stranded off Kirun coast near the Qian Lu lighthouse.

== 16 March ==
List of shipwrecks: 16 March 1945
Ship	State	Description
Inger Toft	United Kingdom	World War II: Convoy RU 156: The cargo ship (2,190 GRT, 1920) was torpedoed and sunk in the Atlantic Ocean (57°25′N 6°52′W) by U-722 (Kriegsmarine). All 30 crew were rescued by HMS Grenadier (United Kingdom).
R-14	Germany	World War II: The Type R-2 minesweeper was sunk at Monfalcone, Friuli-Venezia Giulia, Italy by Allied aircraft.
RD 115	Germany	The Type RD 101 minesweeper was sunk on this date.
Sibigo	Netherlands	The cargo ship was lost in a tropical cyclone in the Coral Sea off Port Douglas, Queensland, Australia with thirteen of 85 crew members rescued.
U-367	Germany	World War II: The Type VIIC submarine struck a mine and sank in the Baltic Sea near Hela (54°25′N 18°50′E) with the loss of all 50 crew.
UIT-6	Germany	World War II: The submarine was sunk in an Allied air raid on Monfalcone.
UJ-1105 Wilhelm Loh	Germany	World War II: The naval trawler/submarine chaser was bombed and sunk by Allied aircraft in the Skagerrak.

== 17 March ==
List of shipwrecks: 17 March 1945
Ship	State	Description
Daffodil	United Kingdom	World War II: The landing craft carrier (2,672 GRT, 1917) hit a mine off Dieppe and sank the next morning; nine crewmen were killed.
Ellringon (or Ellrington)	United States	The 22-gross register ton, 47.6-foot (14.5 m) fishing vessel was destroyed by fire at Cordova, Territory of Alaska.
HMCS Guysborough	Royal Canadian Navy	World War II: The Bangor-class minesweeper (672/875 t, 1942) was torpedoed and sunk in the Bay of Biscay by the submarine U-868 (Kriegsmarine) with the loss of 51 of her crew. About 40 survivors were rescued by the frigate HMS Inglis (United Kingdom).
Ikomasan Maru	Japan	World War II: Convoy TAMO-49:The cargo ship was damaged in the South China Sea off Fuchow, China, by the submarine USS Spot (United States) and was beached on Matsu (25°58′N 119°58′E) off the coast of China. Seven passengers, four gunners, and six crew were lost. Later in the day she was bombed by United States Army Air Forces North American B-25 Mitchell aircraft, killing another five crewmen. The beached ship was bombed again on 26 March by U.S. Army Air Forces Consolidated B-24 Liberator aircraft and destroyed.
Iris	Germany	World War II: The cargo ship (3,323 GRT, 1921) was bombed and sunk at Ålesund, Norway by de Havilland Mosquito aircraft of 143, 235, 248, and 333 Squadrons, Royal Air Force.
Log	Norway	World War II: The cargo ship (1,560 GRT, 1931) was bombed and sunk at Ålesund, Norway, by de Havilland Mosquito aircraft of 143, 235, 248, and 333 Squadrons, Royal Air Force.
Margarethe Cords	Germany	World War II: The cargo ship was torpedoed and sunk in the Baltic Sea, south of Bornholm, Denmark (54°48′N 15°00′E), by the submarine K-53 (Soviet Navy) with the loss of two lives.
Nanking Maru	Empire of Japan	World War II: Convoy TAMO-49: The Peking Maru-class auxiliary transport ship was sunk in the South China Sea off Fuchow (25°33′N 120°10′E), China, by the submarine USS Spot (United States). All 411 passengers, 32 gunners, and 60 crew were lost.
Remagen	Germany	World War II: The cargo ship (1,830 GRT, 1914) was bombed and sunk off Ålesund, Norway, by de Havilland Mosquito aircraft of 143, 235, 248, and 333 Squadrons, Royal Air Force.
Rixhöft	Germany	World War II: The cargo ship struck a mine and sank in the Baltic Sea off Warnemünde, Pomerania, Germany.
HTMS Samui	Thailand	World War II: The coastal tanker was torpedoed and sunk in the Gulf of Siam off Kuala Terengganu, Malaya (05°18′N 103°23′E) by the submarine USS Sealion (United States).

== 18 March ==
List of shipwrecks: 18 March 1945
Ship	State	Description
Brünhilde	Germany	World War II: The Hansa A Type cargo ship was severely damaged by the explosion of two mines off Warnemünde.
Daito Maru No. 5	Japan	World War II: The fishing trawler was torpedoed and sunk in the Yellow Sea by USS Balao (United States).
Kamo Maru	Japan	World War II: Convoy KATA-504: The auxiliary sailing ship was sunk in the East China Sea off Noma Misaki (31°24′N 130°07′E) by United States Navy aircraft from Task Force 58.
Kenyo Maru	Japan	World War II: Convoy KATA-504: The transport was sunk in the East China Sea off Noma Misaki (31°24′N 130°07′E) by United States Navy aircraft from Task Force 58. Five crewmen and 98 passengers were killed.
HMS LCP(L) 764	United Kingdom	The landing craft personnel (large) (5.9/8.2 t, 1943) was lost in Home Waters.
Nansei Maru No. 1	Japan	World War II: Convoy KATA-504: The tanker was sunk in the East China Sea off Noma Misaki (31°24′N 130°07′E) by United States Navy aircraft from Task Force 58.
Orion	Netherlands	World War II: The cargo ship struck a mine and sank, or was torpedoed and sunk by Soviet Douglas A-20 Havoc aircraft in the Gulf of Danzig.
R-227	Germany	World War II: The Type R-218 minesweeper was sunk north of Ustka, Pomerania by Soviet Douglas A-20 Havoc aircraft.
Shoho Maru No. 1 GO	Japan	The auxiliary patrol ship was lost on this date.
T-18	Japan	World War II: The No.1-class landing ship was torpedoed and sunk in the East China Sea north north west of Aguni Island, Ryukyu Islands (26°33′N 127°11′E) by USS Springer (United States). Lost with all 225 crew.
TA24	Germany	World War II: The torpedo boat was sunk in the Ligurian Sea north west of Corsica, France by HMS Lookout and HMS Meteor (both United Kingdom).
TA29	Germany	World War II: The Ariete-class torpedo boat was sunk in the Ligurian Sea west of Corsica by HMS Lookout and HMS Meteor (both United Kingdom).
Tenjin Maru	Japan	World War II: Convoy KATA-504: The auxiliary sailing ship was sunk in the East China Sea off Noma Misaki (31°24′N 130°07′E) by United States Navy aircraft from Task Force 58.
TKA-66	Soviet Navy	World War II: The D-5-class motor torpedo boat was shelled and sunk in the Gulf of Gdansk by German Schnellboots.
Tsukushi Maru No.3	Japan	World War II: Convoy KANA-304: The cargo ship was torpedoed and sunk in the Pacific Ocean off the Ryukyu Islands by USS Trigger (United States).
U-866	Germany	World War II: The Type IXC/40 submarine was depth charged and sunk in the Atlantic Ocean (43°18′N 61°08′W) by USS Lowe, USS Menges, USS Mosley and USS Pride (all United States) with the loss of all 55 crew.
Unknown submarine	Japan	World War II: The midget submarine was bombed and sunk in Davao Gulf, Philippines by Lockheed PV-1 Ventura aircraft.
Vs 1014	Germany	The Vorpostenboot, a former UZ 1-class submarine chaser, was lost on this date.

== 19 March ==
List of shipwrecks: 19 March 1945
Ship	State	Description
Astrida	Belgium	The cargo liner foundered in the Atlantic Ocean 58 nautical miles (107 km) south east of Port Elizabeth, South Africa (34°35′S 26°50′E) during a hurricane with the loss of 88 passengers and crew. There were 29 survivors.
Crichtoun	United Kingdom	World War II: Convoy FS 1759: The cargo ship (1,097 GRT, 1920) was torpedoed and sunk in the North Sea off Lowestoft, Suffolk by a Kriegsmarine Schnellboot. 20 crew and 1 gunner were killed.
Daito Maru No. 1	Japan	World War II: The fishing trawler was torpedoed and sunk in the Yellow Sea by USS Balao (United States).
Empire Blessing	United Kingdom	World War II: The cargo ship (7,062 GRT, 1944) struck a mine and sank in the Scheldt, Belgium. There were no casualties.
Hakozaki Maru	Japan	World War II: Convoy MOTA-43: The Hakone Maru-class auxiliary transport (10,413 GRT 1922) was torpedoed and sunk in the East China Sea 225 miles (362 km) north northeast of Shanghai (33°07′N 122°05′E) by USS Balao (United States). A total of 928 passengers, 51 gunners and 139 crewmen were lost. One hundred and thirty survivors were rescued by CD-102 and Chikubu (both Japan).
Kiyo Maru	Japan	Convoy SAYU-02: The auxiliary submarine chaser was lost on this date.
Ōyodo	Japan	World War II: The Ōyodo-class cruiser was bombed and damaged by carrier aircraft from Task Force 58 at Kure Naval arsenal. She was beached at Etajima. 53 crew were killed. The cruiser was refloated and drydocked on 23 March.
Rogate	United Kingdom	World War II: Convoy FS 1759: The cargo ship (2,871 GRT, 1944) was torpedoed and sunk in the North Sea off Lowestoft by a Kriegsmarine Schnellboot. One crew member was killed. She was on a voyage from Sunderland, County Durham to London.
Samselbu	United Kingdom	World War II: The Liberty ship (7,253 GRT, 1944) struck a mine and sank in the North Sea off the coast of Belgium (51°23′N 3°06′E).
Sarawak Maru	Japan	World War II: Convoy HI-88J: The Standard Wartime Type 1TM tanker struck a mine in the South China Sea 10 nautical miles (19 km) north of the Horsburgh Lighthouse, Singapore. She was beached on Bintan Island (01°25′N 104°36′E). On 21 March 1945 she rolled to port and sank.
Sirius	Germany	World War II: The cargo ship was torpedoed and sunk in the Norwegian Sea off Namsos, Norway by HMS Venturer (Royal Navy).
Suma	Japan	World War II: The Insect-class gunboat was sunk on the Yangtze River 50 nautical miles (93 km; 58 mi) north of Kiangyin, China (32°00′N 120°00′E) by a mine. Eight crewmen were lost.
Vs 301 Karl Bergh	Germany	The Vorpostenboot was lost on this date.

== 20 March ==
List of shipwrecks: 20 March 1945
Ship	State	Description
BK-7	Soviet Union	World War II: The Project 1125-class armored motor gunboat was sunk near Esztergom while supporting a landing operation.
Egeria	Germany	World War II: The coaster was sunk in an American air raid on Hamburg.
Hadley F. Brown	United States	World War II: The Liberty ship struck a mine off Ostend, West Flanders, Belgium and was damaged. She was on a voyage from Barry, Glamorgan, United Kingdom to Ghent, East Flanders, Belgium. She was towed in to Antwerp, Belgium. Subsequently repaired and returned to service.
Hakuyo Maru	Japan	World War II: The patrol boat was torpedoed and sunk by the U.S. Navy submarine USS Pollack 50 kilometres (31 mi) northeast of Torishima at (30°40′N 140°42′E)
Horace Bushnell	United States	World War II: Convoy JW 65: The Liberty ship was torpedoed and damaged in the Barents Sea 25 nautical miles (46 km) north east of the North Kilden Lighthouse, Soviet Union (69°23′N 35°17′E) by the Kriegsmarine submarine U-995 with the loss of five of her 69 crew. Survivors were rescued by the British warship HMS Orwell. Horace Bushnell was beached at Teriberski and abandoned as a constructive total loss. Salvaged in 1949, repaired and entered Soviet service as Pamyati Kirova.
Hosen Maru	Japan	World War II: Convoy HI-88I: The tanker was torpedoed and sunk in the South China Sea south of Cam Rahn Bay, French Indochina (11°18′N 108°57′E) by the U.S. Navy submarine USS Blenny. A total of 170 passengers, eight gunners, and eighteen crewmen were killed.
Isar	Germany	World War II: The coaster was sunk in a U.S. air raid on Hamburg.
Kainan Maru	Japan	World War II: Convoy HI-88I: The auxiliary submarine chaser was torpedoed and sunk in the South China Sea 50 nautical miles (93 km) south of Cam Rahn Bay (12°00′N 109°17′E) by the U.S. Navy submarine USS Baya.
HMS Lapwing	United Kingdom	World War II: Convoy JW 65: The Black Swan-class sloop (1,350/1,950 t, 1944) was torpedoed and sunk in the Kola Inlet (69°29′N 33°44′E) by the Kriegsmarine submarine U-968 with the loss of 168 of her 229 crew. Survivors were rescued by HMS Savage (United Kingdom).
HMS LST-80	United Kingdom	World War II: The landing ship tank Mk.2 (1,625/4,080 t, 1943) was sunk by a mine in the North Sea off Ostend, West Flanders, Belgium with the loss of four crew.
M15, M18, and M19	Germany	World War II: The Type 1935 minesweepers were sunk in a U.S. air raid on Kiel, Schleswig-Holstein.
M-16	Germany	World War II: The Type 1935 minesweeper was bombed and sunk at Kiel; scuttled on 18 May 1945.
M-522	Germany	World War II: The Type 1916 minesweeper was bombed and sunk by U.S. warplanes at Kiel.
Nanshin Maru No. 21	Japan	World War II: Convoy HI-88I: The tanker was torpedoed and sunk in the South China Sea south of Cam Rahn Bay (11°18′N 108°57′E) by USS Blenny (United States). Fourteen crewmen were killed.
Nordwest	Germany	World War II: The coaster was sunk in a U.S. air raid on Hamburg.
Thomas Donaldson	United States	World War II: Convoy JW 64: The Liberty ship was torpedoed and damaged in the Barents Sea off Murmansk, Soviet Union (69°26′N 33°44′E) by the Kriegsmarine submarine U-968 with the loss of four of her 69 crew. Survivors were rescued by the British warships HMS Bamborough Castle, HMS Honeysuckle and HMS Oxlip. Thomas Donaldson was taken in tow but foundered off Kilden Island (68°26′30″N 33°44′20″E).
U-2250	Germany	World War II: The submarine was destroyed in a U.S. air raid on Hamburg while under construction.
Usambara	Germany	World War II: The accommodation ship was severely damaged in a U.S. air raid on Stettin. She was consequently scuttled off Kranichwerder on 31 March.
Venus	Germany	World War II: The target ship was bombed and sunk at Hamburg by U.S. warplanes. Raised post-war, repaired and returned to Norwegian service in May 1948.
Yamakuni Maru	Japan	World War II: The fishing vessel was torpedoed and sunk in the South China Sea by the U.S. Navy submarine USS Blenny.

== 21 March ==
List of shipwrecks: 21 March 1945
Ship	State	Description
CH-33	Japan	World War II: The No.13-class submarine chaser was sunk off Nha Trang, French Indochina in the South China Sea (12°30′N 109°14′E) by North American B-25 Mitchell aircraft of the 345th Bomb Group, United States Fifth Air Force. The captain and seven crewmen were killed. There were 222 wounded.
Fushimi Maru No. 2	Japan	World War II: The cargo ship was sunk in the South China Sea off Nha Trang, French Indochina (12°30′N 109°14′E) by North American B-25 Mitchell aircraft of the 345th Bomb Group, United States Fifth Air Force. Three crewmen and eleven others were killed.
BK-131 Geroy Sovetskogo Soyuza Filchenkov	Soviet Navy	World War II: The Project 1125-class armored motor gunboat was sunk by German artillery on the Danube near Esztergom.
James Eagan Layne	United States	World War II: Convoy BTC 103: The Liberty ship was torpedoed and damaged in the English Channel off Plymouth, Devon, United Kingdom (50°13′N 4°05′W) by U-399 (Kriegsmarine). She was beached at Whitesand Bay but declared a constructive total loss. All 69 crew survived.
John R. Park	United States	World War II: Convoy TBC 102: The Liberty ship was torpedoed and sunk in the Atlantic Ocean 9 nautical miles (17 km) off Lizard Head, Cornwall, United Kingdom (49°56′N 5°26′W) by U-1195 (Kriegsmarine). All 75 crew were rescued by American Press (United States) and a Royal Air Force rescue launch.
KT-220	Soviet Navy	World War II: The K-18-class river minesweeping launch was sunk by German artillery on the Danube near Esztergom.
M 3827 Saturnus	Germany	World War II: The naval drifter/minesweeper struck a mine and sank in the Øresund.
Motoyama Maru No. 1	Japan	World War II: The cargo ship (a.k.a. Genzan Maru No. 1) was sunk in the South China Sea off Nha Trang (12°30′N 109°14′E) North American B-25 Mitchell aircraft of the 345th Bomb Group, United States Fifth Air Force. Four crewmen were killed.
Renate	Germany	World War II: The cargo ship struck a mine and sank in the Stettin Lagoon with the loss of 52 lives.
S181	Germany	World War II: The Type 1939/40 Schnellboot was sunk in the North Sea off Den Helder, North Holland, Netherlands by Bristol Beaufighter aircraft of 236 Squadron, Royal Air Force. 14 crew were killed.
S 203	Germany	World War II: The Type 1939/40 Schnellboot was damaged in an air attack and then was sunk by a mine.
TA42	Germany	World War II: The Ariete-class torpedo boat was sunk in an Allied air raid on Venice, Italy.
Tateishi	Japan	World War II: The minelayer, originally built as a Hashima-class cable layer, was sunk in the South China Sea off Nha Trang (11°50′N 109°18′E) by North American B-25 Mitchell aircraft of the 345th Bomb Group, United States Fifth Air Force.
Z51	Germany	World War II: The incomplete Type 1942 destroyer was sunk in a British air raid on Bremen.

== 22 March ==
List of shipwrecks: 22 March 1945
Ship	State	Description
Empire Kingsley	United Kingdom	World War II: Convoy TBC 103: The cargo ship (6,996 GRT, 1941) was torpedoed and sunk in the Atlantic Ocean (50°08′N 5°51′W) by U-315 (Kriegsmarine) with the loss of eight of her 57 crew. Survivors were rescued by HMT Fir (United Kingdom).
Frankfurt	Germany	World War II: The cargo ship sunk by Soviet Douglas A-20 Havoc aircraft or struck a mine and sank in the Baltic Sea off the Hel Peninsula, Pomerania.
HMMTB 655	United Kingdom	World War II: The Fairmile D motor torpedo boat (90/107 t, 1943) struck a mine and sank in the Adriatic Sea. 7 crew were killed and another died of wounds.
Mendoza	Germany	World War II: The cargo ship was sunk in the Baltic Sea off Pillau, East Prussia, Germany by Soviet Ilyushin Il-2 aircraft.
R 239	Germany	World War II: The Type R-218 minesweeper was sunk in a British air raid on Hamburg.
Tozan Maru	Japan	World War II: The cargo ship struck a mine and sank off Moji.
Unknown submarine	Japan	World War II: The midget submarine was rocketed and sunk at dock in Cebu City, Philippines by two Lockheed PV-1 Ventura aircraft.
V 326	Germany	World War II: The patrol ship was sunk by Soviet Douglas A-20 Havoc aircraft in the Baltic Sea.
USS YF-724 and USS YF-725	United States	The self-propelled covered lighters were lost off the Farallon Islands in heavy weather.

== 23 March ==
List of shipwrecks: 23 March 1945
Ship	State	Description
Charles D. McIver	United States	World War II: Convoy ATM 100: The Liberty ship was torpedoed and sunk in the North Sea off Ostend, West Flanders, Belgium (51°23′N 3°05′E) by U-5366 (Kriegsmarine).
Doryo Maru	Japan	World War II: The transport ship was torpedoed and sunk in the East China Sea north of Naha, Okinawa, by USS Spadefish (United States). 262 Navy passengers, 39 crewmen and 21 guards were killed. 28 Shin'yō-class suicide motorboats lost as cargo.
Eleftheria	Greece	World War II: The Liberty ship struck a mine and was damaged in the North Sea off Ostend. She was beached but broke in two. The wreck was dispersed in 1952.
Gneisenau	Germany	World War II: The incompletely refurbished Scharnhorst-class battleship was sunk as a blockship in Gdynia harbor, Poland. She was later refloated and scrapped.
Kachosan Maru	Imperial Japanese Army	World War II: Convoy KANA-101: The Kachosan Maru-class auxiliary transport was bombed and sunk in the East China Sea off Sotsukozaki, Amami Ōshima by United States Navy Grumman F6F Hellcat aircraft. Depending on the sources, 204, 212 or 1,422 crew, gunners and troops were killed.
Lysaker	Norway	World War II: The coaster (898 GRT, 1919) was bombed and sunk at Sandshamn, Norway by de Havilland Mosquito aircraft of 143, 235 and 249 Squadrons, Royal Air Force.
M 296	Germany	World War II: The incomplete M 1940-class minesweeper was destroyed on the stocks at Memel, East Prussia.
M 3138	Germany	World War II: The minesweeper struck a mine and sank in the Baltic Sea off Pillau, East Prussia.
HMS MTB 705	United Kingdom	World War II: The Fairmile D motor torpedo boat (90/107 t, 1943) struck a mine and sank in approach to Maknare Channel, Adriatic Sea. Two crew were killed and one died of wounds.
Ro-41	Japan	World War II: The Kaichū VII type submarine was depth charged, rammed and sunk in the Pacific Ocean (22°57′N 132°19′E) by USS Haggard (United States) with all 82 crew.
Robert Muller VII	Germany	World War II: The cargo ship was sunk by a mine in the Skagerrak off Nidingen.
USS S-21	United States	The decommissioned S-class submarine was sunk as a target in 150 feet (46 m) of water in the Atlantic Ocean off Cape Elizabeth, Maine.
U-1003	Germany	World War II: The Type VIIC/41 submarine attempted to ram HMCS New Glasgow (Royal Canadian Navy) in the Atlantic Ocean but was severely damaged in the process. She was scuttled three days later (55°25′N 6°53′W) with the loss of seventeen of her 48 crew. Survivors were rescued by HMCS Thetford Mines (Royal Canadian Navy).
Unknown submarine	Japan	World War II: The Type C midget submarine was sunk by aircraft from USS Essex (United States) in Unten Bay, Okinawa.
Utviken	Norway	World War II: The cargo ship (3,502 GRT, 1942) struck a mine and sank in the Kattegat off Sjællands Odde, Denmark.
V 2022 Emil Colsmann	Germany	World War II: The Vorpostenboot was torpedoed and sunk north of Stolpmünde (55°21′N 16°55′E) by L-21 (Soviet Navy) with the loss of 76 lives.

== 24 March ==
List of shipwrecks: 24 March 1945
Ship	State	Description
Butjadingen	Germany	World War II: The cable ship was sunk by aircraft off Bornholm in the Baltic Sea.
CD-68	Japan	World War II: Convoy KANA-304: The Type C escort ship was sunk in the East China Sea 200 nautical miles (370 km) north west of Okinawa (30°00′N 126°36′E) by United States Navy aircraft from Task Force 58.
Chitose Maru	Japan	World War II: Convoy KANA-304: The auxiliary minesweeper was sunk in the East China Sea 200 nautical miles (370 km) north west of Okinawa (28°25′N 124°32′E) by United States Navy aircraft from Task Force 58. Five crew and many passengers were killed.
Erni	Germany	World War II: The tug was torpedoed and sunk in the Baltic Sea by L-21 (Soviet Navy).
Juno	Germany	World War II: The cargo ship was sunk in an Allied air raid on Wilhelmshaven.
Kaijo Maru	Japan	World War II: Convoy KANA-304: The cargo ship was sunk in the East China Sea 200 nautical miles (370 km) southeast of Shanghai, China (28°25′N 124°32′E) by United States Navy aircraft from Task Force 58 with the loss of 668 lives.
Koshu Maru	Imperial Japanese Army	World War II: Convoy KANA-304: The Koshu Maru-class auxiliary transport was sunk in the East China Sea 200 nautical miles (370 km) southeast of Shanghai, China (30°25′N 126°55′E) by United States Navy aircraft from Task Force 58 with the loss of 388 lives.
Monbaldo	Germany	World War II: The cargo ship was bombed and sunk by aircraft at Stettin, Pomerania. Raised in 1950–55 and taken into Soviet service as Kaliningrad until scrapped in 1969.
Sarp	Norway	World War II: The coaster (1,116 GRT, 1916) was bombed and damaged at Egersund, Norway in an Allied air raid. She was beached on fire and was later condemned as a total loss. Two men, the captain and the pilot, were killed. She was raised in 1945 and converted as a barge.
Seki Maru	Japan	World War II: Convoy KANA-304: The auxiliary minesweeper was sunk in the East China Sea 200 nautical miles (370 km) northwest of Okinawa (29°12′N 125°13′E) by American Consolidated B-24 Liberator aircraft.
Shonan Maru No. 16	Japan	World War II: Convoy KANA-304: The auxiliary minesweeper was sunk in the East China Sea 200 nautical miles (370 km) southeast of Shanghai, China (28°25′N 124°32′E) by United States Navy aircraft from Task Force 58.
Soka Maru	Japan	World War II: Convoy KANA-304: The cargo ship was sunk in the East China Sea 200 nautical miles (370 km) south east of Shanghai, China (28°25′N 124°32′E) by United States Navy aircraft from Task Force 58 with the loss of 276 lives.
Thetis	Germany	World War II: The cargo ship was bombed and sunk at Egersund, Norway in an Allied air raid. She was raised in 1947, repaired and entered Norwegian service as Strømsøy.
Tomozuru	Japan	World War II: Convoy KANA-304: The Chidori-class torpedo boat was sunk in the East China Sea 200 nautical miles (370 km) south east of Shanghai, China (28°25′N 124°32′E) by United States Navy aircraft from Task Force 58.
Tugela	Germany	World War II: The cargo ship (5,559 GRT, 1921) struck a mine and sank in the North Sea off Florø, Norway.
UJ-1435	Germany	World War II: The submarine chaser was bombed and sunk at Egersund in an Allied air raid. She was raised post-war.
Weser	Germany	World War II: The cargo ship was sunk in an air raid at Neufahrwasser, Danzig, Germany.

== 25 March ==
List of shipwrecks: 25 March 1945
Ship	State	Description
AF 120	Germany	World War II: The MFP-D Type Artilleriefährprahm was scuttled near Hanau, Germany.
Africana	Germany	World War II: The cargo ship was scuttled at Danzig.
CH-34	Japan	World War II: The No.28-class submarine chaser was shelled and sunk in the Andaman Sea east of Khota Andaman, about 135 nautical miles (250 km; 155 mi) south east of Port Blair (10°38′N 94°42′E) by HMS Vigilant and HMS Virago (both United Kingdom).
DC 07 Gretel	Germany	World War II: The patrol ship was sunk by Soviet aircraft at Stolpmünde.
Fuji Maru	Japan	World War II: The auxiliary netlayer was torpedoed and sunk south west of Kagashima, Kyushu (31°09′N 130°31′E) by USS Tirante (United States). 45 Navy passengers were killed.
Leda	Norway	World War II: The passenger ship (2,415 GRT, 1920) was shelled and sunk off the mouth of the Oder by Soviet shore-based artillery. 20 men died. The wreck was raised in December 1948 but declared a total loss and sold in December 1949 for scrapping.
ML 466	United Kingdom	World War II: The Fairmile B motor launch (76/86 t, 1942) was sunk off Walcheren, Netherlands by a mine. 20 crewmen were killed.
Priamus	Germany	World War II: The cargo ship was bombed and sunk off Kristiansand, Norway by Handley Page Halifax aircraft of 502 Squadron, Royal Air Force.
Ranger	Unknown	The tug sank at the entrance to Vizagapatam. She was raised and drydocked on 14 June.
Risui Maru	Japan	World War II: The transport was shelled and sunk in the Andaman Sea east of Khota Andaman, about 135 nautical miles (250 km; 155 mi) south east of Port Blair (10°38′N 94°42′E) by HMS Volage (United Kingdom). 21 crewmen killed.
Shinto Maru No. 2	Japan	World War II: The Shinto Maru No. 2-class auxiliary netlayer (540 GRT 1939) was bombed and damaged at Naha, Okinawa and beached.
Teshio Maru	Japan	World War II: The Yatsushiro Maru-class naval trawler/auxiliary storeship was bombed and sunk in the Andaman Sea east of Khota Andaman, about 135 nautical miles (250 km; 155 mi) south east of Port Blair. (10°35′N 94°45′E) by two Consolidated B-24 Liberator aircraft of the Royal Air Force. The bomb blast brought down one of the Liberators. Eleven crewmen were killed.

== 26 March ==
List of shipwrecks: 26 March 1945
Ship	State	Description
AF 128	Germany	World War II: The MFP-D Type Artilleriefährprahm (168 GRT) was scuttled by her crew in the Neckar near Mannheim, Germany.
Bille	Germany	World War II: The cargo ship was bombed and sunk in the Baltic Sea off Neufahrwasser, Danzig by Soviet Douglas A-20 Havoc aircraft.
CH-63	Japan	World War II: The No.28-class submarine chaser was torpedoed and sunk in the Andaman Sea east of Khota Andaman, about 135 nautical miles south east of Port Blair (10°35′N 94°45′E) by HMS Vigilant (United Kingdom).
HA-69, HA-78 and HA-79	Japan	World War II: The Type C Kō-hyōteki-class midget submarines were scuttled at Talisay, Cebu, Philippines.
HA-209 and HA-210	Japan	The Type D midget submarines went missing off Okinawa.
USS Halligan	United States	World War II: The Fletcher-class destroyer was heavily damaged when she was mined or torpedoed by HA-67 (Japan) in the Pacific Ocean off Okinawa with the loss of 162 of her crew. Survivors were rescued by USS PC-1128 and USS LSM(R)-194 (both United States). The wreck came ashore the next day on Tokashiki.
300 Maru-ni suicide motorboats	Imperial Japanese Army	World War II: Okinawa Campaign: The Maru-Ni suicide boats were destroyed by the United States 77th Infantry Division on Kerama Retto.
Newlands	United Kingdom	World War II: The cargo ship (1,556 GRT, 1921) was sunk in the North Sea (51°28′N 01°25′E) by a Kriegsmarine Seehund midget submarine. Two crew and an armed gunner were killed.
Pacific	Netherlands	World War II: Convoy BTC 108: The coaster (362 GRT) was torpedoed and sunk in the Bay of Falmouth (49°54′N 5°17′W) by U-399 (Kriegsmarine) with the loss of five of her ten crew.
HMS Puffin	United Kingdom	World War II: The Kingfisher-class sloop (510/740 t, 1936) was damaged in the North Sea by a Kriegsmarine Seehund midget submarine. She was taken in to Harwich, Essex but was declared a constructive total loss.
R-145	Germany	World War II: The Type R-130 minesweeper was sunk off Liepāja, Latvia by Soviet Ilyushin Il-2 aircraft.
R-260	Germany	World War II: The Type R-218 minesweeper was sunk off Palanga, Lithuania by Soviet Douglas A-20 Havoc aircraft.
Shinto Maru No. 1	Japan	World War II: The coaster was torpedoed and sunk in the Yellow Sea by USS Balao (United States).
TK-10	Soviet Navy	World War II: The G-5-class motor torpedo boat (17 GRT) was sunk by German aircraft off Palanga, Lithania. Seven crew were killed and another died of wounds.
TK-181 Patriot	Soviet Navy	World War II: The G-5-class motor torpedo boat (17 GRT) was sunk by German aircraft off Palanga, Lithania. Nine crew were killed.
HMAS Terka	Royal Australian Navy	The auxiliary minesweeper (420 GRT, 1925) sank in Madang Harbour New Guinea.
U-399	Germany	World War II: The Type VIIC submarine (1,070 GRT) was depth charged and sunk in the English Channel off Land's End, Cornwall, United Kingdom (49°56′N 5°22′W) by HMS Duckworth (United Kingdom) with the loss of 46 of her 47 crew.
V-310	Germany	World War II: The Vorpostenboot was sunk by Soviet Douglas A-20 Havoc aircraft.
Weser	Germany	World War II: The cargo ship was bombed and sunk in the Baltic Sea by Soviet Douglas A-20 Havoc aircraft.
Zähringen	Germany	World War II: The target ship was scuttled as a block ship in Gotenhafen.

== 27 March ==
List of shipwrecks: 27 March 1945
Ship	State	Description
Gravenstein	Germany	World War II: The cargo ship was scuttled as a blockship at Gotenhafen. Later raised and scrapped.
HA-208	Japan	World War II: The Type D Kō-hyōteki-class midget submarine was bombed and sunk off Okinawa while charging her batteries on the surface.
HMS LCA 1472	United Kingdom	The landing craft assault (8.5/11.5 t, 1944) was lost off Leyte, The Philippines.
Odate	Japan	World War II: The minelayer, originally a Hashima-class cable layer, was strafed in the East China Sea southwest of Kagoshima (30°43′N 127°53′E) by Grumman F6F Hellcat aircraft of the United States Navy and was fatally damaged when her depth charges were detonated, sinking later in the day. Forty-four survivors were rescued later by a passing convoy.
R 145	Germany	World War II: The minesweeper was torpedoed and sunk in the Baltic Sea off Liepāja, Latvia by Soviet aircraft.
R 260	Germany	World War II: The minesweeper was torpedoed and sunk in the Baltic Sea off Liepāja by Soviet Douglas A-20 Havoc aircraft.
Ravenstein	Kriegsmarine	The cargo vessel was scuttled at Gotenhafen as a blockship.
Saßnitz	Germany	World War II: The coastal tanker was torpedoed and sunk in the Baltic Sea off Liepāja by Soviet Douglas A-20 Havoc aircraft.
STS-181	Soviet Navy	World War II: The torpedo boat was shelled and sunk in the Baltic Sea by Kriegsmarine Schnellboote.
TKA-166	Soviet Navy	World War II: The D-3-class motor torpedo boat was shelled and sunk in the Baltic Sea by S-64 (Kriegsmarine).
TKA-196 Mordovskiy Kolkhoznik	Soviet Navy	World War II: The D-3-class motor torpedo boat was damaged, captured, and scuttled in the Baltic Sea by S-81 (Kriegsmarine).
U-722	Germany	World War II: The Type VIIC submarine was depth charged and sunk in the Atlantic Ocean west of Scotland (57°09′N 6°55′W) by HMS Byron, HMS Fitzroy and HMS Redmill (all United Kingdom) with the loss of all 44 crew.
U-905	Germany	World War II: The Type VIIC submarine was depth charged and sunk in The Minch (58°34′N 5°46′W) by HMS Conn (United Kingdom) with the loss of all 45 crew.
UJ 205	Germany	World War II: The submarine chaser, a former Gabbiano-class corvette, was sunk at Venice by American aircraft.
Venus	Germany	World War II: The coaster struck a mine and sank in the Baltic Sea off Cape Arkona, Rügen.
Yusen Maru No. 27 GO	Japan	World War II: Convoy SAYU-02: The auxiliary submarine chaser was lost on this date.

== 28 March ==
List of shipwrecks: 28 March 1945
Ship	State	Description
Antonio	Brazil	The tanker collided with Fort Moose (United Kingdom) off Milford Haven, Pembrokeshire, United Kingdom and was severely damaged. She capsized and sank five nautical miles (9.3 km; 5.8 mi) off St. Ann's Head, Pembrokeshire on 1 March.
Asokawa Maru	Japan	World War II: Convoy HI-88J: The tanker was bombed and sunk in Van Phong Bay (12°31′N 109°22′E) off Nha Trang, French Indochina by Consolidated B-24 Liberator aircraft of the 43rd Bomb Group. A total of 92 passengers, eight gunners and 34 crewmen were killed.
CD-33	Japan	World War II: The Type C escort ship was sunk in the Pacific Ocean south west of Shikoku (31°45′N 131°50′E) by United States Navy aircraft from Task Force 58. All 170 crewmen were lost.
Honan Maru	Japan	World War II: Convoy HI-88J: The Imperial Japanese Army-chartered British WWI Standard Tanker (a.k.a. Konan Maru) was torpedoed and damaged in the South China Sea off Nha Trang, French Indochina, near Hon Doi Islet (12°40′N 109°30′E) by USS Bluegill (United States). Five gunners and 44 crewmen were killed. Mikura (Japan) rescued six crewmen and CD-84 (Japan) rescued fifteen crewmen. The abandoned vessel drifted ashore on Hon Doi Islet (12°40′N 109°27′E). The next day Bluegill torpedoed the ship again starting an inferno that burned out the ship.
KT-222	Soviet Navy	World War II: The K-18-class river minesweeping launch was sunk in error by Soviet artillery on the Danube near Sutto, Hungary.
KT-729	Soviet Navy	World War II: The K-18-class river minesweeping launch was sunk in error by Soviet artillery on the Danube near Sutto, Hungary.
Kaio Maru	Japan	The auxiliary patrol ship was lost on this date.
HMS LCP(R)-840	United Kingdom	World War II: The landing craft personnel (5.9/8.2 t, 1943) struck a mine and sank in the North Sea.
Meiho Maru	Japan	World War II: The cargo ship was sunk by United States Army Air Forces Consolidated B-24 Liberator aircraft of the United States Fifth Air Force off the north coast of Formosa (25°00′N 121°00′E). Three crew died.
Mikura	Japan	World War II: The Mikura-class escort ship was sunk in the Pacific Ocean south west of Shikoku (31°45′N 131°50′E) by USS Threadfin (United States). All 216 crewmen were killed.
Nase Maru	Japan	World War II: The fishing ship was torpedoed and sunk in the Pacific Ocean south of Kyushu by USS Tirante (United States). 19 crew and 2 gunners died.
Oklahoma	United States	World War II: The tanker was torpedoed and sunk in the Atlantic Ocean (13°37′N 41°43′W) by U-532 (Kriegsmarine) with the loss of fourteen gunners and 36 crewmen. Twelve gunners and ten crewmen were rescued on 14 April by Delaware (United States).
Ōyodo	Japan	World War II: The Ōyodo-class cruiser was bombed, capsized and sunk in shallow water by carrier aircraft from Task Force 58 at Etajima. After capsizing her bottom was hit by 5-inch (130 mm) rockets. Between this attack and a previous attack on 24 March, 223 crew were killed and 180 wounded.
PB-108	Japan	World War II: The patrol boat was sunk in the Gulf of Boni off Maniang Island, Celebes (04°14′S 121°28′E) by Consolidated B-24 Liberator aircraft of the United States Thirteenth Air Force. Sixty-nine crewmen were killed, nine were wounded.
USS Skylark	United States	World War II: The Auk-class minesweeper struck a mine and sank in the Pacific Ocean off Hagushi Bay, Okinawa (26°20′N 127°40′E), with the loss of five of her 105 crewmen. Survivors were rescued by the high-speed minesweeper USS Tolman (United States).
St. Jan	Belgium	World War II: The fishing boat struck a mine laid by German S-Boote and sank in the North Sea (51°30′N 3°0′E), with the loss all five crew.
USS Trigger	United States	World War II: The Gato-class submarine was depth charged and sunk in the Pacific Ocean off the Ryukyu Islands (32°16′N 123°05′E) by Mikura, CD-33 and CD-59 (all Japan). She was lost with all 89 crew.
W-11	Japan	World War II: The No.7-class minesweeper was sunk in Makassar Bay (05°06′S 119°14′E) by Consolidated B-24 Liberator aircraft of the United States Thirteenth Air Force.
USS YR-43	United States Navy	While under tow in the Gulf of Alaska by the tug LT-373 ( United States Army), the diesel auxiliary floating workshop broke loose, drifted ashore, and was wrecked 2.5 nautical miles (4.6 km; 2.9 mi) south of Zaikof Point on Montague Island, Territory of Alaska, at the entrance to Prince William Sound. Her entire crew survived, and was rescued by the rescue tug USS ATR-68 (United States Navy), the lighthouse tender USCGC Cedar and the buoy tender USCGC Bramble (both United States Coast Guard).

== 29 March ==
List of shipwrecks: 29 March 1945
Ship	State	Description
CD-18	Japan	World War II: Convoy HI-88J: The Type D escort ship was strafed, bombed and sunk in the South China Sea 35 miles (56 km) off Cap Batangan, French Indochina (14°44′N 109°16′E) by North American B-25 Mitchell aircraft of the 498th and 501st Bomb Squadrons, United States Fifth Air Force. One hundred and eighty four crewmen including her commanding officer were killed.
CD-84	Japan	World War II: Convoy HI-88J: The Type D escort ship was torpedoed and sunk in the South China Sea 20 miles (32 km) north north east of point An Yo (14°40′N 109°16′E) by USS Hammerhead (United States Navy). Six Honan Maru survivors and all of her 191 crewmen were killed. Some survivors were rescued by Manju (Japan).
CD-130	Japan	World War II: Convoy HI-88J: The Type D escort ship was strafed, bombed and sunk in the South China Sea off Nha Trang, French Indochina (14°39′N 109°16′E) by North American B-25 Mitchell aircraft of the 498th and 501st Bomb Squadrons, United States Fifth Air Force. All 178 crewmen were killed.
Flint	United States	The 366-foot (112 m) Design B7-D1 concrete-hulled barge dragged anchor and stranded on the beach at Iwo Jima, partially holed. She was scuttled at Position Able North (24°00′N 141°29′E) on 1 April as part of an artificial harbor project.
KT-125	Soviet Navy	The K-15/M-17-class river minesweeping launch was sunk on this date.
Kaiko Maru	Japan	World War II: Convoy HI-88J: The tanker was strafed, bombed and sunk in the South China Sea off Nha Trang, French Indochina (15°14′N 109°26′E) by North American B-25 Mitchell aircraft of the 500th bomb Squadron, United States Fifth Air Force. Twelve passengers, four gunners and nineteen crewmen were killed.
Kommandøren	Norway	World War II: The cargo ship (543 GRT, 1891) was torpedoed and sunk at Bergen, Norway, by S 13 (Kriegsmarine) with the loss of a crew member.
Pa-173	Japan	World War II: The Pa-1-class patrol boat was sunk by a mine in Wakamatsu Harbour. Later raised but not repaired.
15 Shin'yō suicide motorboats	Japan	World War II: Okinawa Campaign: The Shin'yō-class suicide motorboats were sunk/destroyed by US Navy aircraft off Okinawa.
Showa Maru No. 2 GO	Japan	World War II: Convoy SAYU-02: The auxiliary submarine chaser was lost on this date.
HMCS Teme	Royal Canadian Navy	World War II: Convoy BTC 111: The River-class frigate (1,370/1,920 t, 1944) was torpedoed and damaged in the Atlantic Ocean off Land's End, Cornwall, United Kingdom (50°07′N 5°45′W) by U-315 (Kriegsmarine). She was consequently declared a total loss and sold for scrap in December 1945.
U-1106	Germany	World War II: The Type VIIC/41 submarine was depth charged and sunk in the Atlantic Ocean north east of the Faroe Islands (61°46′N 2°16′W) by a Consolidated B-24 Liberator aircraft of 224 Squadron, Royal Air Force with the loss of all 46 crew.
U-1169	Germany	World War II: The Type VIIC/41 submarine was depth charged and sunk in the English Channel south of Lizard Point, Cornwall, United Kingdom by HMS Duckworth (Royal Navy) with the loss of all 49 crew.
UJ 308	Germany	The KSK-2-class naval drifter/submarine chaser was lost in a collision on this date, raised post war, repaired and put in Soviet service.
V-5532	Germany	World War II: The KSK-2-class naval drifter/Vorpostenboot was shelled and set alight by HNoMS MTB 716 and HNoMS MTB 717 (both Royal Norwegian Navy) in Stokksundet, Norway, and beached. The ship was then destroyed by the fire. Of the 17-man crew, eight were killed and nine were wounded.

== 30 March ==
List of shipwrecks: 30 March 1945
Ship	State	Description
Eider	Germany	World War II: The coaster was sunk in an American air raid on Wilhelmshaven, Lower Saxony.
Eikichi Maru	Japan	World War II: The auxiliary gunboat was torpedoed and sunk in the Pacific Ocean south of Kyushu by USS Tirante (United States).
F 6 Königin Luise	Germany	World War II: The command ship, a former F-class escort ship, was bombed and sunk by American Consolidated B-24 Liberator aircraft at Wilhelmshaven.
Gijon	Germany	World War II: The cargo ship was sunk in an American air raid on Bremen.
Gudrid	Norway	World War II: The cargo ship (1,305 GRT, 1922) was bombed and sunk at Menstad, Norway by de Havilland Mosquito aircraft of 143, 235, 248 and 333 Squadrons, Royal Air Force. Raised post-war, repaired and returned to service in 1948.
Hamburg	Germany	World War II: The coaster was sunk in an American air raid on Wilhelmshaven.
Hansburg	Germany	World War II: The cargo ship was sunk in an American air raid on Wilhelmshaven.
HMS High Tide	United Kingdom	The examination vessel, an Admiralty type drifter (106 GRT, 1919), foundered off northern Wales.
Jim	United Kingdom	World War II: The coaster (833 GRT, 1908) was either torpedoed and sunk in the North Sea by a Kriegsmarine Seehund midget submarine, or foundered in a storm.
Kiri Maru No. 5 Go	Japan	The auxiliary minesweeper was lost on this date.
Köln	Germany	World War II: The Königsberg-class cruiser was bombed and sunk at Wilhelmshaven by Consolidated B-24 Liberator aircraft of the United States Army Air Force. The wreck was broken up in 1946.
HMS LCA 1433	United Kingdom	The landing craft assault was smashed by waves during a storm in the Admiralty Islands.
M-329	Germany	World War II: The minesweeper was bombed and sunk by American aircraft at Wilhelmshaven.
M 3430 Mardyck	Germany	World War II: The auxiliary minesweeper was bombed and sunk by American aircraft at Wilhelmshaven.
M 3138	Germany	World War II: The minesweeper struck a mine and sank in the Baltic Sea off Kolberg, Pomerania.
Njassa	Germany	World War II: The accommodation ship was sunk in an American air raid on Wilhelmshaven. She was refloated in 1946 and scrapped.
Quirid Borgstad	Norway	World War II: The coaster (1,664 GRT) was sunk at Porsgrunn, Norway by de Havilland Mosquito aircraft of 143, 235, 248 and 33 Squadrons, Royal Air Force.
RA 256	Germany	The minesweeper, a former VAS 301-class submarine chaser, was lost on this date.
S 186	Germany	World War II: The torpedo boat was sunk in an American air raid on Wilhelmshaven, Germany.
S 194	Germany	World War II: The torpedo boat was sunk in an American air raid on Wilhelmshaven, Germany.
S 224	Germany	World War II: The torpedo boat was sunk in an American air raid on Wilhelmshaven, Germany.
Scharnhörn	Germany	World War II: The cargo ship was bombed and sunk at Menstad by de Havilland Mosquito aircraft of 143, 235, 248 and 333 Squadrons, RAF.
Shinan Maru	Japan	World War II: Convoy HI-88J: The auxiliary submarine chaser was sunk in the South China Sea off Yulin, Hainan, China (18°09′N 109°42′E) by North American B-25 Mitchell aircraft of the United States Army Air Force.
Specht	Germany	World War II: The coaster was sunk in an American air raid on Wilhelmshaven.
Stella	Germany	World War II: The cargo ship was bombed and sunk in an American air raid on Bremen, Germany.
Svanefjell	Norway	World War II: The cargo ship (1,371 GRT, 1936) was bombed and sunk at Menstad, Norway by de Havilland Mosquito aircraft of 143, 235, 248 and 333 Squadrons, Royal Air Force. Raised post-war, repaired and returned to service.
Torafire	Norway	World War II: The cargo ship (823 GRT, 1920) was bombed and sunk at Menstad, Norway by de Havilland Mosquito aircraft of 143, 235, 248 and 333 Squadrons, Royal Air Force. Raised in August 1945, repaired and returned to service in February 1948.
U-96	Germany	World War II: The Type VIIC submarine was bombed and sunk at Wilhelmshaven by United States Army Air Force aircraft.
U-348	Germany	World War II: The Type VIIC submarine was bombed and sunk at Hamburg (53°33′N 9°57′E) by United States Army Air Force aircraft with the loss of two crew.
U-350	Germany	World War II: The Type VIIC submarine was bombed and sunk at Finkenwerder, Hamburg (53°33′N 9°57′E) by United States Army Air Force aircraft.
U-429	Germany	World War II: The Type VIIC submarine was bombed and sunk at Wilhelmshaven (53°31′N 8°10′E) by United States Army Air Force aircraft.
U-430	Germany	World War II: The Type VIIC submarine was bombed and sunk at Bremen (53°08′N 8°46′E) by United States Army Air Force aircraft.
U-870	Germany	World War II: The Type IXC/40 submarine was bombed and sunk at Bremen by United States Army Air Force aircraft.
U-882	Germany	World War II: The Type IXC/40 submarine was sunk in an American air raid on Bremen.
U-884	Germany	World War II: The Type IXD/42 submarine was sunk in an American air raid on Bremen.
U-965	Germany	World War II: The Type VIIC submarine was depth charged and sunk in the Atlantic Ocean north of Scotland (58°19′N 5°31′W) by HMS Conn and HMS Rupert (both United Kingdom).
U-1131	Germany	World War II: The Type VIIc submarine was bombed and sunk at Hamburg in an American air raid. She was later scrapped.
U-1167	Germany	World War II: The Type VIIC/41 submarine was bombed and sunk at Hamburg in a British air raid with the loss of one crew member.
U-1197	Germany	World War II: The Type VIIC submarine was damaged in an American air raid on Bremen. She was consequently decommissioned.
U-2340	Germany	World War II: The Type XXIII submarine was bombed and sunk at Hamburg in a British air raid. The wreck was scrapped post-war.
U-3036	Germany	World War II: The Type XXI submarine was sunk in an American air raid on Bremen.
U-3042	Germany	World War II: The Type XXI submarine was destroyed on the slips in an American air raid on Bremen.
U-3043	Germany	World War II: The Type XXI submarine was destroyed on the slips in an American air raid on Bremen.
U-3046	Germany	World War II: The Type XXI submarine was sunk in an American air raid on Bremen.
U-3045	Germany	World War II: The Type XXI submarine was sunk in an American air raid on Bremen.
U-3508	Germany	World War II: The Type XXI submarine was sunk in an American air raid on Wilhelmshaven.
Vistula	Germany	World War II: The submarine tender was sunk in an American air raid on Wilhelmshaven.
Vs 343	Germany	World War II: The patrol boat struck a mine and sank in the Baltic Sea off Kolberg.

== 31 March ==
List of shipwrecks: 31 March 1945
Ship	State	Description
Ammon	Germany	World War II: The cargo ship was sunk in an Allied air raid on Hamburg. She was refloated in 1948 and scrapped.
HA-60	Japan	World War II: The Type C-class midget submarine was bombed and damaged off Unten, Okinawa. She runs aground while trying to evade the attack and is abandoned.
I-8	Japan	World War II: The Type J3 submarine was depth charged, shelled and sunk in the Pacific Ocean off Okinawa by USS Morrison and USS Stockton (both United States) with the loss of 99 of her 100 crew. The survivor was rescued by USS Morrison.
John C. Fremont	United States	World War II: The Liberty ship was damaged by a mine in Subic Bay, Philippines and was declared a constructive total loss. There were no casualties.
Martha Russ I	Germany	World War II: The cargo ship was sunk in a British and Canadian air raid on Hamburg. She was raised in 1948, repaired the next year and sailed until 1962.
Nanho Maru	Japan	World War II: The auxiliary submarine chaser was sunk by Consolidated B-24 Liberator aircraft off Makassar.
Stormarn	Germany	World War II: The cargo ship was sunk in a British and Canadian air raid on Hamburg.

== Unknown date ==
List of shipwrecks: Unknown date 1945
Ship	State	Description
Celebes	Germany	World War II: The transport ship was bombed and severely damaged at Hamburg. She was repaired 1945–46 and entered Dutch service in November 1946.
Frigga	Germany	World War II: The cargo ship was bombed and sunk by Allied aircraft at Schulau. She was refloated later that year, repaired and returned to service.
Hans Rolshoven	Germany	World War II: The salvaged, but unrepaired, Hans Rolshoven-class seaplane tender was bombed and sunk by British bombers at Sassnitz.
Jersbek	Germany	World War II: The cargo ship was bombed and sunk by Soviet aircraft on 9 March, or bombed and sunk by Soviet Douglas A-20 Havoc and Ilyushin Il-4 aircraft on 28 March, or struck a mine and sank in the Baltic Sea off Pillau (54°40′48″N 19°53′00″E) on 30 March.
USS Kete	United States	World War II: The Balao-class submarine was lost in the Pacific Ocean on or after 20 March. She may have been torpedoed and sunk on 20 March by Ro-41 (Japan).
HMS LCA 1112	United Kingdom	The landing craft assault was lost sometime in March.
HMS LCA 1153	United Kingdom	The landing craft assault was lost sometime in March.
HMS LCM 1011	United Kingdom	The landing craft mechanized was lost in the Mediterranean Sea.
T40, T41 and T42	Germany	World War II: The incomplete Type 1941 torpedo boats were scuttled by their builder to prevent capture by the Red Army at the Schichau Yard, Elbing.
T43, T44, T45, T46, T47, T48, T49, and T50	Germany	World War II:The incomplete Type 1941 torpedo boats were destroyed by their builder to prevent capture by the Red Army at the Schichau Yard, Elbing.
TS 15	Germany	The incomplete torpedo training ship, originally designed to be an M 1940-class minesweeper, was destroyed on the stocks at Memel sometime in March (probably on 23 March).
Two unknown submarines	Japan	World War II: The midget submarines were scuttled at Davao, Philippines late in the month.
U-296	Germany	World War II: The Type VIIC submarine was lost on or about 12 March on patrol in the Atlantic Ocean (approximately 55°30′N 7°00′W) possibly due to striking a mine. All 42 crew were killed.
U-758	Germany	World War II: The Type VIIC submarine was severely damaged in a British air raid on Kiel, Schleswig-Holstein. She was struck from the navy list on 16 March. Scrapped in 1946.
Winrich von Kniprode	Germany	World War II: The troopship was bombed and damaged at Pillau in an Allied air raid. Subsequently repaired and returned to service
USS YCF-23, USS YCF-29, USS YCF-36 and USS YCF-37	United States	The non-self-propelled car floats were lost en route to Eniwetok sometime in March.
