= German submarine U-1195 =

German World War II submarine

History

Nazi Germany
- Name: U-1195
- Ordered: 25 August 1941
- Builder: F Schichau GmbH, Danzig
- Yard number: 1565
- Laid down: 6 February 1943
- Launched: 2 September 1943
- Commissioned: 4 November 1943
- Fate: Sunk on 7 April 1945

General characteristics
- Class & type: Type VIIC submarine
- Displacement: 769 tonnes (757 long tons) surfaced; 871 t (857 long tons) submerged
- Length: 67.10 m (220 ft 2 in) o/a; 50.50 m (165 ft 8 in) pressure hull
- Beam: 6.20 m (20 ft 4 in) o/a; 4.70 m (15 ft 5 in) pressure hull
- Height: 9.60 m (31 ft 6 in)
- Draught: 4.74 m (15 ft 7 in)
- Installed power: 2,800–3,200 PS (2,100–2,400 kW; 2,800–3,200 bhp) (diesels); 750 PS (550 kW; 740 shp) (electric)
- Propulsion: 2 shafts; 2 × diesel engines; 2 × electric motors
- Speed: 17.7 knots (32.8 km/h; 20.4 mph) surfaced; 7.6 knots (14.1 km/h; 8.7 mph) submerged
- Range: 8,500 nmi (15,700 km; 9,800 mi) at 10 knots (19 km/h; 12 mph) surfaced; 80 nmi (150 km; 92 mi) at 4 knots (7.4 km/h; 4.6 mph) submerged
- Test depth: 230 m (750 ft); Crush depth: 250–295 m (820–968 ft)
- Complement: 4 officers, 40–56 enlisted
- Armament: 5 × 53.3 cm (21 in) torpedo tubes (4 bow, 1 stern); 14 × torpedoes or 26 TMA mines; 1 × 8.8 cm (3.46 in) deck gun (220 rounds); 1 × 3.7 cm (1.5 in) Flak M42 AA gun; 2 × twin 2 cm (0.79 in) C/30 anti-aircraft guns

Service record
- Part of: 21st U-boat Flotilla; 4 November – 31 December 1943; 24th U-boat Flotilla; 1 January – 31 October 1944; 5th U-boat Flotilla; 1 November – 31 December 1944; 11th U-boat Flotilla; 1 January – 7 April 1945
- Identification codes: M 54 254
- Commanders: Oblt.z.S. Karl-Heinz Schröter; 4 November 1943 – 31 October 1944; Kptlt. Ernst Cordes; 1 November 1944 – 7 April 1945
- Operations: 1 patrol: 25 February – 7 April 1945
- Victories: 2 merchant ships sunk (18,614 GRT)

German submarine U-1195 was a Type VIIC U-boat of Nazi Germany's Kriegsmarine.

Her keel was laid down 6 February 1943, by F. Schichau, of Danzig. She was commissioned 4 November 1943.

== Design ==
German Type VIIC submarines were preceded by the shorter Type VIIB submarines. U-1195 had a displacement of 769 tonnes (757 long tons) when at the surface and 871 tonnes (857 long tons) while submerged. She had a total length of 67.10 m (220 ft 2 in), a pressure hull length of 50.50 m (165 ft 8 in), a beam of 6.20 m (20 ft 4 in), a height of 9.60 m (31 ft 6 in), and a draught of 4.74 m (15 ft 7 in). The submarine was powered by two Germaniawerft F46 four-stroke, six-cylinder supercharged diesel engines producing a total of 2,800 to 3,200 metric horsepower (2,060 to 2,350 kW; 2,760 to 3,160 shp) for use while surfaced, two AEG GU 460/8–27 double-acting electric motors producing a total of 750 metric horsepower (550 kW; 740 shp) for use while submerged. She had two shafts and two 1.23 m (4 ft) propellers. The boat was capable of operating at depths of up to 230 metres (750 ft).

The submarine had a maximum surface speed of 17.7 knots (32.8 km/h; 20.4 mph) and a maximum submerged speed of 7.6 knots (14.1 km/h; 8.7 mph). When submerged, the boat could operate for 80 nautical miles (150 km; 92 mi) at 4 knots (7.4 km/h; 4.6 mph); when surfaced, she could travel 8,500 nautical miles (15,700 km; 9,800 mi) at 10 knots (19 km/h; 12 mph). U-1195 was fitted with five 53.3 cm (21 in) torpedo tubes (four fitted at the bow and one at the stern), fourteen torpedoes, one 8.8 cm (3.46 in) SK C/35 naval gun, (220 rounds), one 3.7 cm (1.5 in) Flak M42 and two twin 2 cm (0.79 in) C/30 anti-aircraft guns. The boat had a complement of between forty-four and sixty.

== Service history ==
Under the command of Ernst Cordes, she sank the Liberty Ship John R. Park. on 21 March 1945. Another account suggests the ship sunk was the James Eagan Layne though this sinking is usually credited to U-399.

U-1195 attacked Convoy VWP 16 in the English Channel, sinking the troop transport Cuba on 6 April 1945. She was sunk by one of the convoy's escorts, the Royal Navy destroyer HMS Watchman, using a Hedgehog antisubmarine mortar on 7 April 1945 to the southeast of the Isle of Wight at 50°33′22.26″N 0°56′17.81″W (WGS84) in 30 metres (98 feet) of water. Fifty crew members were alive when she sank; however, only 14 survived. Kemp reports the crew had to make a risky underwater escape from the wrecked vessel.

== Summary of raiding history ==
Date	Ship Name	Nationality	Tonnage (GRT)	Fate
21 March 1945	John R. Park	United States	7,194	Sunk
6 April 1945	Cuba	United Kingdom	11,420	Sunk

== Bibliography ==
- Busch, Rainer; Röll, Hans-Joachim (1999). German U-boat commanders of World War II : a biographical dictionary. Translated by Brooks, Geoffrey. London, Annapolis, Md: Greenhill Books, Naval Institute Press. ISBN 1-55750-186-6.
- Busch, Rainer; Röll, Hans-Joachim (1999). Deutsche U-Boot-Verluste von September 1939 bis Mai 1945 [German U-boat losses from September 1939 to May 1945]. Der U-Boot-Krieg (in German). Vol. IV. Hamburg, Berlin, Bonn: Mittler. ISBN 3-8132-0514-2.
- Gröner, Erich; Jung, Dieter; Maass, Martin (1991). German Warships 1815–1945, U-boats and Mine Warfare Vessels. Vol. 2. Translated by Thomas, Keith; Magowan, Rachel. London: Conway Maritime Press. ISBN 0-85177-593-4.
- Kemp, Paul (1997). U-Boats Destroyed, German submarine losses in the World Wars. Arms and Armour. ISBN 1-85409-515-3.
