= German submarine U-315 =

German World War II submarine

History

Nazi Germany
- Name: U-315
- Ordered: 25 August 1941
- Builder: Flender Werke, Lübeck
- Yard number: 315
- Laid down: 7 July 1942
- Launched: 29 May 1943
- Commissioned: 10 July 1943
- Fate: Surrendered in Norway on 9 May 1945, broken up in March 1947

General characteristics
- Class & type: Type VIIC submarine
- Displacement: 769 tonnes (757 long tons) surfaced; 871 t (857 long tons) submerged
- Length: 67.10 m (220 ft 2 in) o/a; 50.50 m (165 ft 8 in) pressure hull
- Beam: 6.20 m (20 ft 4 in) o/a; 4.70 m (15 ft 5 in) pressure hull
- Height: 9.60 m (31 ft 6 in)
- Draught: 4.74 m (15 ft 7 in)
- Installed power: 2,800–3,200 PS (2,100–2,400 kW; 2,800–3,200 bhp) (diesels); 750 PS (550 kW; 740 shp) (electric)
- Propulsion: 2 shafts; 2 × diesel engines; 2 × electric motors.
- Speed: 17.7 knots (32.8 km/h; 20.4 mph) surfaced; 7.6 knots (14.1 km/h; 8.7 mph) submerged
- Range: 8,500 nmi (15,700 km; 9,800 mi) at 10 knots (19 km/h; 12 mph) surfaced; 80 nmi (150 km; 92 mi) at 4 knots (7.4 km/h; 4.6 mph) submerged
- Test depth: 230 m (750 ft); Crush depth: 250–295 m (820–968 ft)
- Complement: 4 officers, 40–56 enlisted
- Armament: 5 × 53.3 cm (21 in) torpedo tubes (four bow, one stern); 14 × torpedoes or 26 TMA mines; 1 × 8.8 cm (3.46 in) deck gun (220 rounds); 2 × twin 2 cm (0.79 in) C/30 anti-aircraft guns

Service record
- Part of: 8th U-boat Flotilla; 10 July 1943 – 28 February 1944; 11th U-boat Flotilla; 1 March – 14 September 1944; 13th U-boat Flotilla; 15 September 1944 – 8 May 1945
- Identification codes: M 53 225
- Commanders: Oblt.z.S. Herbert Zoller; 10 July 1943 – 9 May 1945
- Operations: 11 patrols: 1st patrol: 21 February – 9 March 1944; 2nd patrol: 23 March – 10 April 1944; 3rd patrol: a. 19 April – 14 May 1944; b. 25 – 26 May 1944; 4th patrol: 30 May – 10 July 1944; 5th patrol: 28 August – 4 September 1944; 6th patrol: 8 – 26 September 1944; 7th patrol: 29 September – 3 October 1944; 8th patrol: a. 12 October – 10 November 1944; b. 19 – 21 November 1944; 9th patrol: a. 21 November – 6 December 1944; b. 9 – 12 December 1944; 10th patrol: 25 December 1944 – 6 January 1945; 11th patrol: 15 February – 24 April 1945
- Victories: 1 merchant ship sunk (6,996 GRT); 1 warship total loss (1,370 tons)

German submarine U-315 was a Type VIIC U-boat of Nazi Germany's Kriegsmarine during World War II. The submarine was laid down on 7 July 1942 at the Flender Werke yard at Lübeck as yard number 315, launched on 29 May 1943 and commissioned on 10 July under the command of Oberleutnant zur See Herbert Zoller.

During her career, the U-boat sailed on 11 combat patrols, sinking one ship and causing another to be declared a total loss, before she surrendered on 9 May 1945.

She was a member of thirteen wolfpacks.

== Design ==
German Type VIIC submarines were preceded by the shorter Type VIIB submarines. U-315 had a displacement of 769 tonnes (757 long tons) when at the surface and 871 tonnes (857 long tons) while submerged. She had a total length of 67.10 m (220 ft 2 in), a pressure hull length of 50.50 m (165 ft 8 in), a beam of 6.20 m (20 ft 4 in), a height of 9.60 m (31 ft 6 in), and a draught of 4.74 m (15 ft 7 in). The submarine was powered by two Germaniawerft F46 four-stroke, six-cylinder supercharged diesel engines producing a total of 2,800 to 3,200 metric horsepower (2,060 to 2,350 kW; 2,760 to 3,160 shp) for use while surfaced, two Garbe, Lahmeyer & Co. RP 137/c double-acting electric motors producing a total of 750 metric horsepower (550 kW; 740 shp) for use while submerged. She had two shafts and two 1.23 m (4 ft) propellers. The boat was capable of operating at depths of up to 230 metres (750 ft).

The submarine had a maximum surface speed of 17.7 knots (32.8 km/h; 20.4 mph) and a maximum submerged speed of 7.6 knots (14.1 km/h; 8.7 mph). When submerged, the boat could operate for 80 nautical miles (150 km; 92 mi) at 4 knots (7.4 km/h; 4.6 mph); when surfaced, she could travel 8,500 nautical miles (15,700 km; 9,800 mi) at 10 knots (19 km/h; 12 mph). U-315 was fitted with five 53.3 cm (21 in) torpedo tubes (four fitted at the bow and one at the stern), fourteen torpedoes, one 8.8 cm (3.46 in) SK C/35 naval gun, 220 rounds, and two twin 2 cm (0.79 in) C/30 anti-aircraft guns. The boat had a complement of between forty-four and sixty.

== Service history ==
The boat's service life began with training with the 8th U-boat Flotilla from 10 July 1943. She was then transferred to the 11th flotilla for operations on 1 March 1944. She was reassigned to the 13th flotilla on 15 September 1944.

The boat made the short journey from Kiel in Germany to Bergen in Norway, in February 1944.

=== First patrol ===
The submarine's first patrol began with her departure from Bergen on 21 February 1944. After covering the Norwegian and Barents seas, she docked at Narvik on 9 March.

=== Second to sixth patrols ===
A similar pattern now became apparent, except her sixth sortie took the U-boat to the entrance to Murmansk in the Soviet Union.

=== Seventh, eighth and ninth patrols ===
U-315's seventh foray was, at five days, her shortest; starting in Bogenbucht (west of Narvik), on 29 September 1944 and finishing in Hammerfest on 3 October.

Her eighth patrol was fairly routine, after which she moved from Kilbotn to Skjomenfjord in November 1944.

The boat's ninth patrol was much the same as her eighth, passing north of Bear Island between 29 and 30 November 1944.

=== Tenth patrol ===
Patrol number 10 took the submarine to the gap between the Faroe and Shetland Islands.

=== Eleventh patrol ===
What turned out to be U-315's last patrol was her longest (69 days) and most successful. On 22 March 1945, she sank the Empire Kingsley northwest of Lands End. In the same area, she torpedoed HMCS Teme on 29 March. The Canadian frigate lost 60 ft (18 m) of her stern and although she did not sink, was declared a total loss.

=== Fate ===
The boat surrendered in Trondheim at war's end. There, she was broken up in March 1947.

== Summary of raiding history ==
Date	Ship Name	Nationality	Tonnage (Note: Merchant ship tonnages are in gross register tons. Military vessels are listed by tons displacement.)	Fate
22 March 1945	Empire Kingsley	United Kingdom	6,996	Sunk
29 March 1945	HMCS Teme	Royal Canadian Navy	1,370	Total loss

== Bibliography ==
- Busch, Rainer; Röll, Hans-Joachim (1999). German U-boat commanders of World War II : a biographical dictionary. Translated by Brooks, Geoffrey. London, Annapolis, Md: Greenhill Books, Naval Institute Press. ISBN 1-55750-186-6.
- Busch, Rainer; Röll, Hans-Joachim (1999). Der U-Boot-Krieg, 1939-1945: Deutsche U-Boot-Verluste von September 1939 bis Mai 1945 [German U-boat losses from September 1939 to May 1945] (in German). Vol. IV. Hamburg, Berlin, Bonn: Mittler. ISBN 3-8132-0514-2.
- Gröner, Erich; Jung, Dieter; Maass, Martin (1991). U-boats and Mine Warfare Vessels. German Warships 1815–1945. Vol. 2. Translated by Thomas, Keith; Magowan, Rachel. London: Conway Maritime Press. ISBN 0-85177-593-4.
