= SS Rjev =

History
- Name: Hendrik Fisser VII (1944-45); Empire Gallic (1945-46); Rjev or Rzhev (1946-70)
- Owner: Fisser & Van Doornum (1944-45); Ministry of War Transport (1945-46); Soviet Government (1946-70)
- Operator: Fisser & Van Doornum (1944-45); Ellerman's Wilson Lines Ltd (1945-46); Murmansk Shipping Company (1946-70)
- Port of registry: (Nazi Germany) Emden, Germany (1944-45); London, United Kingdom (1945-46); Murmansk, Soviet Union (1946-70)
- Builder: T U K Smit / Deutsche Werft
- Yard number: 796
- Launched: July 1944
- Completed: November 1944
- Out of service: 1970
- Identification: United Kingdom Official Number 180616 (1945-46); Code Letters GLLS (1945-46); IMO number: 5297335 ( –1970)
- Fate: Scrapped

General characteristics
- Class & type: Hansa A type Cargo ship
- Tonnage: 1,944 GRT, 985 NRT, 3,120 DWT
- Length: 85.19 m (279 ft 6 in)
- Beam: 13.49 m (44 ft 3 in)
- Depth: 4.78 m (15 ft 8 in)
- Installed power: Compound steam engine, 1,200IHP
- Propulsion: Single screw propeller
- Speed: 10.5 knots (19.4 km/h)

Rjev or Rzhev (Russian: Ржев) was a Hansa A Type cargo ship which was built as Hendrik Visser VII in 1944 by T U K Smit, Kinderdijk, Netherlands and completed by Deutsche Werft, Hamburg, Germany for Fisser & Van Doornum, Emden, Germany. She was seized as a prize of war in 1945, passing to the Ministry of War Transport and renamed Empire Gallic. She was allocated to the Soviet Union in 1946 and renamed Rjev. She served until 1970 when she was scrapped.

== Description ==
The ship was 85.19 m (279 ft 6 in) long, with a beam of 13.49 m (44 ft 3 in). She had a depth of 4.78 m (15 ft 8 in). She was assessed as 1,925 GRT, 985 NRT, 3,120 DWT.

The ship was propelled by a compound steam engine, which had two cylinders of 42 cm (16 9/16 inches) and two cylinders of 90 cm (35 7/16 inches) diameter by 90 cm (35 7/16 inches) stroke. The engine was built by Rheinmetall-Borsig AG, Tegel, Germany. Rated at 1,200IHP, it drove a single screw propeller and could propel the ship at 10.5 knots (19.4 km/h).

== History ==
Hendrik Fisser VII was a Hansa A Type cargo ship built in 1944 as yard number 796 by T U K Smit, Kinderdijk, Netherlands for Fisser & Van Doornum, Emden, Germany. She was launched in July 1944 and completed by Deutsche Werft, Hamburg Germany in November. Her port of registry was Emden. Hendrik Fisser VII participated in the evacuation of East Prussia, carrying troops of the 21st Infantry Division from Hela to Kiel. On 12 March 1945, she collided with the vorpostenboot V 315 Bris off Rixhöft. The vorpostenboot sank.

In May 1945, Hendrik Fisser VII was seized as a prize of war at Kiel. She was passed to the Ministry of War Transport. She was renamed Empire Gallic. The Code Letters GLLS and United Kingdom Official Number 180615 were allocated. Her port of registry was London and she was operated under the management of the Ellerman's Wilson Lines Ltd, Hull.

In 1946, Empire Gallic was allocated to the Soviet Union and was renamed Rjev (sometimes spelled Rzhev). She was operated under the management of the Murmansk Shipping Company. Her port of registry was Murmansk. With their introduction in the 1960s, Rjev was allocated the IMO Number 5297335. She served until 1970, arriving at Hamburg on 13 July for scrapping by Eisen & Metall.
