= German submarine U-399 =

German World War II submarine

History

Nazi Germany
- Name: U-399
- Ordered: 25 August 1941
- Builder: Howaldtswerke, Kiel
- Yard number: 31
- Laid down: 12 November 1942
- Launched: 4 December 1943
- Commissioned: 22 January 1944
- Fate: Sunk in the English Channel on 26 March 1945

General characteristics
- Class & type: Type VIIC submarine
- Displacement: 769 tonnes (757 long tons) surfaced; 871 t (857 long tons) submerged
- Length: 67.10 m (220 ft 2 in) o/a; 50.50 m (165 ft 8 in) pressure hull
- Beam: 6.20 m (20 ft 4 in) o/a; 4.70 m (15 ft 5 in) pressure hull
- Height: 9.60 m (31 ft 6 in)
- Draught: 4.74 m (15 ft 7 in)
- Installed power: 2,800–3,200 PS (2,100–2,400 kW; 2,800–3,200 bhp) (diesels); 750 PS (550 kW; 740 shp) (electric)
- Propulsion: 2 shafts; 2 × diesel engines; 2 × electric motors
- Speed: 17.7 knots (32.8 km/h; 20.4 mph) surfaced; 7.6 knots (14.1 km/h; 8.7 mph) submerged
- Range: 8,500 nmi (15,700 km; 9,800 mi) at 10 knots (19 km/h; 12 mph) surfaced; 80 nmi (150 km; 92 mi) at 4 knots (7.4 km/h; 4.6 mph) submerged
- Test depth: 230 m (750 ft); Crush depth: 250–295 m (820–968 ft)
- Complement: 4 officers, 40–56 enlisted
- Armament: 5 × 53.3 cm (21 in) torpedo tubes (four bow, one stern); 14 × torpedoes; 1 × 3.7 cm (1.5 in) Flak M42 AA gun; 2 × twin 2 cm (0.79 in) C/30 anti-aircraft guns

Service record
- Part of: 5th U-boat Flotilla; 22 January 1944 – 31 January 1945; 11th U-boat Flotilla; 1 February – 26 March 1945
- Identification codes: M 46 386
- Commanders: Oblt.z.S. Kurt van Meteren; 22 January – 2 July 1944; Oblt.z.S. Heinz Bhuse; 3 July 1944 – 26 March 1945
- Operations: 1 patrol: 6 February – 26 March 1945
- Victories: 1 merchant ship sunk (362 GRT); 1 merchant ship total loss (7,176 GRT)

German submarine U-399 was a Type VIIC U-boat of Nazi Germany's Kriegsmarine during World War II.

She carried out one patrol. She sank one ship and caused another to be declared a total loss.

She was sunk in the English Channel on 26 March 1945.

== Design ==
German Type VIIC submarines were preceded by the shorter Type VIIB submarines. U-399 had a displacement of 769 tonnes (757 long tons) when at the surface and 871 tonnes (857 long tons) while submerged. She had a total length of 67.10 m (220 ft 2 in), a pressure hull length of 50.50 m (165 ft 8 in), a beam of 6.20 m (20 ft 4 in), a height of 9.60 m (31 ft 6 in), and a draught of 4.74 m (15 ft 7 in). The submarine was powered by two Germaniawerft F46 four-stroke, six-cylinder supercharged diesel engines producing a total of 2,800 to 3,200 metric horsepower (2,060 to 2,350 kW; 2,760 to 3,160 shp) for use while surfaced, two Garbe, Lahmeyer & Co. RP 137/c double-acting electric motors producing a total of 750 metric horsepower (550 kW; 740 shp) for use while submerged. She had two shafts and two 1.23 m (4 ft) propellers. The boat was capable of operating at depths of up to 230 metres (750 ft).

The submarine had a maximum surface speed of 17.7 knots (32.8 km/h; 20.4 mph) and a maximum submerged speed of 7.6 knots (14.1 km/h; 8.7 mph). When submerged, the boat could operate for 80 nautical miles (150 km; 92 mi) at 4 knots (7.4 km/h; 4.6 mph); when surfaced, she could travel 8,500 nautical miles (15,700 km; 9,800 mi) at 10 knots (19 km/h; 12 mph). U-399 was fitted with five 53.3 cm (21 in) torpedo tubes (four fitted at the bow and one at the stern), fourteen torpedoes, one 3.7 cm (1.5 in) Flak M42 and two twin 2 cm (0.79 in) C/30 anti-aircraft guns. The boat had a complement of between forty-four and sixty.

== Service history ==
The submarine was laid down on 12 November 1942 at the Howaldtswerke (yard) at Kiel as yard number 31, launched on 4 December 1943 and commissioned on 22 January 1944 under the command of Oberleutnant zur See Kurt van Meteren.

She served with the 5th U-boat Flotilla from 22 January 1944 and the 11th flotilla from 1 February 1945.

The boat's first patrol was preceded by the short journey from Kiel in Germany to Horten Naval Base (south of Oslo), arriving at the Norwegian port on 28 January 1945.

=== Patrol and loss ===
U-399 departed Horten on 6 February 1945. On 21 March, she torpedoed the Liberty ship James Eagan Layne "about twelve miles off Plymouth". The ship was beached at nearby Whitesand Bay but settled on the bottom; at high water, only her masts and funnel showed. She was declared a total loss.

The boat sank the Dutch-registered Pacific on 26 March 1945. This ship had taken part in Operation Dynamo, the Dunkirk evacuation, in 1940.

U-399 was sunk later on the same day by depth charges from the British frigate HMS Duckworth.

Forty-six men died in U-399; there was one survivor.

== Summary of raiding history ==
Date	Ship Name	Nationality	Tonnage (GRT)	Fate
21 March 1945	James Eagan Layne	United States	7,176	Total loss
26 March 1945	Pacific	Netherlands	362	Sunk

== Bibliography ==
- Busch, Rainer; Röll, Hans-Joachim (1999). German U-boat commanders of World War II : a biographical dictionary. Translated by Brooks, Geoffrey. London, Annapolis, Md: Greenhill Books, Naval Institute Press. ISBN 1-55750-186-6.
- Busch, Rainer; Röll, Hans-Joachim (1999). Deutsche U-Boot-Verluste von September 1939 bis Mai 1945 [German U-boat losses from September 1939 to May 1945]. Der U-Boot-Krieg (in German). Vol. IV. Hamburg, Berlin, Bonn: Mittler. ISBN 3-8132-0514-2.
- Gröner, Erich; Jung, Dieter; Maass, Martin (1991). U-boats and Mine Warfare Vessels. German Warships 1815–1945. Vol. 2. Translated by Thomas, Keith; Magowan, Rachel. London: Conway Maritime Press. ISBN 0-85177-593-4.
- Kemp, Paul (1999). U-Boats Destroyed – German Submarine Losses in the World Wars. London: Arms & Armour. ISBN 1-85409-515-3.
