= German submarine U-3519 =

German World War II submarine

History

Nazi Germany
- Name: U-3519
- Ordered: 6 November 1943
- Builder: Schichau-Werke, Danzig
- Yard number: 1664
- Laid down: 19 September 1944
- Launched: 23 November 1944
- Commissioned: 6 January 1945
- Fate: Sunk by mine on 2 March 1945

General characteristics
- Class & type: Type XXI submarine
- Displacement: 1,621 t (1,595 long tons) surfaced; 2,100 t (2,067 long tons) submerged
- Length: 76.70 m (251 ft 8 in) (o/a)
- Beam: 8 m (26 ft 3 in)
- Height: 11.30 m (37 ft 1 in)
- Draught: 6.32 m (20 ft 9 in)
- Propulsion: Diesel/Electric; 2 × diesel engines, 4,000 PS (2,900 kW; 3,900 shp); 2 × double-acting electric motors, 5,000 PS (3,700 kW; 4,900 shp); 2 × silent running electric motors, 226 PS (166 kW; 223 shp)
- Speed: Surfaced: 15.6 knots (28.9 km/h; 18.0 mph) (diesel); 17.9 knots (33.2 km/h; 20.6 mph) (electric); Submerged: 17.2 knots (31.9 km/h; 19.8 mph) (electric); 6.1 knots (11.3 km/h; 7.0 mph) (silent running motors)
- Range: 15,500 nmi (28,700 km; 17,800 mi) at 10 knots (19 km/h; 12 mph) surfaced; 340 nmi (630 km; 390 mi) at 5 knots (9.3 km/h; 5.8 mph) submerged
- Test depth: 240 m (790 ft)
- Complement: 5 officers, 52 enlisted
- Sensors & processing systems: Type F432 D2 Radar Transmitter; FuMB Ant 3 Bali Radar Detector
- Armament: 6 × bow torpedo tubes; 23 × 53.3 cm (21 in) torpedoes; or 17 × torpedoes and 12 × mines; 4 × 2 cm (0.79 in) C/30 AA guns

Service record
- Part of: 8th U-boat Flotilla; 6 January – 15 February 1945; 5th U-boat Flotilla; 16 February – 2 March 1945
- Identification codes: M 49 699
- Commanders: Kptlt. Richard von Harpe; 6 January – 2 March 1945
- Operations: None
- Victories: None

German submarine U-3519 was a Type XXI U-boat of Nazi Germany's Kriegsmarine during World War II. The Elektroboote submarine was laid down on 19 September 1944 at the Schichau-Werke yard at Danzig, launched on 23 November 1944, and commissioned on 6 January 1945 under the command of Kapitänleutnant Richard von Harpe.

U-3519 was a brand new, high technology electric boat which could run constantly submerged rather than having to surface to recharge her batteries every day the way submarines until that point had had to do. However, these advanced vessels were introduced to the Kriegsmarine only late in 1944, much too late to influence the Battle of the Atlantic, and too late for many of them to serve in an offensive capacity at all.

With the end of the war near, training on U-boats had dropped to a minimum due to lack of fuel, falling morale and the effectiveness of allied attacks on U-boat construction and preparation. The exception to this were the new Type XXI boats, which continued to train in the Baltic Sea. To prevent this, the Royal Air Force dropped thousands of sea mines into German territorial waters, in the hope that submarines entering or leaving harbour or training in shallow waters would be lost on them. This is what destroyed U-3519 on 2 March 1945, when she ran afoul of an air-dropped mine near Warnemünde, in position 54°11′N 12°05′E and sank to the bottom taking all 65 of her crew with her.

== Design ==
Like all Type XXI U-boats, U-3519 had a displacement of 1,621 tonnes (1,595 long tons) when at the surface and 1,819 tonnes (1,790 long tons) while submerged. She had a total length of 76.70 m (251 ft 8 in), a beam of 8 m (26 ft 3 in), and a draught of 6.32 m (20 ft 9 in). The submarine was powered by two MAN SE supercharged six-cylinder M6V40/46KBB diesel engines each providing 4,000 metric horsepower (2,900 kilowatts; 3,900 shaft horsepower), two Siemens-Schuckert GU365/30 double-acting electric motors each providing 5,000 PS (3,700 kW; 4,900 shp), and two Siemens-Schuckert silent running GV232/28 electric motors each providing 226 PS (166 kW; 223 shp).

The submarine had a maximum surface speed of 15.6 knots (28.9 km/h; 18.0 mph) and a submerged speed of 17.2 knots (31.9 km/h; 19.8 mph). When running on silent motors the boat could operate at a speed of 6.1 knots (11.3 km/h; 7.0 mph). When submerged, the boat could operate at 5 knots (9.3 km/h; 5.8 mph) for 340 nautical miles (630 km; 390 mi); when surfaced, she could travel 15,500 nautical miles (28,700 km; 17,800 mi) at 10 knots (19 km/h; 12 mph). U-3519 was fitted with six 53.3 cm (21.0 in) torpedo tubes in the bow and four 2 cm (0.79 in) C/30 anti-aircraft guns. She could carry twenty-three torpedoes or seventeen torpedoes and twelve mines. The complement was five officers and fifty-two men.

== Bibliography ==
- Busch, Rainer; Röll, Hans-Joachim (1999). German U-boat commanders of World War II : a biographical dictionary. Translated by Brooks, Geoffrey. London, Annapolis, Md: Greenhill Books, Naval Institute Press. ISBN 1-55750-186-6.
- Busch, Rainer; Röll, Hans-Joachim (1999). Der U-Boot-Krieg, 1939-1945: Deutsche U-Boot-Verluste von September 1939 bis Mai 1945 [German U-boat losses from September 1939 to May 1945] (in German). Vol. IV. Hamburg, Berlin, Bonn: Mittler. ISBN 3-8132-0514-2.
- Gröner, Erich; Jung, Dieter; Maass, Martin (1991). U-boats and Mine Warfare Vessels. German Warships 1815–1945. Vol. 2. Translated by Thomas, Keith; Magowan, Rachel. London: Conway Maritime Press. ISBN 0-85177-593-4.
- Kemp, Paul (1997). U-Boats Destroyed - German Submarine Losses in the World Wars. London: Arms and Armour Press. p. 235. ISBN 1-85409-321-5.
- Sharpe, Peter (1998). U-Boat Fact File. Great Britain: Midland Publishing. ISBN 1-85780-072-9.
