= USS LST-80 =

LST-1-class landing ship tank

History

United States
- Name: LST-80
- Builder: Jeffersonville Boat and Machine Co., Jeffersonville
- Laid down: 16 March 1943
- Launched: 18 May 1943
- Sponsored by: Mrs. Jane G. Bonnie
- Commissioned: 12 July 1943
- Fate: Transferred to Royal Navy

History

United Kingdom
- Name: LST-80
- Commissioned: 19 July 1943
- Stricken: 11 July 1945
- Fate: Sunk by naval mines, 20 March 1945

General characteristics
- Class & type: LST-1-class tank landing ship
- Displacement: 4,080 long tons (4,145 t) full load; 2,160 long tons (2,190 t) landing
- Length: 328 ft (100 m) oa
- Beam: 50 ft (15 m)
- Draft: Full load: 8 ft 2 in (2.49 m) forward; 14 ft 1 in (4.29 m) aft; Landing at 2,160 t: 3 ft 11 in (1.19 m) forward; 9 ft 10 in (3.00 m) aft
- Installed power: 2 × 900 hp (670 kW) Electro-Motive Diesel 12-567A diesel engines; 1,700 shp (1,300 kW)
- Propulsion: 1 × Falk main reduction gears; 2 × Propellers
- Speed: 12 kn (22 km/h; 14 mph)
- Range: 24,000 nmi (44,000 km; 28,000 mi) at 9 kn (17 km/h; 10 mph) while displacing 3,960 long tons (4,024 t)
- Boats & landing craft carried: 2 or 6 x LCVPs
- Capacity: 2,100 tons oceangoing maximum; 350 tons main deckload
- Troops: 16 officers, 147 enlisted men
- Complement: 13 officers, 104 enlisted men
- Armament: Varied, ultimate armament; 2 × twin 40 mm (1.57 in) Bofors guns; 4 × single 40 mm Bofors guns; 12 × 20 mm (0.79 in) Oerlikon cannons

USS LST-80 was a LST-1-class tank landing ship in the Royal Navy during World War II.

== Construction and career ==
LST-80 was laid down on 16 March 1943 at Jeffersonville Boat and Machine Co., Jeffersonville, Indiana. Launched on 18 May 1943 and commissioned on 7 July 1943. The ship was later transferred to the Royal Navy and commissioned on 19 July 1943. The ship was assigned 9th LST Flotilla.

She took part in the Invasion of Normandy, June 1944.

While underway in Convoy ATM97, she was sunk by two naval mines off Ostend, Belgium, 20 March 1945.

LST-80 was struck from the Navy Register on 11 July 1945.

== Sources ==
- United States. Dept. of the Treasury (1962). Treasury Decisions Under the Customs, Internal Revenue, Industrial Alcohol, Narcotic and Other Laws, Volume 97. U.S. Government Printing Office.
- Moore, Capt. John (1984). Jane's Fighting Ships 1984-85. Jane's Information Group. ISBN 978-0710607959.
- Saunders, Stephen (2009). Jane's Fighting Ships 2009-2010. Jane's Information Group. ISBN 978-0710628886.
- Fairplay International Shipping Journal Volume 222. United Kingdom: Fairplay Publishing Limited. 1967.
