= German submarine U-3508 =

German World War II submarine

History

Nazi Germany
- Name: U-3508
- Ordered: 6 November 1943
- Builder: Schichau-Werke, Danzig
- Yard number: 1653
- Laid down: 25 July 1944
- Launched: 22 September 1944
- Commissioned: 2 November 1944
- Fate: Sunk on 4 March 1945

General characteristics
- Class & type: Type XXI submarine
- Displacement: 1,621 t (1,595 long tons) surfaced; 2,100 t (2,067 long tons) submerged
- Length: 76.70 m (251 ft 8 in) (o/a)
- Beam: 8 m (26 ft 3 in)
- Height: 11.30 m (37 ft 1 in)
- Draught: 6.32 m (20 ft 9 in)
- Propulsion: Diesel/Electric; 2 × MAN M6V40/46KBB supercharged 6-cylinder diesel engines, 4,000 PS (2,900 kW; 3,900 shp); 2 × SSW GU365/30 double-acting electric motors, 5,000 PS (3,700 kW; 4,900 shp); 2 × SSW GV232/28 silent running electric motors, 226 PS (166 kW; 223 shp)
- Speed: Surfaced: 15.6 knots (28.9 km/h; 18.0 mph) (diesel); 17.9 knots (33.2 km/h; 20.6 mph) (electric); Submerged: 17.2 knots (31.9 km/h; 19.8 mph) (electric); 6.1 knots (11.3 km/h; 7.0 mph) (silent running motors)
- Range: 15,500 nmi (28,700 km; 17,800 mi) at 10 knots (19 km/h; 12 mph) surfaced; 340 nmi (630 km; 390 mi) at 5 knots (9.3 km/h; 5.8 mph) submerged
- Test depth: 240 m (790 ft)
- Complement: 5 officers, 52 enlisted
- Sensors & processing systems: Type F432 D2 Radar Transmitter; FuMB Ant 3 Bali Radar Detector
- Armament: 6 × bow torpedo tubes; 23 × 53.3 cm (21 in) torpedoes; or 17 × torpedoes and 12 × mines; 4 × 2 cm (0.79 in) C/30 AA guns

Service record
- Part of: 8th U-boat Flotilla; 2 November 1944 – 15 February 1945; 5th U-boat Flotilla; 16 February – 4 March 1945
- Identification codes: M 46 926
- Commanders: Oblt.z.S. / Kptlt. Detlef von Lehsten; 2 November 1944 – 4 March 1945
- Operations: None
- Victories: None

German submarine U-3508 was a Type XXI U-boat of Nazi Germany's Kriegsmarine during World War II. The Elektroboote submarine was laid down on 25 July 1944 at the Schichau-Werke yard at Danzig, launched on 22 September 1944, and commissioned on 2 November 1944 under the command of Oberleutnant zur See Detlef von Lehsten.

He commanded the U-boat during her entire career, being promoted to Kapitänleutnant during this time. She did not carry out any patrols during her career, spending her entire time in training after having been allocated to the 8th U-boat Flotilla until 15 February 1945, then to the 5th U-boat Flotilla from 16 February until 4 March.

== Design ==
Like all Type XXI U-boats, U-3508 had a displacement of 1,621 tonnes (1,595 long tons) when at the surface and 1,819 tonnes (1,790 long tons) while submerged. She had a total length of 76.70 m (251 ft 8 in), a beam of 8 m (26 ft 3 in), and a draught of 6.32 m (20 ft 9 in). The submarine was powered by two MAN SE supercharged six-cylinder M6V40/46KBB diesel engines each providing 4,000 metric horsepower (2,900 kilowatts; 3,900 shaft horsepower), two Siemens-Schuckert GU365/30 double-acting electric motors each providing 5,000 PS (3,700 kW; 4,900 shp), and two Siemens-Schuckert silent running GV232/28 electric motors each providing 226 PS (166 kW; 223 shp).

The submarine had a maximum surface speed of 15.6 knots (28.9 km/h; 18.0 mph) and a submerged speed of 17.2 knots (31.9 km/h; 19.8 mph). When running on silent motors the boat could operate at a speed of 6.1 knots (11.3 km/h; 7.0 mph). When submerged, the boat could operate at 5 knots (9.3 km/h; 5.8 mph) for 340 nautical miles (630 km; 390 mi); when surfaced, she could travel 15,500 nautical miles (28,700 km; 17,800 mi) at 10 knots (19 km/h; 12 mph). U-3508 was fitted with six 53.3 cm (21.0 in) torpedo tubes in the bow and four 2 cm (0.79 in) C/30 anti-aircraft guns. She could carry twenty-three torpedoes or seventeen torpedoes and twelve mines. The complement was five officers and fifty-two men.

== Fate ==
She was sunk on 4 March 1945 in an Allied bombing raid by US Eighth Air Force B-24 Liberator bombers on Wilhelmshaven.

== Bibliography ==
- Kemp, Paul (1997). U-Boats Destroyed - German Submarine Losses in the World Wars. London: Arms and Armour Press. p. 236. ISBN 1-85409-321-5.
- Busch, Rainer; Röll, Hans-Joachim (1999). German U-boat commanders of World War II : a biographical dictionary. Translated by Brooks, Geoffrey. London, Annapolis, Md: Greenhill Books, Naval Institute Press. ISBN 1-55750-186-6.
- Busch, Rainer; Röll, Hans-Joachim (1999). Der U-Boot-Krieg, 1939-1945: Deutsche U-Boot-Verluste von September 1939 bis Mai 1945 [German U-boat losses from September 1939 to May 1945] (in German). Vol. IV. Hamburg, Berlin, Bonn: Mittler. ISBN 3-8132-0514-2.
- Gröner, Erich; Jung, Dieter; Maass, Martin (1991). U-boats and Mine Warfare Vessels. German Warships 1815–1945. Vol. 2. Translated by Thomas, Keith; Magowan, Rachel. London: Conway Maritime Press. ISBN 0-85177-593-4.
