= German trawler V 315 Bris =

Patrol boats

History
- Name: PT 25 (1941); Bris (1941–45)
- Port of registry: (Nazi Germany) Germany (1941–42); Kriegsmarine (1942–45)
- Builder: Norderwerft Köser & Meyer
- Yard number: 746
- Launched: 14 June 1941
- Commissioned: 3 February 1942
- Out of service: 12 March 1945
- Identification: Pennant Number V 315 (1942–45)
- Fate: Sank in collision

General characteristics
- Type: Minesweeper (as built); Fishing trawler (1941-42); Vorpostenboot (1942–45)
- Tonnage: 589 GRT
- Displacement: 1,250 tons
- Length: 61.00 m (200 ft 2 in)
- Beam: 12.50 m (41 ft 0 in)
- Draught: 4.10 m (13 ft 5 in)
- Depth: 9.00 m (29 ft 6 in)
- Installed power: Triple expansion steam engine
- Propulsion: Single screw propeller
- Speed: 11.5 knots (21.3 km/h)
- Armament: 1 x 75 or 88mm cannon; 2 x 37mm anti-aircraft guns; 4 to 10 20mm machine guns; 6 depth charge throwers

Bris was a German Vorpostenboot that was built in 1941 as the minesweeper PT 25 for the Soviet Navy. She was seized by Germany before delivery and was used as a fishing trawler before being requisitioned by the Kriegsmarine, serving as V 315 Bris. She was lost in a collision in March 1945.

== Description ==
The ship 61.00 metres (200 ft 2 in) long, with a beam of 12.50 metres (41 ft 0 in). She had a depth of 9.00 metres (29 ft 6 in) and a draught of 4.70 metres (15 ft 5 in). She was assessed at 589 GRT. She was powered by a triple expansion steam engine, which drove a single screw propeller. It could propel the ship at 11.5 knots (21.3 km/h).

== History ==
Bris was built as yard number 746 by Norderwerft Köser & Meyer, Hamburg, Germany as the minesweeper PT 25 for the Soviet Navy. She was launched on 14 June 1941. She was seized by Germany on 26 June and was put to use as the fishing trawler Bris. On 3 February 1942, she entered Kriegsmarine service with 3 Vorpostenflotille as the vorpostenboot V 315 Bris. Armament was a 75 or 88mm cannon, two 37mm anti-aircraft guns, four to ten 20mm machine guns and six depth charge throwers. Her displacement was 1,250 tons. She sank in the Baltic Sea off Rixhöft (54°53′N 18°20′E) on 12 March 1945 when she collided with the steamship Hendrik Fisser VII. The wreck lies in 62 metres (203 ft) of water.

== Sources ==
- Gröner, Erich (1993). Die deutschen Kriegsschiffe 1815-1945 (in German). Vol. 8/I: Flußfahrzeuge, Ujäger, Vorpostenboote, Hilfsminensucher, Küstenschutzverbände (Teil 1). Koblenz: Bernard & Graefe. ISBN 3-7637-4807-5.
