= HMS Teme =

River-class frigate of the Royal Navy

History

United Kingdom
- Name: Teme
- Namesake: River Teme
- Builder: Smiths Dock Company, South Bank-on-Tees
- Laid down: 25 May 1943
- Launched: 11 November 1943
- Identification: Pennant number: K458
- Fate: Transferred to Royal Canadian Navy (RCN) 1944; Returned from RCN 1945; Broken up 1946

Canada
- Name: Teme
- Commissioned: 28 February 1944
- Decommissioned: 4 May 1945
- Identification: pennant number: K458
- Fate: Torpedoed 29 March 1945, constructive total loss; Returned to Royal Navy 1945

General characteristics
- Class & type: River-class frigate
- Displacement: 1,460 long tons (1,480 t; 1,640 short tons); 2,180 long tons (2,210 t; 2,440 short tons) (deep load)
- Length: 283 ft (86.26 m) p/p; 301 ft 4 in (91.85 m) o/a
- Beam: 36 ft 8 in (11.18 m)
- Draught: 11 ft 10 in (3.61 m); 12 ft 9 in (3.89 m) (deep load)
- Propulsion: 2 x Admiralty 3-drum boilers, 2 shafts, reciprocating vertical triple expansion, 5,500 ihp (4,100 kW)
- Speed: 20 knots (37.0 km/h); 20.5 knots (38.0 km/h) (turbine ships)
- Range: 646 long tons (656 t; 724 short tons) oil fuel; 7,500 nautical miles (13,890 km) at 15 knots (27.8 km/h)
- Complement: 157
- Armament: 2 × QF 4 in (102 mm) /40 Mk.XIX guns, single mounts CP Mk.XXIII; Up to 10 × QF 20 mm Oerlikon A/A on twin mounts Mk.V and single mounts Mk.III; 1 × Hedgehog 24 spigot A/S projector; Up to 150 depth charges

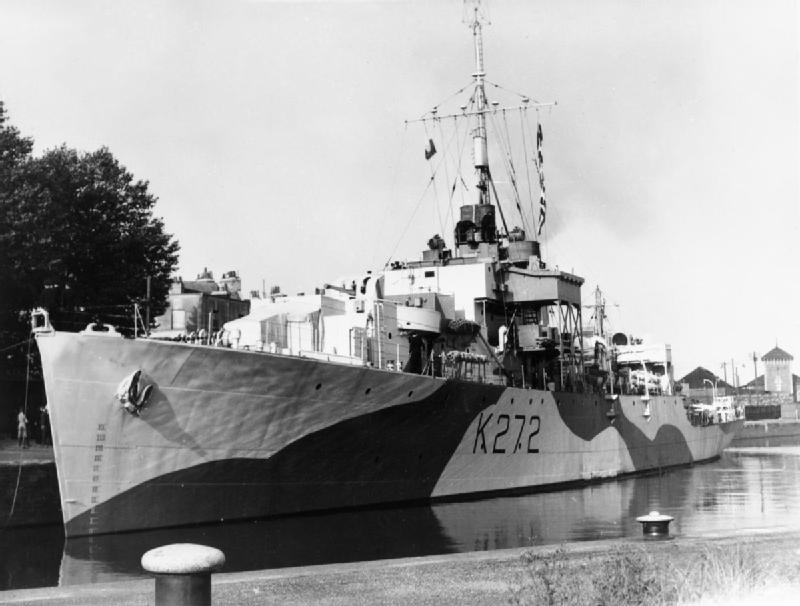
Photograph of River class frigate HMS Tavy, a ship of the same class as HMS Teme.

HMS Teme (K458) was a River-class frigate of the Royal Navy that was built during the Second World War. The frigate was named for the River Teme, a river that flows along the English-Welsh border. She was transferred to the Royal Canadian Navy and served as HMCS Teme. She was torpedoed by a German submarine on 29 March 1945 and subsequently declared a constructive total loss. The ship was broken up in Wales in 1946.

== Design and description ==
The River-class frigate were an improved version of the Flower-class corvette design, intended as ocean-going anti-submarine escorts. They were 100 feet (30 m) longer and had two screws, intended to replace the corvettes that were at the time, performing the convoy escort missions.

The River-class design had a displacement of 1,460 long tons (1,480 t; 1,640 short tons) and 2,180 long tons (2,210 t; 2,440 short tons) at deep load. They were 283 ft (86.26 m) long between perpendiculars and 301 ft 4 in (91.85 m) long overall. The frigates had a beam of 36 ft 8 in (11.18 m) and a draught of 11 ft 10 in (3.61 m), 12 ft 9 in (3.89 m) at deep load.

The frigates were powered by a two-shaft vertical triple expansion engine, using steam from two Admiralty 3-drum boilers. This generated 5,500 indicated horsepower (4,100 kW) and gave the ships a maximum speed of 20 knots (37 km/h; 23 mph). They carried 646 tons of oil.

The ships main armament was two single-mounted QF 4-inch (102 mm)/40 Mk.XIX guns. For anti-air defence they had up to ten QF 20 mm Oerlikon anti-aircraft guns on twin and single mounts. For anti-submarine warfare they were equipped with one Hedgehog 24 spigot projector and up to 150 depth charges.

== Construction and career ==
Teme was laid down by Smiths Dock Company at their shipyard in South Bank-on-Tees and launched on 11 November 1943. In 1943, as part of the Royal Navy's intent to reduce its production of escorts, an agreement was reached between the United Kingdom and Canada that would see the Royal Canadian Navy take over seven River-class frigates building in the United Kingdom. The ship was commissioned into the Royal Canadian Navy on 28 February 1944 at Middlesbrough.

After working up, Teme was assigned to the convoy escort group EG 6, based out of Derry. For the rest of her active career, the ship remained with this unit.

On 6 June 1944, Teme was among the forces arrayed for Operation Overlord, the naval component of the Invasion of Normandy. Teme was among the ships deployed to combat the U-boat threat to the invasion fleet. Escort Group 6 was among the groups assigned to Operation CA, which swept the area of the Atlantic extending from southern Ireland to the Bay of Biscay. The escort group, normally operating out of Derry, transferred to their operating base at Moelfre Bay in Wales on 31 May. On 10 June at roughly 0200, Teme picked up an ASDIC contact and moved to intercept. The escort carrier HMS Tracker, operating with the group, maneuvered at the same time, and both ships put themselves on a collision course. Tracker rammed Teme and nearly cut the ship in half. Teme was towed by sister ship HMCS Outremont to Cardiff where she underwent repairs until December 1944.

Teme traveled to Tobermory for work ups following her repairs and became operational again on 9 February 1945. On 29 March, while escorting the coastal convoy BTC 111 in the English Channel, Teme was hit by a torpedo from a German submarine, blowing off 60 feet (18 m) of her stern. In company with sister ship HMCS New Waterford, the two ships were sweeping for submarines when Teme picked up a contact on her sonar. After failing to find the source of the contact, the ships were returning to the convoy when a torpedo was spotted. The resulting explosion killed four men. The sources disagree on which submarine fired the torpedo, with Macpherson and Barrie stating it was U-246 and Rohwer claiming it was U-315 on page 397, then on page 400, it was U-246.

Towed to Falmouth, the frigate was declared a constructive total loss. The ship was paid off by the Royal Canadian Navy on 4 May 1945 and returned to the Royal Navy. The ship was towed to Llanelly, Wales and broken up in 1946.
