= USS Kete =

Submarine of the United States

Coordinates: 29°53′N 130°21′E

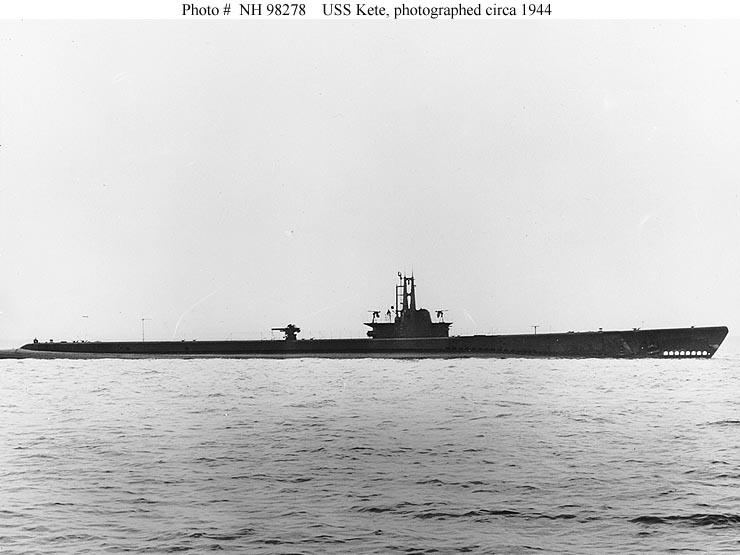

History

United States
- Builder: Manitowoc Shipbuilding Company, Manitowoc, Wisconsin
- Laid down: 25 October 1943
- Launched: 9 April 1944
- Commissioned: 31 July 1944
- Fate: Lost off the Ryukyu Islands around 20 March 1945 with a crew of 87- no survivors.

General characteristics
- Class & type: Balao-class diesel-electric submarine
- Displacement: 1,526 tons (1550 t) surfaced; 2,424 tons (2460 t) submerged
- Length: 311 ft 9 in (95.02 m)
- Beam: 27 ft 3 in (8.31 m)
- Draft: 16 ft 10 in (5.13 m) maximum
- Propulsion: 4 × General Motors Model 16-278A V16 diesel engines driving electrical generators; 2 × 126-cell Sargo batteries; 4 × high-speed General Electric electric motors with reduction gears; 2 × propellers; 5,400 shp (4.0 MW) surfaced; 2,740 shp (2.0 MW) submerged
- Speed: 20.25 knots (37 km/h) surfaced; 8.75 knots (16 km/h) submerged
- Range: 11,000 nm (20,000 km) surfaced at 10 knots (19 km/h)
- Endurance: 48 hours at 2 knots (4 km/h) submerged; 75 days on patrol
- Test depth: 400 ft (120 m)
- Complement: 10 officers, 70–71 enlisted
- Armament: 10 × 21-inch (533 mm) torpedo tubes; 6 forward, 4 aft; 24 torpedoes; 1 × 5-inch (127 mm) / 25 caliber deck gun; Bofors 40 mm and Oerlikon 20 mm cannon

USS Kete (SS-369), a Balao-class submarine, was the only ship of the United States Navy to be named for the kete, the foureye butterflyfish Chaetodon capistratus. Her keel was laid down by Manitowoc Shipbuilding Company of Manitowoc, Wisconsin. She was launched on 9 April 1944 sponsored by Mrs. E. S. Hutchinson, and commissioned on 31 July.

Departing Manitowoc 20 August, Kete sailed via New Orleans, Louisiana, to Panama. Arriving 5 September, she trained with SubRon 3 until 28 September; then the new submarine sailed to Pearl Harbor, arriving 15 October, and steamed westward on 31 October for her first war patrol.

She topped off her fuel at Midway Island on 4 November and reached her assigned patrol area in the East China Sea on 15 November in company with Sea Lion (SS-315). Harassed by heavy weather and nonfunctioning bow planes, she sailed 19 November for Saipan, where she arrived 24 November. She departed Saipan with Kraken (SS-370) on 24 December and resumed her war patrol north of Okinawa four days later. Despite prolonged periods of heavy weather, she made lifeguard patrols off the central Ryukyu Islands from 1 January to 27 January 1945 searching for American fliers downed during air strikes on the Ryukyu Islands. After gathering vital weather data, she sailed to Guam and arrived 30 January for refit.

With Lieutenant Commander Edward Ackerman in command, Kete cleared Guam on 1 March for her second war patrol. Assigned to waters surrounding the Nansei Shoto Chain, she resumed lifeguard duty and gathered weather data for the forthcoming invasion of Okinawa. While patrolling west of Tokara Retto on the night of 9 March and 10 March, she surprised an enemy convoy and torpedoed three marus totaling 6881 tons (the Japanese troop transport Keizan Maru (2116 GRT) and the Japanese army cargo ships Sanka Maru (2495 GRT) and Dokan Maru (2270 GRT)). During the night of 14 March, she attacked a cable-laying ship.

With only three torpedoes remaining, she was ordered to depart the area 20 March, refuel at Midway Island, and proceed to Pearl Harbor for refit. Kete acknowledged these orders 19 March; and, while steaming eastward the following day, she sent in a weather report from a position south of Colnett Strait. She was neither seen nor heard from again. She was scheduled to arrive Midway by 31 March; when repeated attempts to contact her by radio failed she was reported as presumed lost on 16 April.

Circumstances surrounding her loss remain a mystery. The cause could have been an operational malfunction, a mine explosion, or enemy action.

Some Western sources credit the medium-size Japanese submarine Ro-41 (type Kaichū) with the sinking of Kete but the only indisputable fact is that this submarine crossed the same area on the day Kete sent a weather report there. Ro-41 was possibly sunk on 23 March 1945, three days after a supposed kill. It is very unlikely the Japanese captain (Lt Honda) would not report such an attack. It is even emphasized by the last radio contact with Ro-41, happening on 22 March 1945 and mentioning just "sighting an enemy destroyer".

== Possible discovery ==
The actual whereabouts of Kete may have been discovered during a deep-sea dive in 1995. The possibility exists that a U.S. submarine lies in about 1,148 feet (350 m) of water off the coast of Iriomote Island, the far southwest island in the Okinawa chain. During operations with an Okinawan company using a U.S. made "SCORPIO" ROV in 1995, a group of divers encountered a sonar contact with what appeared to be a metal structure, about 20 feet (6.1 m) in girth and about 115 feet (35 m) in length (exposed) at roughly an angle of 20-30 degrees. The SONAR image of a large unexpected obstruction to the operations prompted the divers to command evasive maneuvers and avoid the area for the safety of the ROV. Note some researchers think the submarine lost off Okinawa was the USS Snook lost in April 1945; however the Snook was apparently lost off the China coast while the USS Kete was stationed off Okinawa. Possibly the cause was that of a minefield laid in February 1945

The divers, thinking they would have another opportunity to work in the area at a later date, left the area and never returned to that site. Their ROV was lost in 1997 off Yonaguni Island, the last island belonging to the Okinawa chain off the east coast of Taiwan. They were fairly certain that the object was a submarine, and quite possibly the Kete. No further dives in the area were ever attempted.

Kete received one battle star for World War II service.
