= SS James Eagan Layne =

Liberty ship sunk off Cornwall, now a dive site

- Launching of the James Eagan Layne

History

United States
- Name: James Eagan Layne
- Namesake: James Eagan Layne
- Operator: US Navigation Company, New York City
- Builder: Delta Shipbuilding Corporation, New Orleans, Louisiana
- Yard number: 157
- Laid down: 23 October 1944
- Launched: 2 December 1944
- Completed: 18 December 1944
- Fate: Sunk on 21 March 1945

General characteristics
- Type: Liberty ship
- Tonnage: 7,176 tons
- Length: 422.8 ft (128.9 m)
- Beam: 57 ft (17 m)
- Draft: 27 ft 9.25 in (8.4646 m)
- Propulsion: Two oil-fired boilers, triple-expansion steam engine, single screw, 2,500 hp (1,900 kW)
- Speed: 11 to 11.5 knots (20.4 to 21.3 km/h; 12.7 to 13.2 mph)
- Crew: 69

SS James Eagan Layne was a Liberty ship. She was beached and sunk during the Second World War off Whitsand Bay, Cornwall, United Kingdom.

== History ==
=== Voyages and sinking ===
She was built by the Delta Shipbuilding Corporation, New Orleans, Louisiana in 1944 and was operated by the United States Navigation Company, of New York City. She was named after the second engineer of the Esso Baton Rouge, who was killed when Esso Baton Rouge was sunk by Reinhard Hardegen's U-123 on 23rd February 1943.

The final voyage of the James Eagan Layne was in convoy BTC-103 to carry 4,500 tons of US Army Engineers' equipment from Barry, Wales, to Ghent, in Belgium. She also carried motorboats and lumber as deck cargo. She was sighted on 21 March 1945, sailing 12 miles off Plymouth by U-399 and torpedoed on the starboard side between holds #4 and #5. She was badly damaged, but was taken in tow by tugs Flaunt and Atlas. She was beached in Whitsand Bay Cornwall, but subsequently settled on the bottom and was declared a total loss. There were no casualties amongst her crew of 69.

=== As a wreck ===
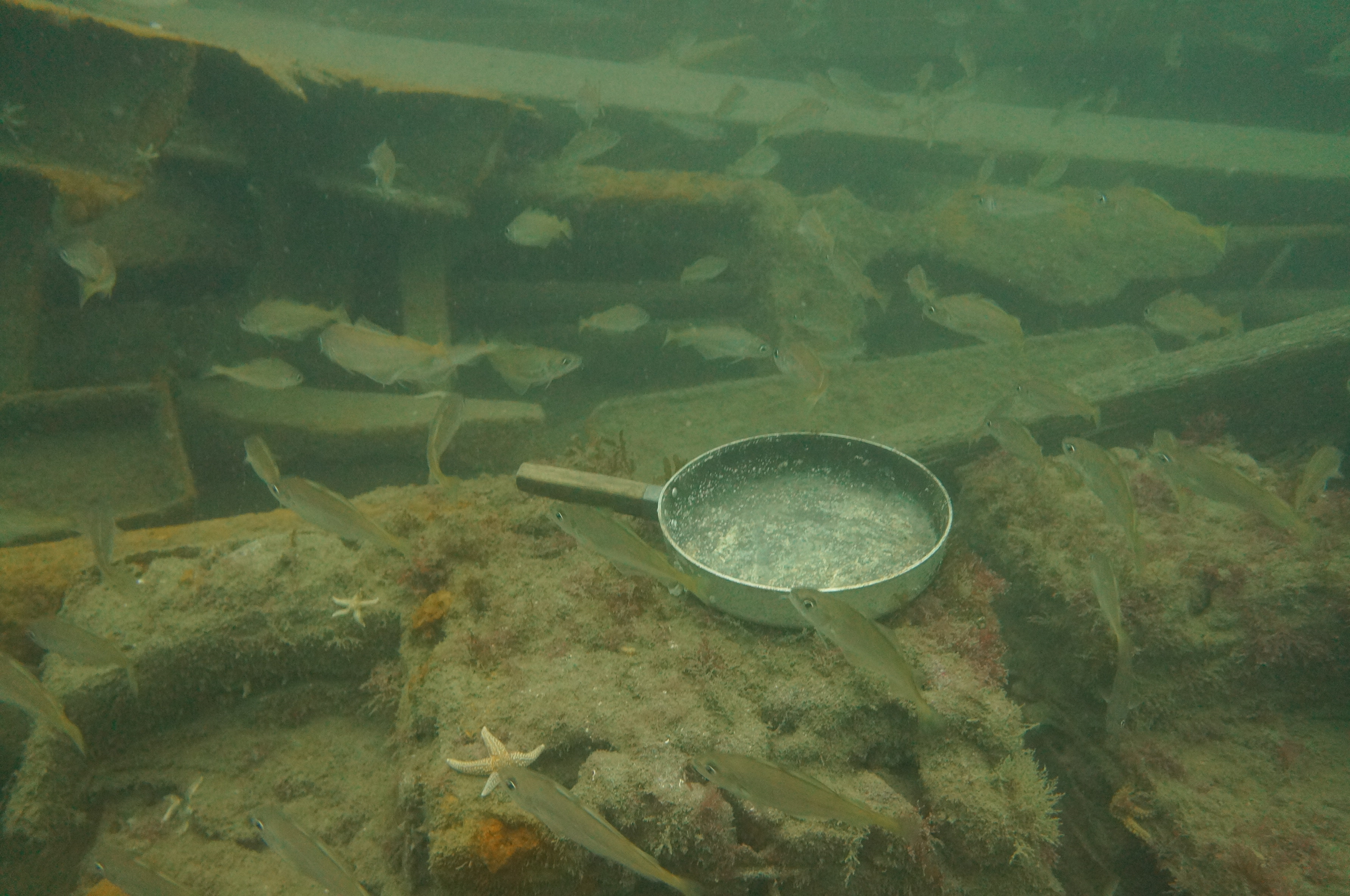
Wreckage of James Eagan Layne in 2014

Some salvage was done at the time of her loss before the forward holds flooded and much of the cargo in the stern section was salvaged by an Icelandic firm in 1953 with further salvage work completed in 1967.

The wreck has been a popular dive site for many years. James Eagan Layne is situated 540 metres (1,770 ft) east of the wreck of HMS Scylla - in 22m of water with her bows at 50°19.602′N 4°14.714′W. In June 2011, three divers got into difficulty on the wreck, resulting in one death.

March 2015 is the 70th anniversary of the sinking of the James Eagan Layne. To celebrate this anniversary, the Liberty 70 Project was started with the aim of researching and documenting all aspects of the life of this vessel - wartime transport, shipwreck, commercial salvage, the classic UK wreck dive and artificial reef.
