= RFA Fort Duquesne =

1944 Fort-class stores ship of the Royal Fleet Auxiliary

- RFA Fort Duquesne in 1945

History

United Kingdom
- Name: RFA Fort Duquesne
- Namesake: Fort Duquesne
- Operator: 1944–1947: Ministry of War Transport; 1947–1967: Royal Fleet Auxiliary
- Builder: West Coast Shipbuilders, Vancouver
- Launched: 28 September 1944
- Commissioned: 25 November 1944
- Decommissioned: April 1967
- Stricken: 1967
- Fate: Scrapped, 1967

General characteristics
- Class & type: Victory-type Fort ship
- Tonnage: 7,220 gross register tons (GRT); 3,911 NRT; 7,720 tonnes deadweight (DWT)
- Length: 439 ft 4 in (133.91 m)
- Beam: 57 ft 2 in (17.42 m)
- Draught: 27 ft (8.2 m)
- Propulsion: 1 × 3-cylinder triple expansion steam engine, 2,500 ihp (1,864 kW); 1 shaft
- Speed: 11 knots (20 km/h; 13 mph)
- Range: 11,400 nmi (21,100 km) at 10 kn (19 km/h; 12 mph)
- Complement: 115
- Armament: World War II : 1 × 4 in (102 mm) gun; 8 × 20 mm AA guns
- Aviation facilities: Fitted with a small landing platform aft

RFA Fort Duquesne (A229) was a Fort ship and later an air stores ship of the Royal Fleet Auxiliary. Originally built as SS Queensborough Park for the Canadian Merchant Navy, the vessel was transferred to the British Ministry of War Transport before completion.

The vessel served in Atlantic convoys for the remainder of the Second World War and was transferred to the Royal Fleet Auxiliary in 1947. She was subsequently used for sea trials of the Westland WS-51 Dragonfly helicopter and played the role of the German tanker Tacoma in the 1956 film The Battle of the River Plate.

== Construction ==
Fort Duquesne was built by West Coast Shipbuilders in Vancouver as SS Queensborough Park for the Canadian Merchant Navy as part of the Canadian government's Park ship program. The vessel was a "Victory" type cargo ship. Before she was completed, the vessel was transferred to the British Ministry of War Transport.

== History ==
=== Second World War ===
On 25 November 1944 she was commissioned by the Ministry of War Transport and renamed Fort Duquesne. She was completed as a refrigerated Victualling Stores Issuing Ship (VSIS) and placed under management of George Nisbet & Company of Glasgow.

On 3 January 1945 she sailed in escorted convoy HX 330 from New York to Tyne. On 25 February 1945 she sailed in escorted convoy ON 287 from the Clyde to Panama. On 22 November 1946 sailed Sydney to Hong Kong with a cargo of 160 tons of frozen meat. On 19 March 1947 she passed Gibraltar sailing on to Trincomalee, Ceylon and to Plymouth. On 24 March 1947 arrived at Plymouth Sound from Hong Kong and Colombo.

=== Post war ===
The ship was transferred to the British Royal Fleet Auxiliary on 16 September 1947. On 31 January 1951 and 4 February 1951 she did sea trials off Isle of Portland and Plymouth UK using Dragon Fly helicopters from RNAS Gosport and RNAS Culdrose. The trials were conducted with 705 Naval Air Squadron in the English Channel using two Dragonfly HR1 helicopters. The helicopters used were Dragonfly VX598 and Dragonfly VZ963.

In 1955 she starred in the film The Battle of the River Plate, playing the German freighter Tacoma, which took the crew off the cruiser Admiral Graf Spee before she was scuttled off Montevideo.

=== Fate ===
Fort Duquesne was decommissioned in April 1967 and put in reserve at Chatham. She arrived at the Scheldt for demolition at Tamise on 29 June 1967.

During World War II, 28 were lost to enemy action, and four were lost due to accidents. Many of the surviving 166 ships passed to the United States Maritime Commission. The last recorded scrapping was in 1985, and two ships, the former Fort St. James and Fort St. Paul, were listed on Lloyd's Register until 1992.

== See also ==
- RFA Fort Charlotte (A236)
- RFA Fort Langley (A230)
- RFA Fort Rosalie (A186)
- Fort Cataraqui (ship)
