= RFA Fort Charlotte =

1948 Fort-class stores ship of the Royal Fleet Auxiliary

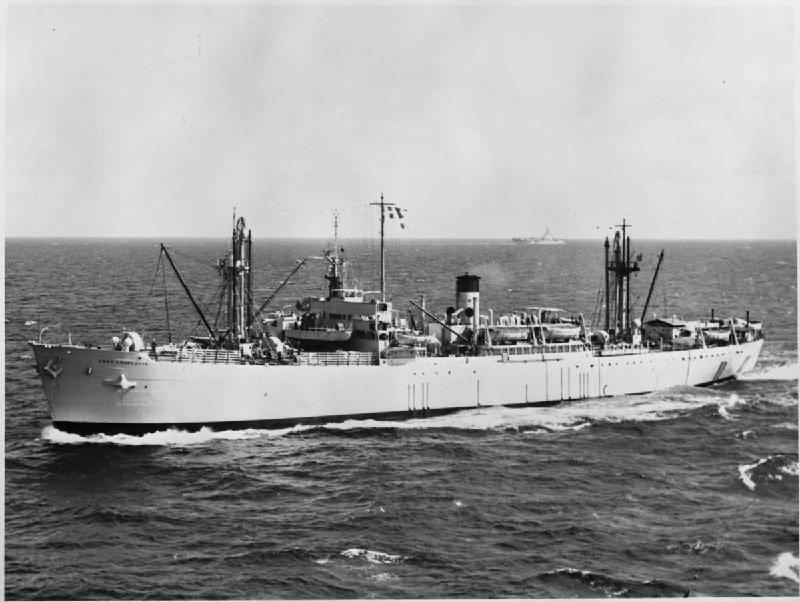

History

Canada
- Name: RFA Fort Charlotte
- Launched: 12 February 1944, as Buffalo Park
- Acquired: 1945
- Commissioned: 11 June 1948
- Decommissioned: 1967
- Renamed: Fort Charlotte, 1945
- Fate: Sold for scrapping, January 1968

General characteristics
- Tonnage: 7,201 gross register tons (GRT); 3,791 NRT; 8,572 tonnes deadweight (DWT)
- Length: 441 ft 6 in (134.57 m)
- Beam: 57 ft 2 in (17.42 m)
- Draught: 27 ft (8.2 m)
- Propulsion: 1 × 3-cylinder triple expansion steam engine, 2,500 ihp (1,864 kW); 1 shaft
- Speed: 11 knots (20 km/h; 13 mph)
- Range: 11,400 nmi (21,100 km) at 10 kn (19 km/h; 12 mph)
- Complement: 115
- Armament: World War II : 1 × 4 in (100 mm) gun; 8 × 20 mm AA guns

RFA Fort Charlotte (A236) was a stores issuing ship of the Royal Fleet Auxiliary.

Launched on 12 February 1944 as SS Buffalo Park a merchant steamship constructed for Canada’s Merchant Navy in 1944 during the Second World War as part of Canada's Park ship program. The ship was acquired by the Ministry of War Transport in 1945 and renamed Fort Charlotte, a Fort ship. The ship was transferred to the RFA on 11 June 1948. Decommissioned in 1967, she was sold to Singapore breakers in January 1968. During World War II, 28 were lost to enemy action, and four were lost due to accidents. Many of the surviving 166 ships passed to the United States Maritime Commission. The last recorded scrapping was in 1985, and two ships, the former Fort St. James and Fort St. Paul, were listed on Lloyd's Register until 1992.

== See also ==
- RFA Fort Langley (A230)
- RFA Fort Duquesne (A229)
- RFA Fort Rosalie (A186)
- Fort Cataraqui (ship)
