= SS Victoria Park =

Canadian cargo ship

History

Canada
- Name: Victoria Park
- Namesake: Victoria Park, Truro, Nova Scotia
- Owner: Canadian Government
- Port of registry: Canada
- Builder: Pictou Shipyard, Pictou, Nova Scotia
- Launched: April 27, 1943
- Out of service: 1982
- Fate: Scrapped in Brazil, 1982

General characteristics
- Tonnage: 2,878 GRT; 1,653 NRT
- Length: 315 ft 5 in (96.14 m)
- Beam: 46 ft 5 in (14.15 m)
- Depth: 22 ft 9 in (6.93 m)
- Installed power: Triple expansion steam engine
- Propulsion: Screw propeller
- Crew: 34, plus 4 DEMS gunners
- Armament: 1 x 4 inch deck gun aft; 1 x 3 inch (76 mm)/50 caliber gun; 4 x 20 mm Oerlikon; 2 x Twin .50 cal. Machine Guns; 20 x Rail Anti-Aircraft Rocket Launcher (Pillar Box)

SS Victoria Park was a general cargo steamship built in 1943, the first of 24 wartime Park Ships that were built in the Pictou Shipyard in Pictou, Nova Scotia, in the 1940s. Victoria Park was built by Foundation Maritime Ltd., 27 April 1943. Built as a merchant steamship constructed for Canada's Merchant Navy. and was originally built for the government of Canada's use as a cargo vessel.

== History ==
Victoria Park was the first steam ship built at the new Pictou Shipyard. In the tradition of naming Park Ships after Canadian parks, she was named for Victoria Park in nearby Truro, Nova Scotia. The ship was launched on 27 April 1943. She made multiple crossings of the Atlantic carrying supplies to Europe during the Battle of the Atlantic.

Victoria Park also had a long postwar career changing owners and names numerous times until it was finally scrapped in Brazil in 1982.

=== Other names ===
After the war she was sold and renamed. She was subsequently renamed a number of times:

- Tatuk, 1946
- Kalo, 1948
- Ester, 1957
- San John P., 1964
- Ramsdal I, 1965
- Rio Atrato, 1966

== Park Ships ==
Park Ships were merchant steamships constructed for Canada's Merchant Navy during World War II. Park ships were the Canadian equivalent of the American Liberty Ships and the British Fort Ships. All three shared a similar design by J.L. Thompson and Sons, of Sunderland, England.

== See also ==
- Park ships
