= SS Green Hill Park =

Freighter disaster

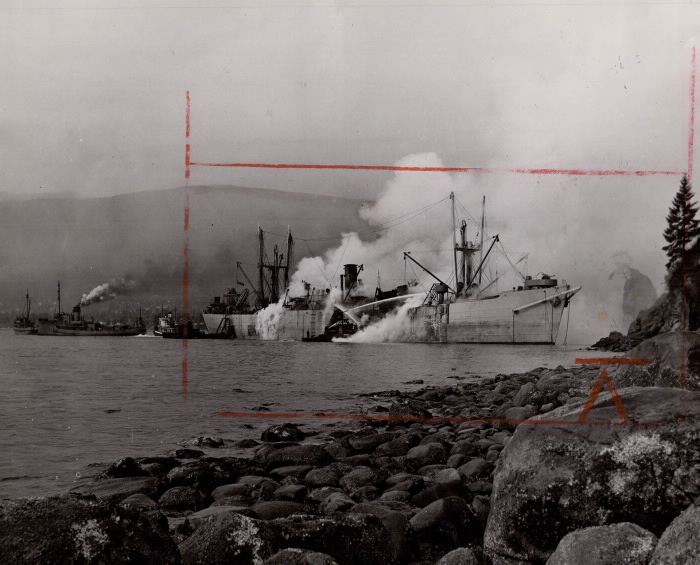
- Firefighters beached Green Hill Park on Vancouver's Siwash Point, in 1945

History

Canada
- Name: Green Hill Park
- Owner: Park Steamship Company
- Launched: 1943
- Fate: Exploded, and burst into flames, 6 March 1945; Repaired and sold to Panama, 1946

Panama
- Name: Phaeax II; Lagos Michigan
- Fate: Broken up in Taiwan, 1967

General characteristics
- Tonnage: 2,878 GRT; 1,653 NRT
- Length: 315 ft 5 in (96.14 m)
- Beam: 46 ft 5 in (14.15 m)
- Depth: 22 ft 9 in (6.93 m)
- Installed power: Triple expansion steam engine
- Propulsion: Screw propeller
- Crew: 34, plus 4 DEMS gunners
- Armament: 1 x 4-inch deck gun aft; 1 x 3-inch (76 mm)/50-caliber gun; 4 x 20 mm Oerlikon; 2 x Twin .50 cal. machine buns; 20 x rail anti-aircraft rocket launcher (Pillar Box)

SS Green Hill Park was a freighter, built in 1943, that exploded, bursting into flames, in Vancouver, British Columbia's harbour, on March 6, 1945. According to a 2013 retrospective article in the Vancouver Sun, this was Vancouver's worst disaster at the time.

Green Hill Park was owned by the Park Steamship Company, which was in turn owned by the Canadian Federal government, which built 400 vessels during World War II. The ship was named after a park in Nova Scotia and built as a merchant steamship, and constructed for Canada's Merchant Navy in 1943 during the Second World War as part of Canada's Park ship program.

She was operated for the Government by Canada Shipping Company.

== Explosion at Vancouver ==
The ship's cargo included 85 or 95 tons of sodium chlorate, commonly used for bleaching pulp, that, under certain conditions, can be a powerful high explosive. Observers saw three explosions, and, initially, it was believed that portions of the ship's cargo of sodium chlorate exploded. Her cargo also included six tons of flares, and barrels of overproof whiskey.

The ship was being loaded at a Canadian Pacific Railway pier, and six longshoremen, along with two seamen, lost their lives. Windows were broken all over Vancouver's downtown as result of the explosion. Vancouver firefighters could not extinguish the blaze, so they beached her, near Siwash Rock, in Stanley Park, to prevent her drifting into other vessels, and setting them on fire.

The Vancouver Sun reported that, eventually, some longshoremen confessed that they had clandestinely tapped the whisky barrels, and it was the spilled whisky that accidentally ignited, and started the fire. John Stanton, reporting in the Northern Mariner, wrote that the whisky was 60% alcohol, which was fifty percent more alcohol than normal whisky. He wrote that those unfamiliar with it may not have understood that the fumes from overproof alcohol are far more volatile, and explosive, than regular whisky.

== Reconstruction and renaming ==
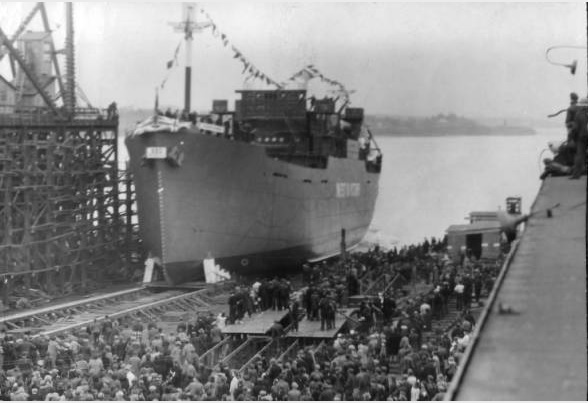
A typical Park ship. Launch of SS Ashby Park at the Pictou Shipyard in 1944.

Green Hill Park was severely damaged, but she was repaired, sold off, and operated again under Panamaian ownership as Phaeax II. She was recommissioned as Phaeax II in 1946, and as Lagos Michigan in 1956. She was scrapped in Taiwan, in 1967.

== See also ==
- Park ship
