= A186 =

A186 may refer to:

- A186 road (England), a road connecting Newcastle upon Tyne and North Shields
- A186 road (Malaysia), a road in Perak connecting TLDM Lumut Naval Base and Simpang empat Teluk Muroh
- RFA Fort Rosalie (A186), a 1944 armament stores carrier of the Royal Fleet Auxiliary
