= SS Fort Cataraqui =

WWII Allied cargo ship

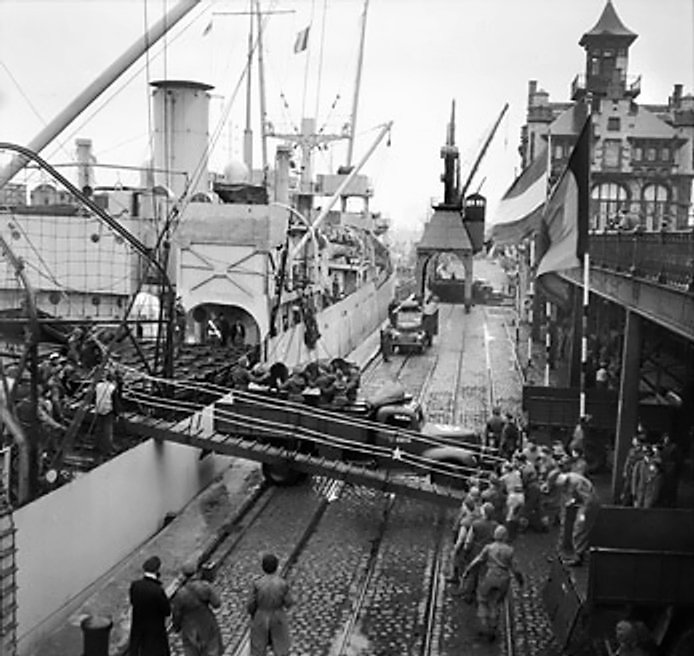
- SS Fort Cataraqui in the port of Antwerp

History
- Name: Fort Catarqui
- Builder: Davie Shipbuilding, Lauzon
- Launched: 15 September 1942
- Acquired: October 1942
- Fate: Scrapped 1960

General characteristics
- Tonnage: 7,201 gross register tons (GRT); 3,791 NRT; 8,572 tonnes deadweight (DWT)
- Length: 441 ft 6 in (134.57 m)
- Beam: 57 ft 2 in (17.42 m)
- Draught: 27 ft (8.2 m)
- Propulsion: 1 × 3-cylinder triple expansion steam engine, 2,500 ihp (1,864 kW); 1 shaft
- Speed: 11 knots (20 km/h; 13 mph)
- Range: 11,400 nmi (21,100 km) at 10 kn (19 km/h; 12 mph)
- Complement: 115
- Armament: World War II : 1 × 4 in (100 mm) gun; 8 × 20 mm AA guns

SS Fort Cataraqui was a North Sands-type Fort ship. The North Sands type, along with similar Park, Fort, and Canadian Liberty classes were essentially British and Canadian variants of the American Liberty and Victory classes. Fort Cataraqui is notable for being the first Allied ship to enter the port of Antwerp after the Canadian First Army cleared the Scheldt Estuary during the Battle of the Scheldt in the Second World War.

The vessel was built by Davie Shipbuilding & Repair Company, in Lauzon, Quebec and was delivered in October 1942. Fort Cataraqui survived the war and was broken up in 1960 in Mobile, Alabama. During World War II, 28 were lost to enemy action, and four were lost due to accidents. Many of the surviving 166 ships passed to the United States Maritime Commission. The last recorded scrapping was in 1985, and two ships, the former Fort St. James and Fort St. Paul, were listed on Lloyd's Register until 1992.

== See also ==
- RFA Fort Langley (A230)
- RFA Fort Charlotte (A236)
- RFA Fort Duquesne (A229)
- RFA Fort Rosalie (A186)
