= SS Taber Park =

Park ship freighter

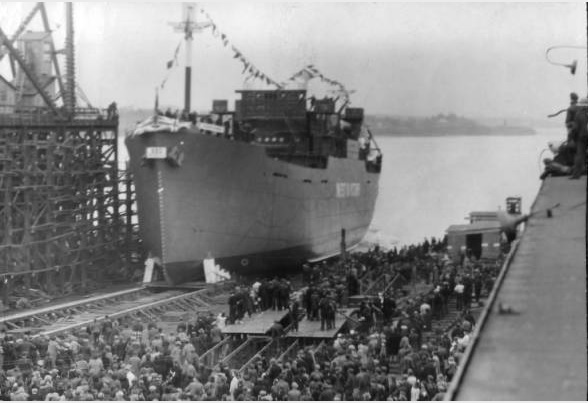
- A typical Park ship being launched

History

Canada
- Name: Taber Park
- Namesake: Taber Park
- Owner: Park Steamship Company
- Builder: Pictou Shipyard
- Launched: 15 June 1944
- Completed: 28 August 1944
- Fate: Torpedoed and sunk on 13 March 1945

General characteristics
- Tonnage: 2,878 GRT; 1,653 NRT
- Length: 315 ft 5 in (96.14 m)
- Beam: 46 ft 5 in (14.15 m)
- Depth: 22 ft 9 in (6.93 m)
- Installed power: Triple expansion steam engine
- Propulsion: Screw propeller
- Crew: 34, plus 4 DEMS gunners
- Armament: 1 x 4-inch deck gun aft; 1 x 3-inch (76 mm)/50-caliber gun; 4 x 20 mm Oerlikon guns; 2 x Twin .50 cal. machine guns; 20 x Rail Anti-Aircraft Rocket Launcher (Pillar Box)

Taber Park was a Park ship freighter, built in 1944. She was sunk by torpedo from a German submarine U-boat on 13 March 1945. She was completed on 28 August 1944, by the company Foundation Maritime, in the Pictou Shipyard in Pictou County, Nova Scotia, Canada. Her hull # is 16. The ship was owned by the Park Steamship Company, which was owned by Canada's Federal government. The government had built 400 vessels during World War II. Built as a merchant steamship constructed for Canada's Merchant Navy in 1944. She was named after an actual park in Canada, in the province of Alberta. She was operated for the Government by Canada Shipping Company. Taber Park should not to be taken as the Tabor Park a Norway cargo ship that was torpedoed, shelled and sunk in the Indian Ocean on 9 March 1943.

== World War II ==
Taber Park was on a voyage from Port of Tyne to London with coal. She was part of convoy FS1753. She was torpedoed and sunk in the North Sea (52°22′N 1°53′E) by a Kriegsmarine midget submarine. She rest off Aldeburgh near Great Yarmouth. Of her crew there were only three survivors. Lost were 24 crew and 4 gunners. Her captain for the voyage was J.J. Parsons, one of the survivors. The lost are remembered in The Royal Canadian Naval Ships Memorial Monument in Spencer Smith Park in Burlington, Ontario.

A typical Park ship docked in 1943

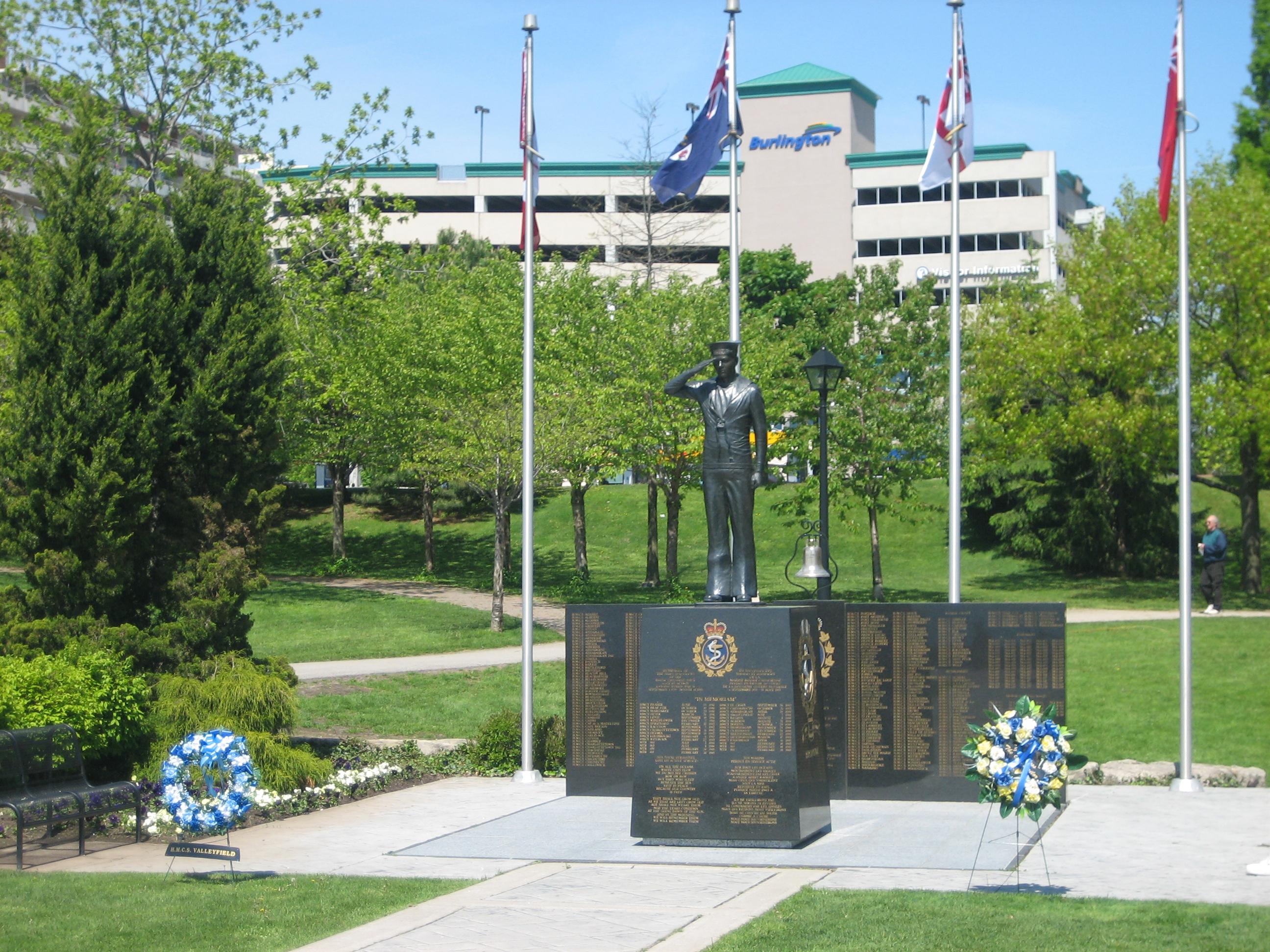
WWII Navy Memorial in Spencer Smith Park in Burlington, Ontario

== Crew ==
British and Canadian merchantmen carried volunteer naval gunners called Defensively equipped merchant ship or DEMS gunners. The American ships carried Naval Armed Guard gunners. Merchant seamen crewed the merchant ships of the British Merchant Navy which kept the United Kingdom supplied with raw materials, arms, ammunition, fuel, food and all of the necessities of a nation at war throughout World War II literally enabling the country to defend itself. In doing this they sustained a considerably greater casualty rate than almost every branch of the armed services and suffered great hardship. Seamen were aged from fourteen through to their late seventies.

== See also ==
- Allied technological cooperation during World War II
- Empire ships
- List of Liberty ships
