= Park ship =

Class of cargo ship built in Canada during World War II

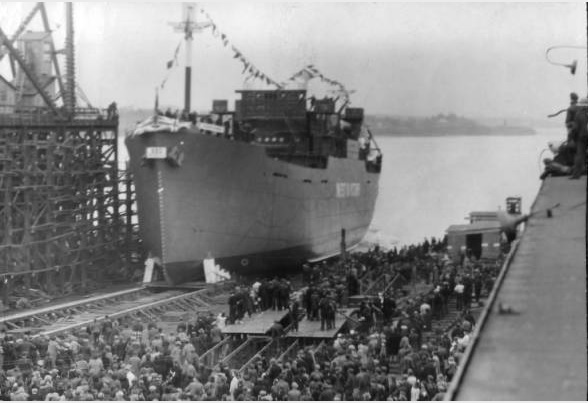
- Launch of SS Ashby Park at the Pictou Shipyard in 1944

Class overview
- Name: Park ship

General characteristics
- Type: Cargo ship
- Tonnage: 2,878 GRT; 1,653 NRT; 10,000 DWT
- Length: 440 ft 0 in (134.11 m)
- Beam: 57 ft 0 in (17.37 m)
- Depth: 22 ft 9 in (6.93 m)
- Installed power: Triple expansion steam engine
- Propulsion: Screw propeller
- Crew: 34, plus 4 DEMS gunners
- Armament: 1 x 4 inch/50 caliber deck gun aft; 1 x 3 inch (76 mm)/50 caliber gun; 4 x 20 mm Oerlikon; 2 x twin .50 cal. machine guns; 20 x rail anti-aircraft rocket launcher (pillar box)

Park ships were merchant steamships constructed for the Canadian Merchant Navy during the Second World War. Park ships and Fort ships (built in Canada for operation by the British) were the Canadian equivalent of the American Liberty ships. All three shared a similar design by J. L. Thompson and Sons of Sunderland, England. Fort ships had a triple expansion steam engine and a single screw propeller. While Fort ships were transferred to the British government, the Park ships were those employed by the Canadian government. The ships were named after local and national parks of Canada. A few Park ships were launched as Camp ships, named after Canadian military camps, but were quickly renamed after parks. Jasper Park was the first Park ship lost to enemy attack, in the Indian Ocean after a torpedo attack from U-177 south of Durban, South Africa.

== Park Steamship Company ==
The Allied merchant fleet suffered significant losses in the early years of the Battle of the Atlantic as a result of U-boat attacks. The Park Steamship Company was created by the Canadian government on April 8, 1942, to oversee construction of a merchant fleet to help replace the lost vessels and to administer the movement of materiel. This was part of a coordinated Allied effort that saw the construction of British, American and Canadian merchant ships using a common class of vessel known as the North Sands class (named after a beach near the J. L. Thompson yard on the River Wear).

== Vessels ==
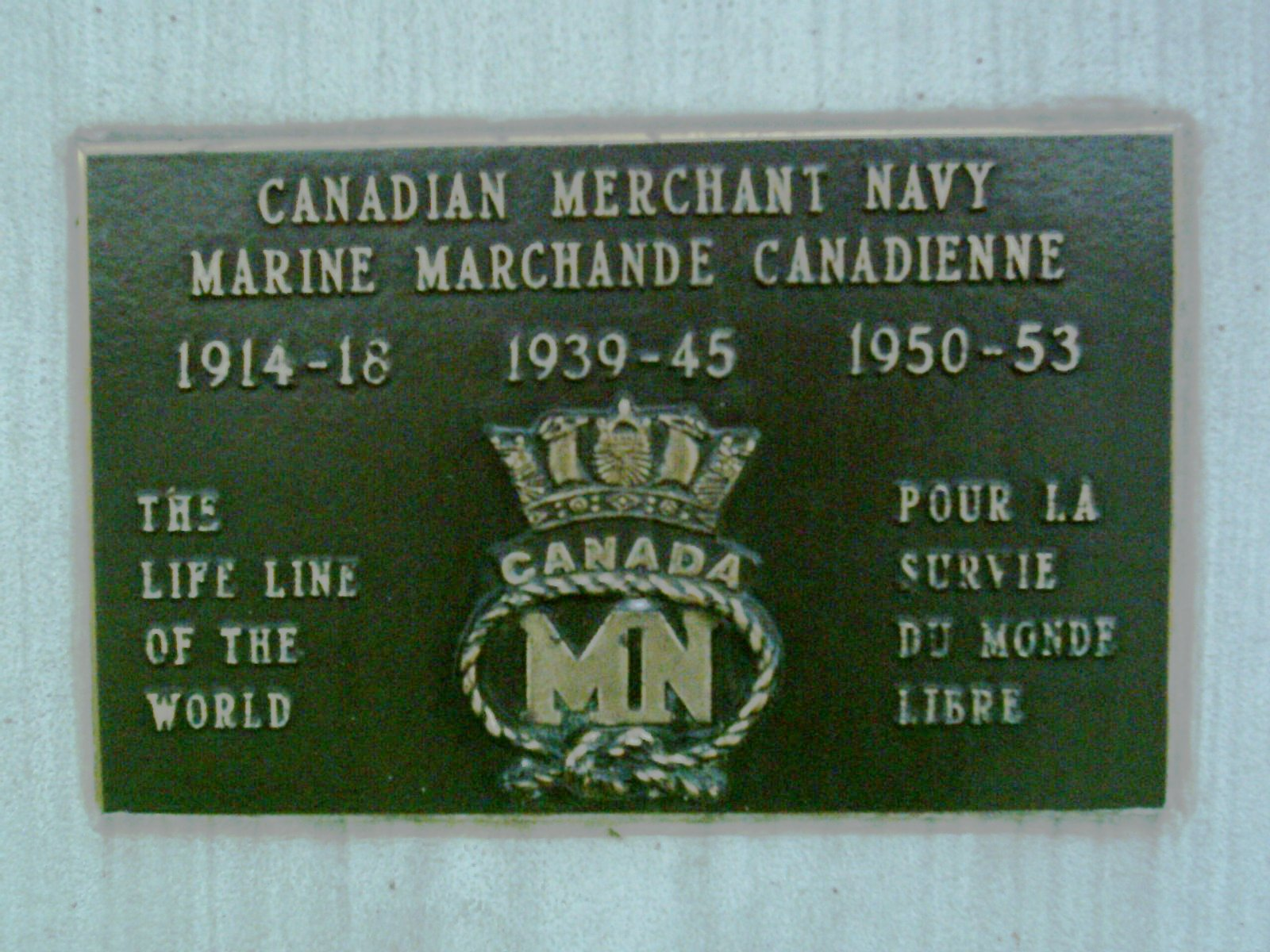
Plaque commemorating the Canadian Merchant Navy

Over the next three years, the company ordered approximately 160 bulk cargo ships and 20 tankers that would all fly the Canadian flag. Ships at 10,000 tons deadweight were known as Park class. 43 smaller vessels at a nominal 4,700 tons were first designated Grey class, but were later called Park ships as well, and were commonly known as 4700-tonner Park ships. All the ships were powered by coal-driven steam engines. All but two vessels launched were named for federal, provincial or municipal parks in Canada. Some were armed with bow guns and anti-torpedo nets. Two of the Park ships were lost to natural hazards and four were lost due to enemy action. One, Avondale Park, built at the Pictou Shipyard in Pictou, Nova Scotia was one of two Allied ships destroyed by enemy action in the North Sea in the last hour of the war in Europe on 7 May 1945.

At the same time, Canada produced 90 additional vessels for the American government which were turned over to the British Merchant Navy under a lend-lease agreement. Built to the same design but designed to burn oil instead of coal, these vessels were known as Fort ships, as they took their names from forts. Notable ships of this type included Fort Cataraqui, Fort Rosalie, and Fort Charlotte. Like many of the Fort ships, Fort Charlotte was launched as a Park. The hulls of the Park ships were riveted, not welded.

After the war, by 1948, all of the Fort ships had been sold to private companies. The new owners gave the ships new names.

Park ship radio room

SS Brentwood Bay Park tanker ship in Victoria, Canada in 1945

== Crew ==
Park ships were armed. There were merchant seamen gunners. Also many British and Canadian merchantmen carried naval gunners as Defensively equipped merchant ship (DEMS). The guns were operated by Royal Navy or Royal Artillery Maritime Regiment personnel with the civilian crews trained to aid in passing ammunition and loading. The American ships carried Naval Armed Guard gunners. Merchant seamen crewed the merchant ships of the British Merchant Navy which kept the United Kingdom supplied with raw materials, arms, ammunition, fuel, food and all of the necessities of a nation at war throughout World War II literally enabling the country to defend itself. In doing this they sustained a considerably greater casualty rate than almost every branch of the armed services and suffered great hardship. Seamen were aged from fourteen through to their late seventies. The lost are remembered in the Royal Canadian Naval Ships Memorial Monument in Spencer Smith Park in Burlington, Ontario.

== Shipyards ==
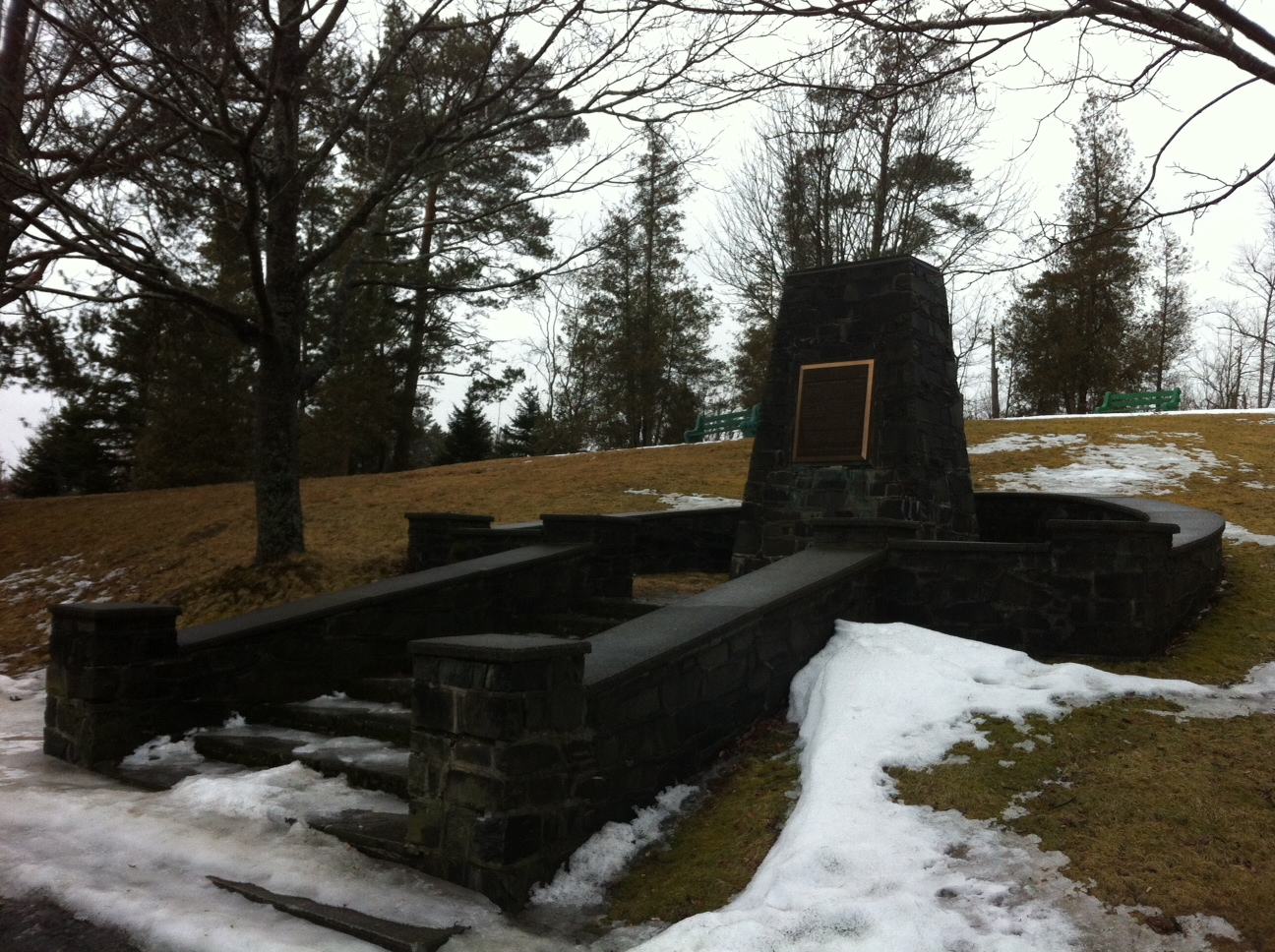
Monument to SS Point Pleasant Park in her namesake park in Halifax, Nova Scotia. The vessel was built at the Davie Shipyard in Montreal.

The shipbuilding program was not easy to implement as Canada had only four operational shipyards with nine berths in 1940. By 1943, there were six additional shipyards and a total of 38 berths. These were all private shipyards located across Canada - on the East Coast at Pictou and Saint John; in Montreal, Sorel and Lauzon on the St. Lawrence River, at Collingwood on the Georgian Bay, and Victoria, Vancouver and Prince Rupert on the Pacific Coast. Only the yards at Montreal, Saint John, Victoria and Collingwood existed before the war. By 1945, there were 57,000 men and women employed in building or repairing merchant ships in Canada and several thousand more building ships for the Royal Canadian Navy.

The table shows the name of the shipyard and city, and the number of vessels launched by each yard. Eventually thousands of Canadians and British would serve aboard these Canadian Merchant Navy ships.

Shipyard	City	Vessels launched
Burrard Dry Dock	North Vancouver, BC	24
North Van Ship Repair	North Vancouver, BC	18
Prince Rupert Dry Dock & Shipyard	Prince Rupert, BC	6
Victoria Machinery Depot	Victoria, BC	11
West Coast Shipbuilders	Vancouver, BC	24
Canadian Vickers	Montreal, QC	1
Davie Shipbuilding & Repair	Lauzon, QC	16
Foundation Maritime Pictou Shipyard	Pictou, NS	24
Marine Industries Limited	Sorel, QC	18
Morton Engineering and Dry Dock Company	Quebec	4
Saint John Dry Dock Company	Saint John, NB	8
United Shipyards	Montreal, QC	25
Collingwood Shipyards	Collingwood, ON	3
Total		182

== Ships in class ==
=== Park-type cargo ships ===
- Albert Park
- Alder Park
- Alexandra Park
- Algonquin Park
- Atwater Park
- Banff Park
- Beaton Park
- Belwoods Park
- Bowness Park
- Bridgeland Park
- Buffalo Park
- Champlain Park
- Chippewa Park
- Connaught Park
- Cornish Park
- Coronation Park
- Cromwell Park
- Crystal Park
- Dentonia Park
- Dominion Park
- Dorval Park
- Dundurn Park
- Dunlop Park
- Earlscourt Park
- Eastwood Park
- Elgin Park
- Elk Island Park
- Elm Park
- Fairmount Park
- Frontenac Park
- Garden Park
- Gaspesian Park
- Gatineau Park
- Glacier Park
- Goldstream Park
- Grafton Park
- Green Gables Park
- Green Hill Park
- Hampstead Park
- Hastings Park
- High Park
- Highland Park
- Hillcrest Park
- Jasper Park
- Kawartha Park
- Kildonan Park
- Kitsilano Park
- Kootenay Park (I)
- Kootenay Park (II)
- La Salle Park
- Lafontaine Park
- Lakeside Park
- Lakeview Park
- Laurentide Park
- Leaside Park
- Louisbourg Park
- Mewata Park
- Mission Park
- Mohawk Park (I)
- Mohawk Park (II)
- Montebello Park (I)
- Montebello Park (II)
- Mount Douglas Park
- Mount Orford Park
- Mount Robson Park (I)
- Mount Robson Park (II)
- Mount Revelstoke Park
- Nemiskam Park
- Noranda Park
- Outremont Park
- Parkdale Park
- Point Pleasant Park
- Port Royal Park
- Portland Park
- Prince Albert Park
- Princeton Park
- Queens Park
- Queensborough Park
- Richmond Park
- Rideau Park
- Riding Mountain Park
- Riverdale Park
- Rocky Mountain Park
- Rondeau Park
- Rosedale Park
- Runnymede Park
- Rupert Park
- Salt Lake Park
- Sapperton Park
- Seacliff Park
- Selkirk Park
- Seven Oaks Park
- Sibley Park
- Simcoe Park
- Stanley Park
- Strathcona Park
- Sunalta Park
- Sunnyside Park
- Tecumseh Park
- Temagami Park
- Tipperary Park
- Tobiatic Park
- Tuxedo Park
- Tweedsmuir Park
- Wascana Park
- Waverley Park
- Wellington Park
- Westbank Park
- Westend Park
- Westmount Park
- Weston Park
- Westview Park
- Whiterock Park
- Whiteshell Park
- Windermere Park
- Winnipegosis Park
- Winona Park
- Withrow Park
- Yamaska Park
- Yoho Park (I)
- Yoho Park (II)

=== Modified Scandinavian-class cargo ===
- Ainslie Park
- Argyle Park
- Ashby Park
- Avondale Park
- Baldwin Park
- Bell Park
- Beresford Park
- Bloomfield Park
- Cartier Park
- Cataraqui Park
- Chignecto Park
- Confederation Park
- Crescent Park
- Dartmouth Park
- Dufferin Park
- Evangeline Park
- Fawkner Park
- Hamilton Park
- Hector Park
- Kelowna Park
- Kensington Park
- Lansdowne Park
- Liscomb Park
- Lorne Park
- Maisonneuve Park
- Manitou Park
- Mayfair Park
- Montmorency Park
- Mulgrave Park
- Oakmount Park
- Rockcliffe Park
- Rockland Park
- Rockwood Park
- Shakespeare Park
- Sunset Park
- Sutherland Park
- Taber Park
- Taronga Park
- Victoria Park
- Wentworth Park
- Westdale Park
- Willow Park
- Woodland Park

=== Park-type tankers ===
- Brentwood Bay Park
- Clearwater Park
- Cypress Hills Park
- Mount Maxwell Park
- Mount Royal Park
- Point Pelee Park

=== Park-type tankers, Great Lakes Trading ===
Tankers for World War II, converted to cargo ships after the war:

- Arlington Beach Park
- Eglington Park
- Millican Park
- Moose Mountain Park
- Mount Bruce Park
- Nipiwan Park
- Norwood Park
- Otterburn Park
- Quetico Park
- Springbank Park
- Silver Star Park
- Wildewood Park
- Willowdale Park

== Lost in action ==
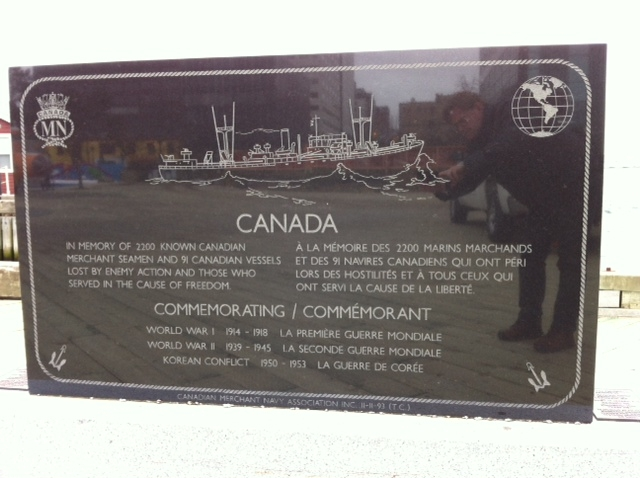
Engraving of SS Point Pleasant Park, Canadian Merchant Navy Monument, Sackville Landing, Halifax, Nova Scotia

SS Jasper Park 1943

- SS Jasper Park was the first Park ship lost to enemy action when torpedoed near Madagascar. Four of the crew were killed. HMAS Quiberon and HMAS Quickmatch rescued 45 crew and 6 DEMS gunners.
- SS Point Pleasant Park was torpedoed near Cape Town, South Africa on February 23, 1945, with nine crew lost.
- SS Taber Park sank in the North Sea on March 13, 1945, after German midget U-boat attack (the two-man Seehund type). Four gunners and 24 crew were killed out of the 32 persons on board, the crew was British. She was southeast of Great Yarmouth in England.
- The SS Avondale Park sank by U-boat on May 7, 1945, while under charter to Ministry of War Transport. Two men were killed and there were 39 survivors. Avondale Park was the last Allied ship lost to German submarines during the war.

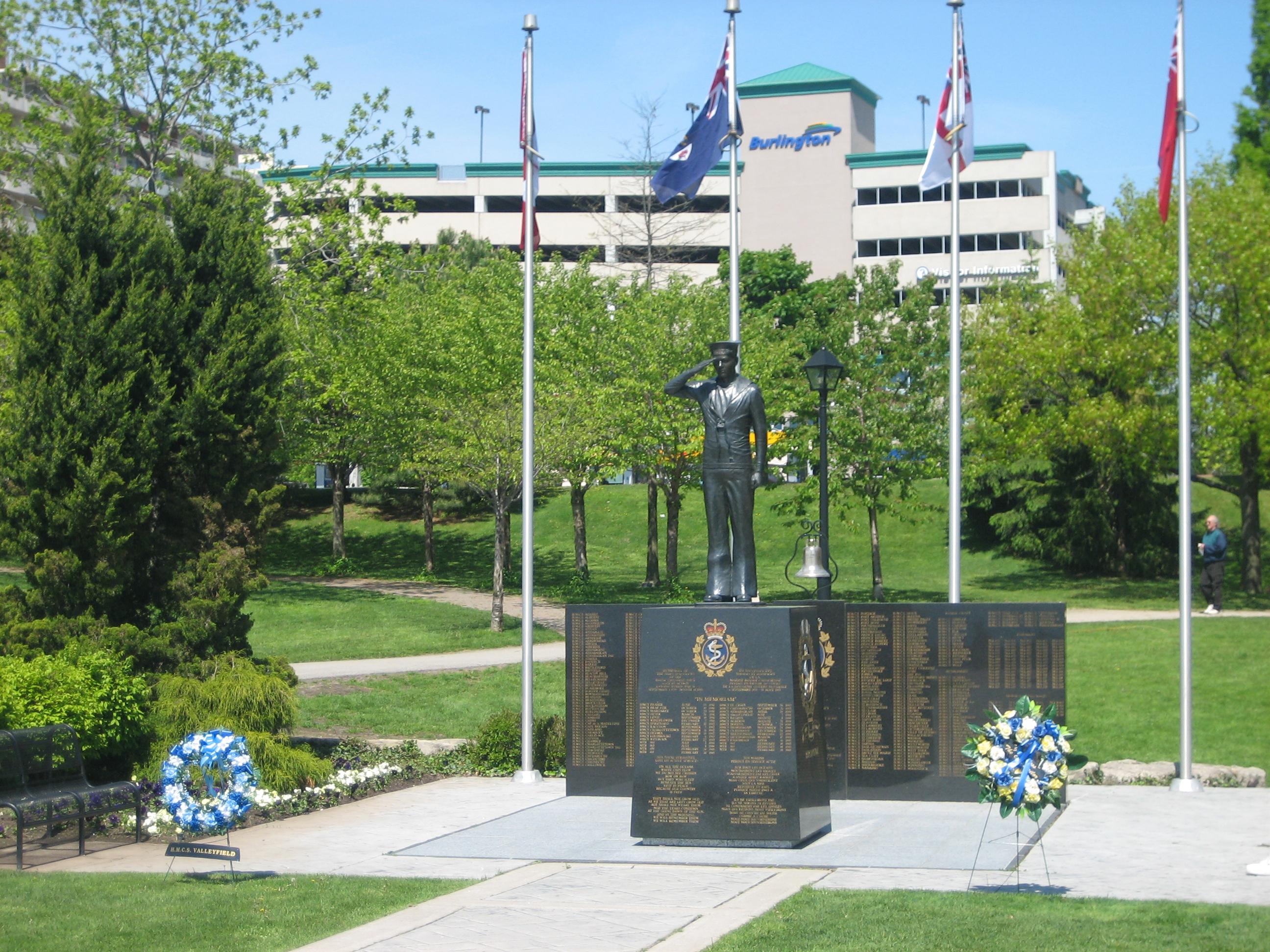
WWII Navy Memorial in Spencer Smith Park in Burlington, Ontario

== Notable incidents ==
Park ships sank or damaged:

Engine Fireman on the deck of a Park Ship in 1945

Sign on the SS Stanley Park Merchant Ship at dock in October 1945 in Freetown, Sierra Leone. Three officer cadets Bob Pethick (left) and Doug McPherson (right). All three wear white uniforms intended for the tropics or hot summer weather. Ship boards names are hinged in the middle, kept folded while at sea and were opened when ship is at port.

- Green Hill Park had an explosion on March 6, 1945, two seamen lost their lives at Vancouver Harbor.
- Yoho Park (I) sold and renamed Darfield in 1950, ran aground in fog near Los Angeles and scrapped in 1954.
- Lakeside Park sold in 1952 renamed Theodora was wrecked in 1958 in the Gulf of Kutch on a reef.
- Queens Park sold in 1964 renamed Mount Othrys and wrecked in 1968 near Port Okhra, India.
- Weston Park sold in 1960 renamed Silver Valley and was wrecked in the River Douro bar, Porto, Portugal in 1963.
- Lansdowne Park sold and renamed Caribbean Trader in 1958 and wrecked on Scorpion Reef, Mexico in 1963.
- Dufferin Park sold in 1946 and renamed Dufferin Bell and was wrecked at the mouth of the Framboise River in Cape Breton Nova Scotia in 1951.
- Crescent Park sold in 1967 renamed Manos Lemos and was wrecked in Gulf of Kuşadası, Turkey in 1969.
- Montmorency Park sold in 1948 renamed Docteur Angier and wrecked in 1949 of Yoron, Kagoshima.
- Kensington Park sold in 1948 renamed Docteur Yersin and was wrecked in 1953 on sandbank near Dong, South Korea.
- Ainslie Park sold in 1966 renamed Dong San and was wrecked in 1972 near Mukoh, South Korea.
- Wentworth Park sold in 1965 renamed Azar and was wrecked off West Punta Brava, Cuba in 1968.
- Taronga Park sold in 1975 renamed Merian and was wrecked off Othoni, Greece in 1977
- Silver Star Park sold in 1951 renamed Ilha Grande and was wrecked of Manoel Luiz Reef near Rio de Janeiro in 1962.
- Atwater Park sold 1953 renamed Halcyon broke in two after collision with Japanese Gen-ei Maru in Kanmon Strait, then scrapped.
- Banff Park sold in 1961 renamed Xenophon stranded near Brest, France on 26 Oct 1962 and later sank in March 1963.
- Beresford Park sold in 1948 renamed Gerda Toft on 23 Dec. 1954 sank in heavy seas in 54.20N 02.32W off Isle of May in Scotland.
- Champlain Park sold in 1959 renamed Vinkon grounded on 1 Sep.1962 in typhoon at Hong Kong then scrapped at Hong Kong.
- Cromwell Park sold in 1948 renamed Amaryllis on 7 Sep. 1965 sank on Riviera Beach, Florida in hurricane.
- Earlscourt Park sold in 1954 renamed Noutsi, on 28 March 1965 ran aground in fog off Constanța, Romania and abandoned.
- Elm Park sold in 1962 renamed Pella on 31 July 1964 was wrecked off Amrum Island of Germany.
- Elk Island Park sold in 1971 renamed Lightening in 1976 damaged by mine at Chalna Port, later scrapped at Chittagong, Bangladesh.
- Gaspesian Park sold in 1954 renamed Polyxeni in 1965 ran aground off Vitoria, Brazil later scrapped at Valencia.
- Kitsilano Park sold in 1950 renamed Harry Lundeberg on 8 Feb. 1954 was wrecked off Cape San Lucas, Baja California
- Mount Douglas Park on 19 Aug. 1946 was wrecked on Preparis Shoal in the Bay of Bengal on voyage from Calcutta to Vancouver.
- Nipiwan Park sold in 1952 renamed Irvinglake on Nov. of 1963 ran aground near Bathurst, New Brunswick
- Norwood Park sold in 1980 renamed Witsupply II on Sep. of 1989 ran aground off St. Maarten in the Caribbean, was refloated and scuttled.
- Prince Albert Park sold in 1951 renamed Champlain, on 26 June 1955 was wrecked in typhoon at Yulin, Hainan Island on voyage from Whampoa to Yulin.
- Simcoe Park sold in 1960 renamed Shun Fung on 5 Sep. 1964 was wrecked in Hong Kong after breaking from moorings in typhoon.
- Westbank Park on 7 Oct. 1945 ran aground in Magdalena Bay, Baja California.
- Westmount Park sold in 1950 renamed Nordicstar on 27 Dec. 1956 reported in location as middle of the North Atlantic Ocean, then went missing. Was on voyage from Philadelphia to Le Havre with load of coal.
- Winnepegosis Park sold in 1949 renamed Aghia Aanastasia on 22 June 1950 ran aground off Tobago on voyage from Baltimore to Rio de Janeiro. She was refloated but sank on 25 June.

== See also ==
- Allied technological cooperation during World War II
- Empire ship
- Lists of Liberty ships
