= Victoria Park, Truro, Nova Scotia =

Park in Truro, Nova Scotia, Canada

Coordinates: 45°21′4.68″N 63°15′58.12″W

Victoria Park
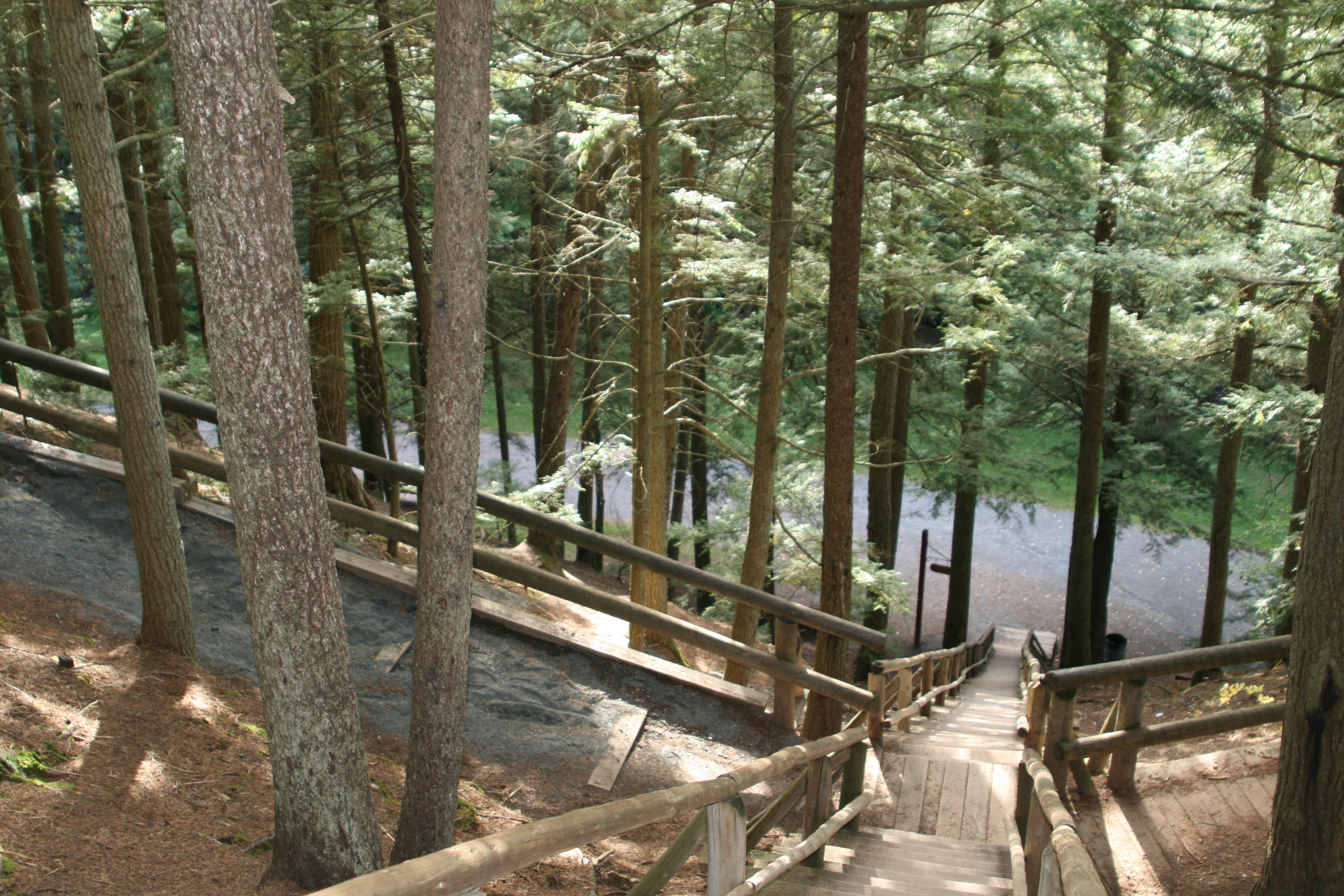
- View from Jacob's Ladder, a popular attraction in Victoria Park.
- Interactive map of Victoria Park
- Type: Urban park
- Location: Truro, Nova Scotia, Colchester County, Nova Scotia
- Nearest city: Truro
- Area: 1,000 acres (4.0 km^{2})
- Established: 1887
- Operator: Town of Truro
- Status: Open year-round
- Website: www.truro.ca/victoria-park.html

Victoria Park is a 3,000-acre (12 km^{2}) natural woodland urban park in the center of Truro, Nova Scotia, Canada. The park features an extensive system of walking, hiking and cycling trails, many of which can be accessed for snowshoeing and cross-country skiing during the winter months, and is a popular year-round attraction. Victoria Park is administered by the Town of Truro and is Nova Scotia's largest municipal park.

== Natural Setting ==
Situated along a hill occupying the southern edge of the Salmon River valley near the town's southeastern boundary, the park is dominated by Lepper Brook, which joins the Salmon River downstream from the park near the town's business district. Within the park, the northward flowing Lepper Brook follows a dramatic gorge which is carved out of the hill and features two waterfalls (Joseph Howe Falls and Waddell Falls).

Most of Victoria Park is heavily forested with vegetation typical of the New England–Acadian Forest region. Some areas of the park preserve rare stands of old-growth eastern hemlock, including individual trees that are 250 years old.

== History ==
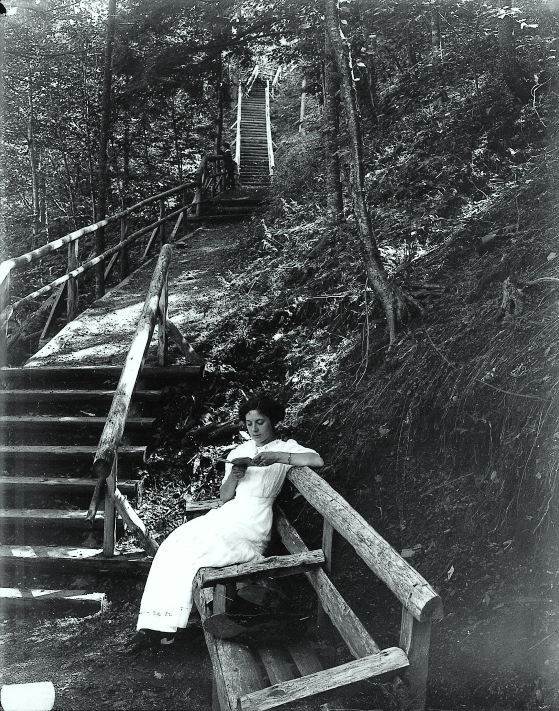
Woman in Victoria park, ca. 1915.

The park was established in 1887 when Susan Waddell Stevens donated 25 acres (100,000 m^{2}) of land for the creation of a public park. The town of Truro formed a board of trustees and named Sir Adams G. Archibald as chairperson; the park was named Victoria Park in honour of Queen Victoria, the monarch at that time. In 1888, the park was enlarged by six additional donations of adjacent land parcels. Subsequent donations over the next century would enlarge the park to its present 1,000 acres (4.0 km^{2}).

In 1901, the board of trustees was renamed and incorporated as the Victoria Park Board of Trustees. The town introduced a set of by-laws for the park in 1913 which included controls against private business use, impact to wildlife, firearms, alcohol, profanity and speed limits of vehicles.

In 1943, the park provided the namesake for the ship SS Victoria Park, a wartime freighter built at the Pictou Shipyard which served in the Battle of the Atlantic in World War II.

Until the early 1980s, it was possible for park visitors to reach deeper areas of the park on paved roads with motor vehicles. However, due to vandalism done by some young people, who used vehicles to facilitate their crimes, these areas were closed off to all motor vehicle use. These paved roads still exist, and are used by park maintenance staff when needed.

The park suffered some damage from Hurricane Juan in 2003. Several trees were damaged, leading to various methods being considered to repair the damage, without causing more damage to the old-growth forest in the process. The park received yet another blow in late September 2022 that when Hurricane Fiona tore through the park leaving behind the remnants of the old growth forests.

In 2010, WorldCan Inc., a New Brunswick-based company which was a franchise operator for Quebec-based TreeGo, contacted the town to propose locating an aerial adventure business within Victoria Park in the Lepper Brook gorge. Truro Town Council rejected the proposal for the original site but followed up with a proposed location at the upper end of Wood Street near the town reservoir. The TreeGo proposal generated considerable controversy with a grassroots campaign by opponents including protest marches, social media, petitions and letter writing; most opponents cited the importance of preserving Victoria Park under the original vision of the Victoria Park Board of Trustees, which was the reason for how the old-growth forest developed in the park in the first place. Supporters of the TreeGo proposal cited economic development potential of such a tourist attraction for the town.

== Development ==
The forested part of the park through the Lepper Brook gorge, as well as the forested hills on each side, hosts a variety of challenging walking and hiking trails. Extensive boardwalks have been built to protect steep hillsides from pedestrian-induced erosion near the Joseph Howe Falls (named after Nova Scotia premier Joseph Howe) and the Waddell Falls (named after the park's founder). A locally-famous route to vantage points above the waterfalls is Jacob's Ladder, a wooden staircase comprising 175 steps up the side of Lepper Brook's gorge.

Several crushed gravel multi-use bicycle and walking paths have been graded on more gently sloped areas in the forested part of the park and are groomed for Nordic skiing in the winter season. The Dr. Jim Vibert Memorial Trail is a hiking trail which covers the upland area beyond the gorge, extending to the edge of the Town of Truro's reservoir.

The Railyard Mountain Bike Park, located on the southern end of Victoria Park, was developed specifically for mountain biking. This area features several biking trails of various difficulty ratings, and built infrastructure including ramps and jumps for use by bikers.

In 2024, a local vendor began operations in Victoria Park offering rental accommodations constructed from shipping containers.

The northern edge of the park bounded by Adams Street is a flat open area in a protected valley that has been developed with the following facilities:

- Victoria Park Outdoor Pool (funded by the local Kinsmen Club and the town of Truro) includes a toddlers pool, children's water spray park, water slides, and a large swimming pool for lane swimming and diving.
- Victoria Park Playground (also funded by the Kinsmen Club and the town of Truro).
- Public washroom facilities.
- J. Arch Fraser Bandshell which hosts the Sunday in the Park Concert Series every Sunday during the summer.
- Tennis courts, operated by the Truro Tennis Club.
- Picnic Pavilion.
- Ross Monument, honouring a local barrister who volunteered many years to the park's enlargement and improvement.
- Holy Well, replica of an early Acadian well from the area.

== See also ==
- Royal eponyms in Canada
