= SS Point Pleasant Park =

History

Canada
- Name: SS Point Pleasant Park
- Owner: Furness Withy (Canada) Ltd, Montreal
- Operator: Park Steamship Co Ltd (1943); Witherington & Everett (1944)
- Port of registry: Montreal
- Builder: Davie Shipbuilding, Lauzon
- In service: 8 November 1943
- Fate: Torpedoed and sunk, 23 February 1945

General characteristics
- Tonnage: 2,878 GRT; 1,653 NRT
- Length: 315 ft 5 in (96.14 m)
- Beam: 46 ft 5 in (14.15 m)
- Depth: 22 ft 9 in (6.93 m)
- Installed power: Triple expansion steam engine
- Propulsion: Screw propeller
- Crew: 34, plus 4 DEMS gunners
- Armament: 1 x 4 inch deck gun aft; 1 x 3 inch (76 mm)/50 caliber gun; 4 x 20 mm Oerlikon; 2 x Twin .50 cal. Machine Guns; 20 x Rail Anti-Aircraft Rocket Launcher (Pillar Box)

SS Point Pleasant Park was a merchant steamship constructed for Canada's Merchant Navy in 1942 during the Second World War as part of Canada's Park ship program. She carried a variety of wartime cargoes to Atlantic and Indian Ocean ports until the German submarine U-510 sank her off the coast of South Africa on 23 February 1945 as Point Pleasant Park was sailing independently from Saint John, New Brunswick to Cape Town. Point Pleasant Park was the last vessel sunk in South African waters during the Second World War.

== Construction ==
Point Pleasant was built by the Canadian Park Steamship Company Limited, a Crown Corporation set up in 1942 to aid the Allied war effort by building and operating cargo ships to replace those lost to enemy action and ensure an ample flow of supplies to Allied forces. The ship was a 10,000 ton version of the Canadian Park ship program, a design similar to the American Liberty ships. She was built at Davie Ship Building & Repair Co. Ltd. at Lauzon, Quebec and entered service the 8 November 1943. The ship was named after Point Pleasant Park in Halifax, Nova Scotia, following the tradition of naming Park ships after Canadian wilderness and recreation parks.

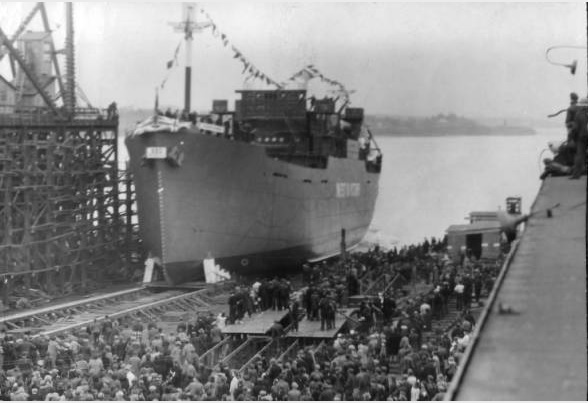
A typical Park ship: launch of SS Ashby Park at the Pictou Shipyard in 1944

== Career ==
Point Pleasant had mostly British officers, led by Captain John Everall, but otherwise the crew were Canadian. She left Montreal on 5 December 1943, bound for Cape Town, South Africa. She stopped at Halifax for minor engine repairs and while there, the mayor of Halifax, John Lloyd, presented Captain Everall, with a framed picture of the ornate gates to Point Pleasant which was hung in the officer's dining room aboard the ship. The Halifax Herald featured the ship on its front page in honour of the connection between the city's landmark park and the war effort. The ship left Halifax in a convoy on 9 December 1943, stopping at New York City and then Port of Spain, Trinidad where she refueled and continued in convoy. Off the coast of Brazil, she was detached from the convoy to sail alone to Cape Town arriving in early February 1944. The ship then called on Port Elizabeth, East London, Durban in South Africa and Beira, Mozambique before returning to Cape Town with a cargo of sugar. Point Pleasant sailed next to Lagos, Nigeria and collected a cargo of palm oil, peanuts and cocoa for Montreal where she arrived on 19 June 1944. Most of her crew re-enlisted for her second voyage, an indication of a happy ship, and she left Montreal on 3 July 1944 repeating a similar voyage in convoy as far as Brazil and then unescorted to Cape Town, East London and Durban before loading a cargo of manganese ore from Takoradi, Ghana which she delivered to Philadelphia. Point Pleasant arrived in Saint John, New Brunswick on 18 December 1944. There Captain Everall took another command.

Evarall's replacement was Captain Owen Owen. Point Pleasant left Saint John on 8 January 1945 for her final voyage carrying general cargo. She travelled in convoy to New York and Trinidad before she was separated from convoy protection off the coast of Brazil on 11 February 1945, bound for Cape Town.

== The attack ==
On the 23 February 1945, at approximately 14:00, Point Pleasant Park was sailing independently approximately 500 miles (800 km) north west of Cape Town, South Africa, when U-510, skippered by Kapitänleutnant Alfred Eick, found her. U-510 was en route to Germany with a load of tungsten from the Far East when she encountered Point Pleasant Park.

U-510 fired on Point Pleasant Park at 29°42′S 09°58′E. A torpedo from U-510 hit Point Pleasant Park in the area of the quarters for the engine-room crew. The explosion immediately killed eight of the crew and trapped 38 others below. The 38 crew were eventually rescued by the officers with only 6 inches (15 cm) of air space left in their compartment.

Twenty minutes after the torpedo struck Owen gave the order to abandon ship. Forty-nine men took to the sea in three open boats. The boats moved off and stood by. Ten minutes later U-510 surfaced, fired two bursts from her 37mm AA gun into the waterline of the bow to flood the forward holds, and then moved off on the surface in a westerly direction. As the submarine moved off, Owen attempted to return to his ship but before the crew could get alongside Point Pleasant sank. As she sank, hull stress caused the steam whistle to sound in a long final salute.

This class of "Park" ship carried four life boats, two small ones on either side of the Captain's deck, just below the bridge, and two larger ones on either side of the engine room. The smaller boats could hold about twelve people and the larger ones about twenty. The smaller one on the port side of the bridge was manned by the First Mate and a designated crew. The boat on the starboard side was commanded by the Third Mate. The large boat on the port side of the engineroom was the Captain's, and had an engine. The fourth boat was the Second Mate's.

== The rescue ==
The torpedo blast had destroyed the ship's radio antenna so no distress call could be sent out. The lifeboats plotted a course for the coast of South West Africa (today known as Namibia), over 300 miles (480 km) away. The two life boats soon lost sight of each other. In one boat 21 sailors were crowded in space made for 11 or 12. Daily rations were 2 ounces of water per man, two spoons of pemmican (hard grain mixed with fat), two biscuits and a small piece of chocolate. The overcrowded boats endured blistering sun and survived a significant storm. The survivors were comforted when the Southern Cross constellation, which appeared each night, showed they were on course.

Captain Owens and 19 crew members made landfall at Mercury Island on South West Africa's Skeleton Coast on 2 March. There the fishing vessel Boy Russell found them, and took them to the harbour town of Lüderitz, South West Africa. The South African naval trawler HMSAS Africana found the other lifeboat on 4 March, north of Spencer Bay. Africana landed the 29 crew members she had rescued, many injured, at the South African exclave of Walvis Bay. After recovery in hospital, the survivors went by rail to Cape Town and eventually made their way back to Canada via the United States.

== Commemoration ==
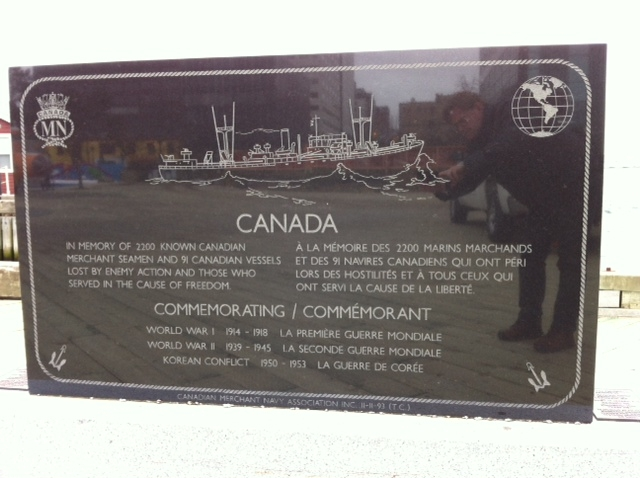
Engraving of SS Point Pleasant Park, Canadian Merchant Navy Monument, Sackville Landing, Halifax, Nova Scotia

Commander Owens received the OBE on 3 December 1946. The British Empire Medal was awarded to five crew members: Laurant Girard, Robert Korogi, Edgar Proctor, Frank Rosendaal, and John Slade.

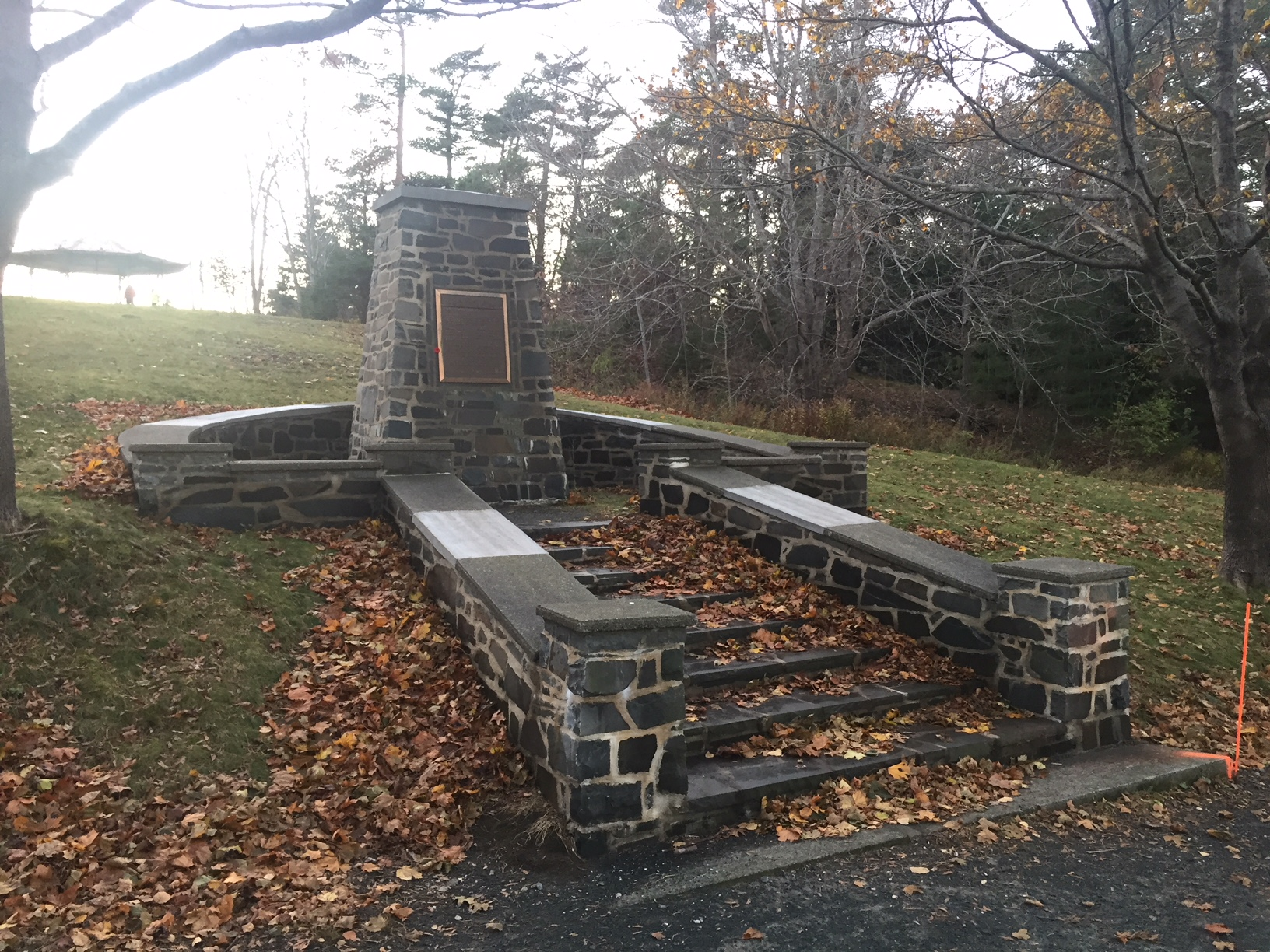
SS Point Pleasant Park Monument, Point Pleasant Park, Halifax, Nova Scotia, Canada. Unveiled in 1967 by surviving crew, the German Commander who torpedoed the vessel Alfred Eick had a wreath placed at the base of the monument during the ceremony

Twenty-two years after the sinking of the Point Pleasant Park, the survivors erected a memorial to their lost comrades in Halifax. The memorial was organized by Captain Paul Tooke, a Canadian Coast Guard captain who began his career aboard Point Pleasant Park rising from seaman to third officer on the ship. He worked with fellow survivor Philip Caddock to raise the moment in co-operation with the park commission. The monument was unveiled on 6 July 1967.

Research and publicity over the monument resulted in correspondence with the captain of U-510, Alfred Eick, who wrote to say that his sub had fired the torpedo. He also sent $30 ($180 in 2013) for a wreath that was placed at the base of the monument in a ceremony on 25 November 1967. Eick said he greatly regretted the loss of life for his action. Until the news of the monument had reached him, he had assumed that all the crew had survived, as his torpedo had struck far aft on the ship and he had observed the orderly evacuation of two full lifeboats before he left the scene fearing an air attack. He hoped the monument would help former enemies become friends and aid the cause of peace.

The nine dead are listed on the Halifax Memorial to the Merchant Marines in Point Pleasant Park: Joseph Bayliss (age 18), Alfred Malmberg (age 19), Leslie Toth (age 20), Louis Wilkinson (age 21), Patrick Guthrie (age 24), Frederick Breen (age 29), George Edwards (age 34), Ronald Hallahan (age 54), and Robert Munroe (age 39).

A large scale model of Point Pleasant Park forms a centerpiece of the "Battle of the Atlantic" exhibit at the Halifax Maritime Museum of the Atlantic.

== See also ==
Military history of Nova Scotia
