= RFA Fort Rosalie (A186) =

1945 Fort-class stores ship of the Royal Fleet Auxiliary

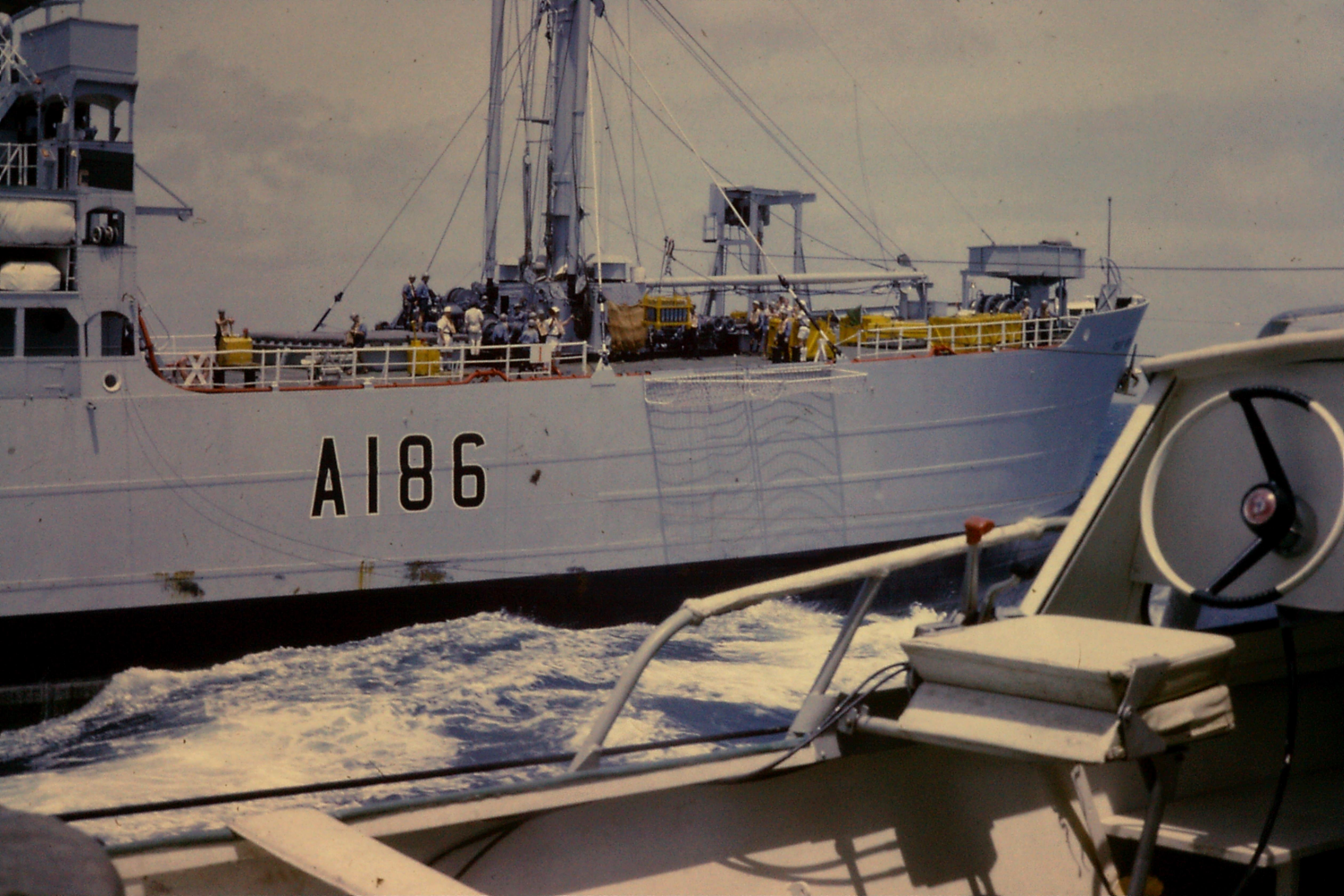

History

United Kingdom
- Name: RFA Fort Rosalie
- Builder: United Shipyards, Montreal
- Laid down: 29 August 1944
- Launched: 18 November 1944
- Commissioned: 7 April 1945; Transferred to the RFA on 20 November 1947
- Decommissioned: 1 May 1972
- Fate: Arrived at Castellon for scrapping on 10 February 1973

General characteristics
- Tonnage: 7332 grt, 3815 nrt, 7,620 tonnes deadweight (DWT)
- Length: 441 ft 6 in (134.57 m)
- Beam: 57 ft 2 in (17.42 m)
- Draught: 26 ft 11.5 in (8.217 m)
- Propulsion: 3 cyl triple expansion steam; 2500 ihp; One shaft.
- Speed: 11 knots (13 mph; 20 km/h)
- Range: 11,400 nmi (21,100 km) at 10 kn (12 mph; 19 km/h)
- Complement: 115
- Armament: During the Second World War: 1 × 4-inch (100 mm) gun; 8 × 20mm AA guns

RFA Fort Rosalie (A186) was an armament stores carrier of the Royal Fleet Auxiliary, one of the cargo ships known as Fort ships

She was built by United Shipyards, Montreal and initially completed as a stores ship but converted to an armament stores issuing ship at Portsmouth 1947/8. She served in the Pacific Fleet Train and remained in the Far East until 1951. She took part in Operation Grapple, the thermonuclear weapon test at Christmas Island in 1957. The ship was fitted with cargo lifts 1959/60. She was decommissioned on 1 May 1972 and laid up at Rosyth. She arrived at Castellon for scrapping on 10 February 1973.

During World War II, 28 were lost to enemy action, and four were lost due to accidents. Many of the surviving 166 ships passed to the United States Maritime Commission. The last recorded scrapping was in 1985.

Fort and Park ship were the Canadian equivalent of the American Liberty ships. All three shared a similar design by J.L. Thompson and Sons of Sunderland, England. Fort ships had a triple expansion steam engine and a single screw propeller. and two ships, the former Fort St. James and Fort St. Paul, were listed on Lloyd's Register until 1992.

== See also ==
- RFA Fort Langley (A230)
- RFA Fort Charlotte (A236)
- RFA Fort Duquesne (A229)
- Fort Cataraqui (ship)
