= Greenhill Park =

Greenhill Park may refer to:

- Greenhill Park at Greenhill, Edinburgh, Scotland
- SS Green Hill Park a ship that exploded in Vancouver, B.C. in 1945.
- Green Hill Park, Worcester, Massachusetts, United States
