= Seafarers' International Union of Canada =

Labour union

SIU Canada
- Seafarers' International Union of Canada // Syndicat International des Marins Canadiens
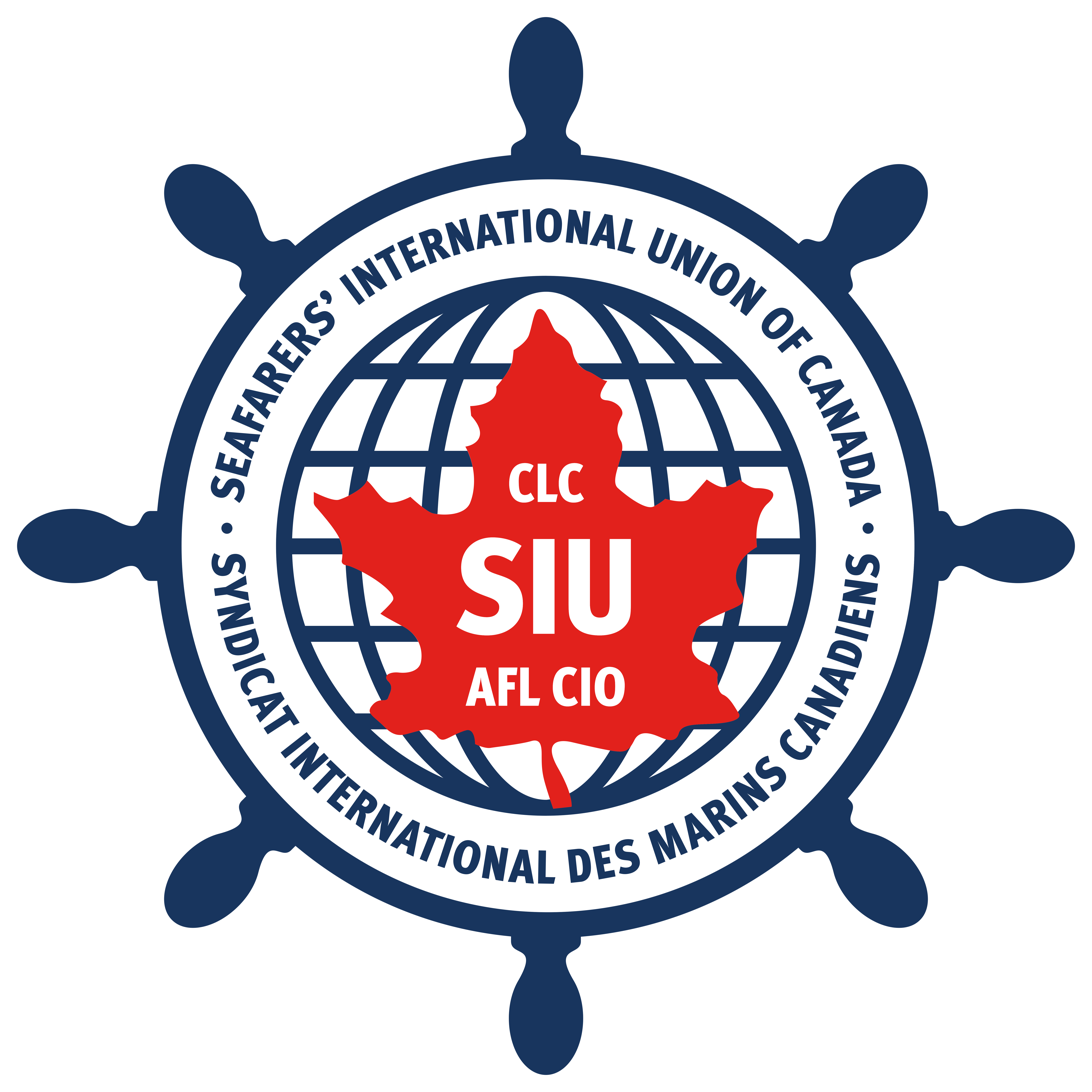
- Founded: 1938
- Headquarters: Montreal, QC
- Location: Canada
- President: Chris Given
- Executive Vice-President: Charles-Etienne Aubry
- Parent organization: Seafarers International Union
- Affiliations: Canadian Labour Congress // International Transport Workers' Federation
- Website: seafarers.ca

The Seafarers' International Union of Canada (SIU) is a Canadian labour union representing seafarers working aboard Canadian flag vessels. The Seafarers' International Union of Canada is affiliated with the Seafarers International Union of North America. The SIU was founded in 1938 and represents thousands of unlicensed seafarers working aboard vessels in Canadian waters, including the Great Lakes, St. Lawrence River, and East and West Coasts.

== Advocacy ==
In September 2015, the SIU filed 42 lawsuits alleging that the Government of Canada was issuing work permits to the foreign crews of hundreds of foreign ships engaging in shipping in Canadian waters, despite the availability of qualified Canadian seafarers to serve on these vessels, which is contravention of immigration laws. In July 2016, the SIU filed an additional 13 lawsuits with similar allegations, forcing the Government of Canada to admit that it improperly issued work permits to the foreign crew members of the New England, a Marshall Islands flagged oil tanker that engaged in shipping in Canada.

The Federal Court granted SIU's judicial review applications and set aside 11 work permits for the crew of the New England. The SIU was successful in reaching a settlement of the remaining outstanding 44 lawsuits with Employment and Social Development Canada.

In April 2017, then SIU Canada President, James Given, appeared as a witness to testify before the Standing Senate Committee on Foreign Affairs and International Trade on their study of CETA.

In September 2017, SIU President James Given appeared as a witness to testify before the House Standing Committee on Transportation, Infrastructure and Communities on their study of Bill C-49, the Transportation Modernization Act.

In September 2018, SIU President James Given appeared as a witness to testify before the House Standing Committee on Transportation, Infrastructure and Communities on their study of the Canadian Transportation and Logistics Strategy (Trade Corridors).

Early in 2017, President Given met with Mr. Steve Verheul from Global Affairs Canada, the former chief negotiator for CETA and Canada's chief negotiator for NAFTA. He also met trade officials as well as representatives from Transport Canada. In these productive meetings, President Given received assurance that changes under CETA will in no way allow EU shipowners to bypass the Temporary Foreign Workers Program, which would allow feeder services to operate between Montreal and Halifax. Foreign crew members onboard will have to obtain temporary foreign worker permits.

== Presidents ==
Hal C. Banks

Leonard J. McLaughlin

Roman Gralewicz (1973-2010)

Michel Desjardins (2010-2012)

James Given (2012-2023)

Michael Given (2023-2025)

Chris Given (2025-present)

== See also ==
- Hal C. Banks
- Canadian Merchant Navy
