= Hal C. Banks =

American labor leader (1909–1985)

Harold Chamberlain "Hal" Banks (February 28, 1909 – September 24, 1985) was an American trade union leader in Canada. An American from Waterloo, Iowa. Banks had served prison time in San Quentin Prison for burglary and had mob connections prior to arriving in Canada in 1949. He had little union experience, once "finding a temporary livelihood as a worker on the mudsills of the maritime industry, shipping on Standard Oil tankers out of Richmond, California.", Nonetheless, his mission was to help bust the purportedly Communist-controlled Canadian Seaman's Union and establish the Seafarers International Union.

Critics charged that Banks was welcomed into Canada "with the help of the Liberal St. Laurent government. Banks was, while he stayed in the country, aided by Canadian labour leaders in the Trades and Labour Congress, and shipping companies that opted for a corrupt SIU union over a militant CSU union. The confrontations between the two unions, the SIU, a yellow-dog union, and the allegedly Communist CSU, were vicious and violent events."

"The SIU won that battle and Banks received landed immigrant status and stayed in the country throughout the 1950s and early 1960s ... the 13 years that Hal C. Banks ruled his union and, to some extent, Montreal. The corruption, lack of democracy in the SIU, and beatings administered and ordered by Banks ... Complaints reached the newly formed Canadian Labour Congress (CLC) of Banks’ use of the arbitrary and heavy-handed Do Not Ship List (which barred thousands of career seamen from their only known livelihood for the purpose of raising funds through bribes and instilling compliance through fear)."

Though his union controlled the majority of ship borne workers and longshoremen in Canada "Banks’ downfall stemmed from his efforts to expand the jurisdiction of his union to include the licensed members of ship crews, the mates and the engineers, who had their own labour organizations." He launched another campaign of violence, and "ordered the brutal beating of Captain Walsh, a leader in the Canadian Merchant Service Guild" which provoked the Canadian Brotherhood of Railway Transport and General Workers (CBRT) into supporting the mates. Additionally, in 1960, the CLC suspended the Canadian SIU for its jurisdictional raiding activities. Increased violence led the CBRT to launch a wildcat strike that shut down the newly opened St. Lawrence Seaway, and this quickly got the federal government's attention, as commerce ground to a halt on the Great Lakes.

"In response, the government announced the creation of a special commission of inquiry, what became known as the Norris Commission. The public probe stretched over months of highly publicized hearings in late 1962 and early 1963. One-hundred and eighty-seven witnesses testified, including Banks and his union associates, as well as a range of other labour leaders and some employers. The commission issued its findings in July 1963. The 318-page report included a scathing denunciation of Banks and a call for the creation of government trusteeship over the SIU and the other Canadian maritime unions. Parliament followed this recommendation by passing the Trusteeship Act in October 1963. The law imposed a three-year government trusteeship over five maritime unions, which included about 15,000 members in total."

Banks remained in Canada until 1964, when he skipped bail ($25000) and returned to the United States rather than face criminal charges linked to a physical assault on a rival union leader. The Pearson government had taken control of his union and proceeded to press charges against him. The Canadian government filed an extradition request, which was refused by U.S. Secretary of State Dean Rusk.

At the time, a conspiracy was alleged that the Canadian government purposefully allowed Banks to escape and only charged him with offences that would not qualify him for extradition from the United States, but the Ontario government filed a perjury charge against him, which led to the extradition request which was later denied by Rusk (a request he said came from a Canadian federal government minister.) It almost caused the fall of the federal Liberal government. A news team found him living in a yacht in New York City. Banks eventually retired to San Francisco where he lived and worked on the waterfront ferrying harbour pilots in his small boat, eventually "slipping into old age and ornery obscurity, and passed away in 1985."

In 1985, Canadian documentary filmmaker Donald Brittain made an award-winning film about Banks, Canada's Sweetheart: The Saga of Hal C. Banks. Maury Chaykin played Banks in historical reenactments. A 1988 book by Canadian author Peter Edwards, Waterfront Warlord corrected several errors in the film, including the implication that Banks had his nemesis John Droeger killed.

== See also ==
- Canadian Merchant Navy
- Seafarers' International Union of Canada
- Seafarers International Union of North America
