= SS Jasper Park =

- SS Jasper Park 1943

History

Canada
- Name: Jasper Park
- Namesake: Jasper National Park
- Owner: Park Steamship Company
- Builder: Davie Shipbuilding
- Launched: 12 August 1942
- Completed: 24 September 1942
- Fate: Torpedoed and sunk on 6 July 1943

General characteristics
- Type: Park ship
- Tonnage: 2,878 GRT; 1,653 NRT
- Length: 315 ft 5 in (96.14 m)
- Beam: 46 ft 5 in (14.15 m)
- Depth: 22 ft 9 in (6.93 m)
- Installed power: Triple expansion steam engine
- Propulsion: Screw propeller
- Crew: 34, plus 4 DEMS gunners
- Armament: 1 x 4 inch deck gun aft; 1 x 3 inch (76 mm)/50 caliber gun; 4 x 20 mm Oerlikon; 2 x Twin .50 cal. Machine Guns; 20 x Rail Anti-Aircraft Rocket Launcher (Pillar Box)

SS Jasper Park was a Park ship freighter, built in 1942. She was sunk by torpedo from German submarine U-177 on 6 July 1943, the first Park ship lost to enemy action. She was completed on 24 September 1942, by the company Davie Shipbuilding in Lauzon, Quebec. Her hull number is 537. Davie Shipbuilding is now called Chantier Davie Canada Inc. The ship was owned by the Park Steamship Company, which was owned by Canada's Federal government. The government had built 400 vessels during World War II. Built as a merchant steamship constructed for Canada's Merchant Navy in 1942. She was named after Jasper National Park in the Canadian Rockies in the province of Alberta, Canada.

She was operated for the Government by Canada Shipping Company.

== World War II ==
Jasper Park was part of Convoy ON 154. The ships departed Liverpool on 18 December 1942 and were met by the Royal Canadian Navy Mid-Ocean Escort Force Group C-1. The convoy sailed in twelve columns of three or four ships each. The convoy formation was five miles (8.0 km) wide and one point five miles (2.4 km) long. Of the 55 cargo freighters 13 were sunk on the trip, Jasper Park survived. Jasper Park and remainder of the convoy reached New York City on 12 January 1943.

Jasper Park was on voyage from Calcutta and Cochin, India unescorted to Saint John, New Brunswick via Durban, South Africa with 6,500 tons of general cargo including jute and tea. On 6 July 1943 at 10AM Jasper Park was found by the German submarine U-177, commanded by Robert Gysae, south-southwest of Cap Sainte Marie, Madagascar. Jasper Park was hit by two or three torpedoes from U-177. She sank in the Indian Ocean, south of Durban.

The Germans questioned the Jasper Park survivors they found in two lifeboats, then departed. Jasper Park had a crew of 55. Four men were lost in the sinking. The lifeboats were found and the master, 44 crew members and six gunners were rescued by two destroyers of the Royal Australian Navy: HMAS Quiberon and HMAS Quickmatch. The crew were taken to Durban. The ship is located on the ocean floor at (32°52′S 42°15′E).

The lost are remembered in the Royal Canadian Naval Ships Memorial Monument in Spencer Smith Park in Burlington, Ontario.

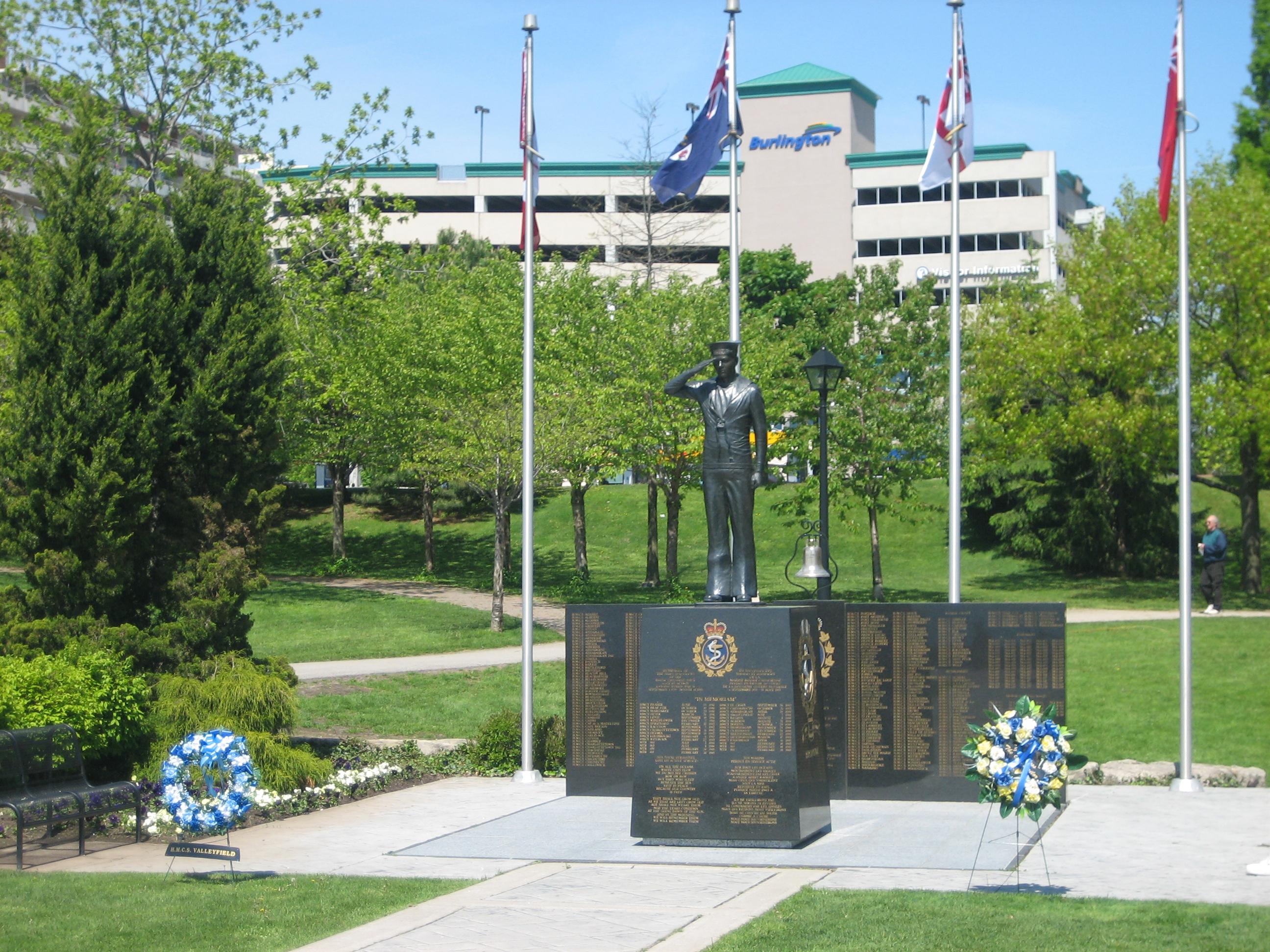
WWII Navy Memorial in Spencer Smith Park in Burlington, Ontario

== See also ==
- Allied technological cooperation during World War II
- Empire ships
- List of Liberty ships
