= Canadian Merchant Navy =

Fleet of merchant vessels that are registered to Canada

Canada, like several other Commonwealth nations, created the Canadian Merchant Navy (French: Marine marchande Canadienne) in a large-scale effort during World War II. A total of 12,000 men and women served in Canada's Merchant Navy. By war's end, 1,500 Canadians had died, including eight women.

184 ships are involved in merchant shipping activity in the Canadian shipping industry.

== History ==
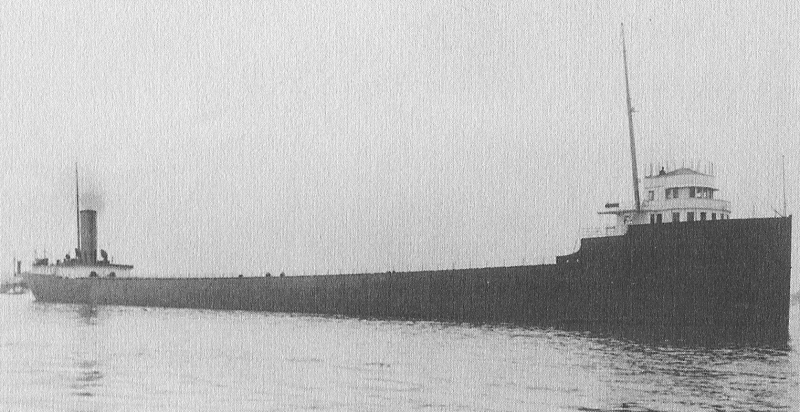
The 529-foot (161.2 m) Canadian laker James Carruthers on Lake Huron in 1913.

An informal merchant navy appeared in 1914 at the start of World War I and was renamed Canadian Government Merchant Marine (Marine marchande du gouvernement canadien) in 1918, but slowly disappeared by 1930.

Within hours of Canada's declaration of war on September 10, 1939, the Canadian government passed laws to create the Canadian Merchant Navy setting out rules and controls to provide a workforce for wartime shipping. The World War II Merchant Navy greatly expanded the similar World War I effort. The Canadian Merchant Navy played a major role in the Battle of the Atlantic bolstering the Allies' merchant fleet due to high losses in the British Merchant Navy. Eventually thousands of Canadians served aboard hundreds of Canadian Merchant Navy ships, notably the "Park ships", the Canadian equivalent of the American "Liberty ships". Royal Canadian Navy Rear Admiral Leonard W. Murray reported,

The Battle of the Atlantic was not won by any Navy or any Air Force, it was won by the courage, fortitude and determination of the British and Allied Merchant Navy.

A school was established at St. Margaret's Bay, Nova Scotia to train sailors for the Canadian Merchant Navy, who became known as "Merchant Mariners." Manning pools, or barracks, were built in major Canadian ports to house Merchant Mariners. The Merchant Navy was considered a fourth branch of the Canadian military alongside the Royal Canadian Navy, Canadian Army, and the Royal Canadian Air Force, and suffered the highest casualty rate of the four.

After the war, Canadian Merchant Navy veterans were denied veterans benefits and official recognition for decades. This was not corrected until the 1990s and many individual cases remain unresolved.

An important gesture in 2003 was the designation by the Canadian Parliament of the Merchant Navy Remembrance Day on September 3 as a day to recognize the contributions and sacrifice of Canadian Merchant Mariners.

The Merchant Navy slowly disappeared until by 1950 no Merchant Navy ships were left.

== Crew ==
Merchant Navy ships were armed during World War II. There were merchant seamen gunners. Also many British and Canadian merchantmen carried volunteer naval gunners called defensively equipped merchant ship or DEMS gunners. Merchant seamen crewed the merchant ships of the British Merchant Navy which kept the United Kingdom supplied with raw materials, arms, ammunition, fuel, food and all of the necessities of a nation at war throughout World War II. Seamen were aged from fourteen through to their late seventies.

== Memorials ==
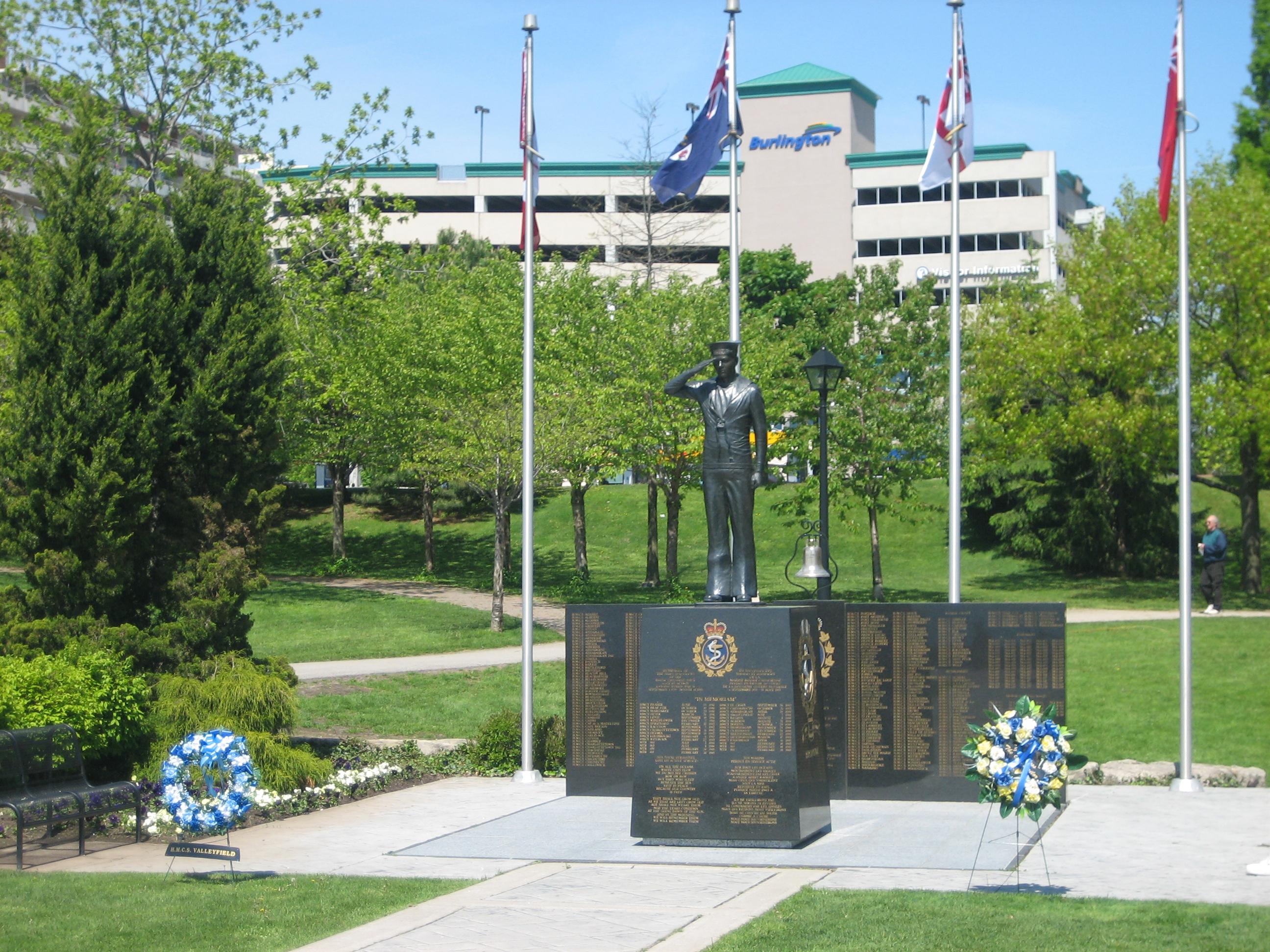
"Royal Canadian Naval Association Naval Memorial"(1995) by André Gauthier in Spencer Smith Park

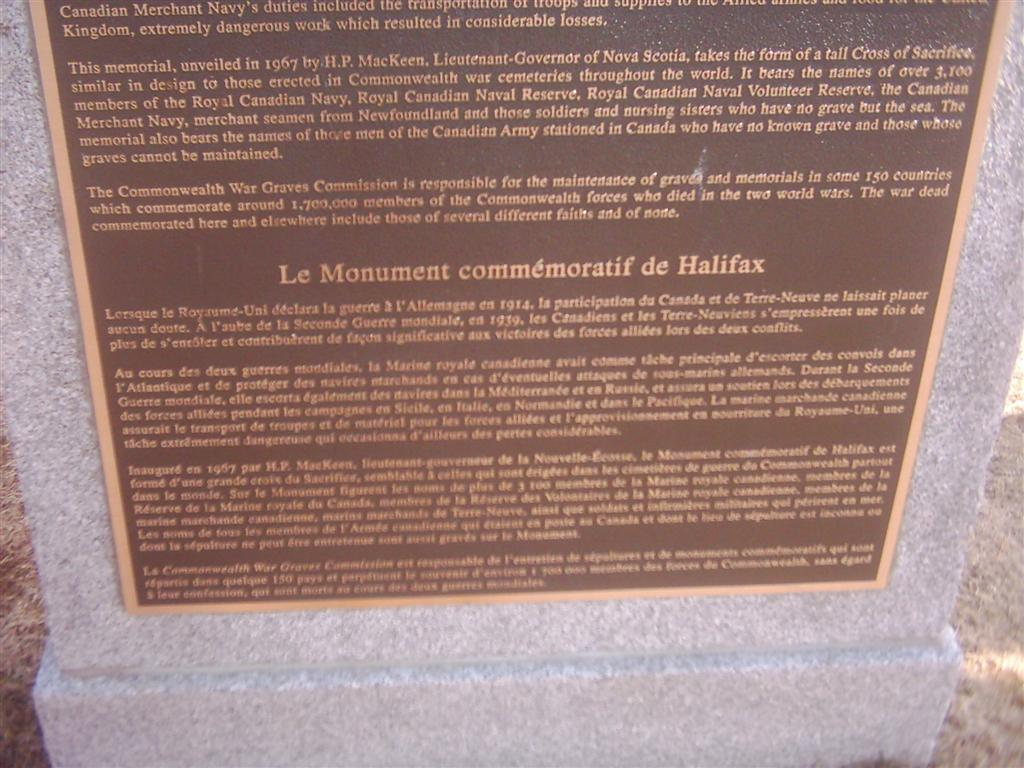
Plaque in Halifax, Nova Scotia commemorating the contribution of the merchant marine during the World Wars

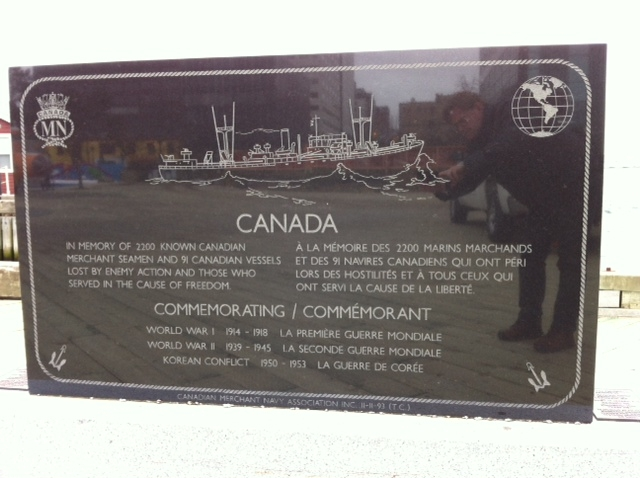
Engraving of SS Point Pleasant Park, Canadian Merchant Navy Monument, Sackville Landing, Halifax, Nova Scotia

- "Royal Canadian Naval Association Naval Memorial (1995)" by André Gauthier was erected on the shore of Lake Ontario in Spencer Smith Park in Burlington, Ontario. The 6 ft 4 in (1.9 m) high cast bronze statue depicts a World War II Canadian sailor in the position of attention saluting his lost shipmates. The model for the statue was a local Sea Cadet wearing Mike Vencel's naval service uniform. On the black granite base, the names of Royal Canadian Navy and Canadian Merchant Navy ships sunk during World War II are engraved.
- A commemorative plaque in SS Point Pleasant Park, Halifax, Nova Scotia unveiled in 1967, "When the United Kingdom declared war on Germany in 1914, Canada and Newfoundland's participation was virtually unquestioned. With the onset of the Second World War in 1939 Canadians and Newfoundlanders once more rushed to enlist and were a major factor in the Allied victories in both conflicts. During two world wars the main duty of the Royal Canadian Navy was to escort convoys in the Atlantic and guard merchant vessels against the threat of attack by German submarines. In the Second World War, it also escorted ships in the Mediterranean and to Russia and supported the Allied landings in Sicilian, Italian and Normandy campaigns as well as in the Pacific. The Canadian Merchant Navy's duties included the transportation of troops and supplies to the Allied armies and food for the United Kingdom, extremely dangerous work which resulted in considerable losses."
- At the Maritime Museum of the Atlantic in Halifax, Nova Scotia. "In memory of 2200 known Canadian Merchant Seamen and 91 Canadian vessels lost by enemy action and those who served in the cause of freedom – World War I 1914–1918; World War II 1939–1945; Korean Conflict 1950–1953"
- A monument in Windsor, Ontario, Canada "Dedicated to the men and women who served on the Royal Canadian Navy and the Canadian Merchant Navy. this includes those who served in World War I, World War II, and the Korean War. This monument sits along the Detroit River within the Windsor Sculpture Park in the Dieppe Gardens, named in memory of the soldiers who lost their lives in the 1942 landing at Dieppe.

Monuments to the Canadian Merchant Navy were erected in several Canadian cities:

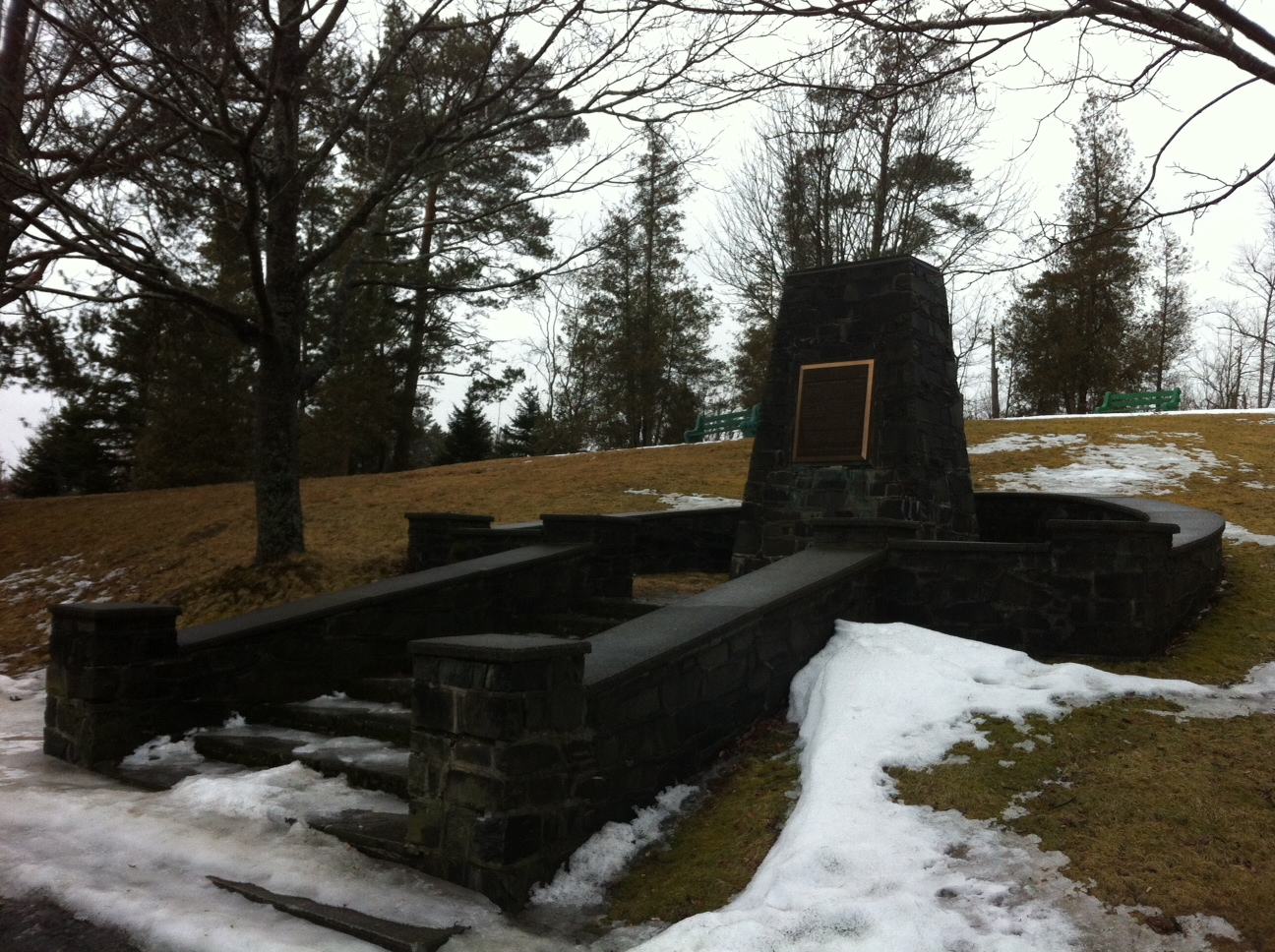
SS Point Pleasant Park Monument, Point Pleasant Park, Halifax, Nova Scotia, Canada

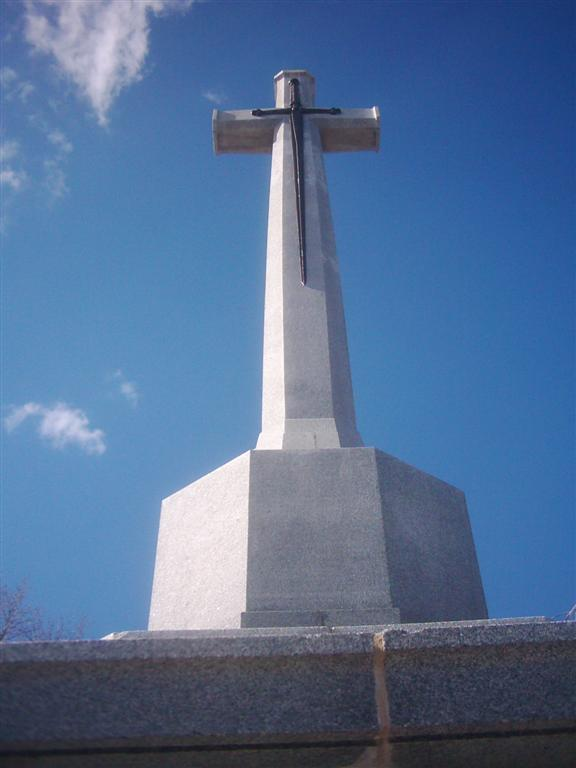
Halifax Memorial, Point Pleasant Park dedicated to the Canadian servicemen and women who died at sea during both World Wars and includes the Korean War

Second World War The Merchant Navy poster

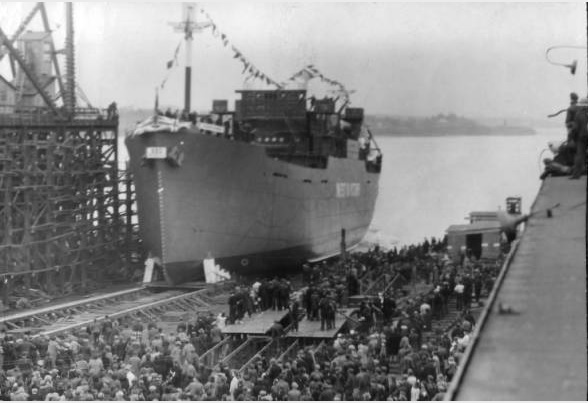
Launch of SS Ashby Park at the Pictou Shipyard in 1944

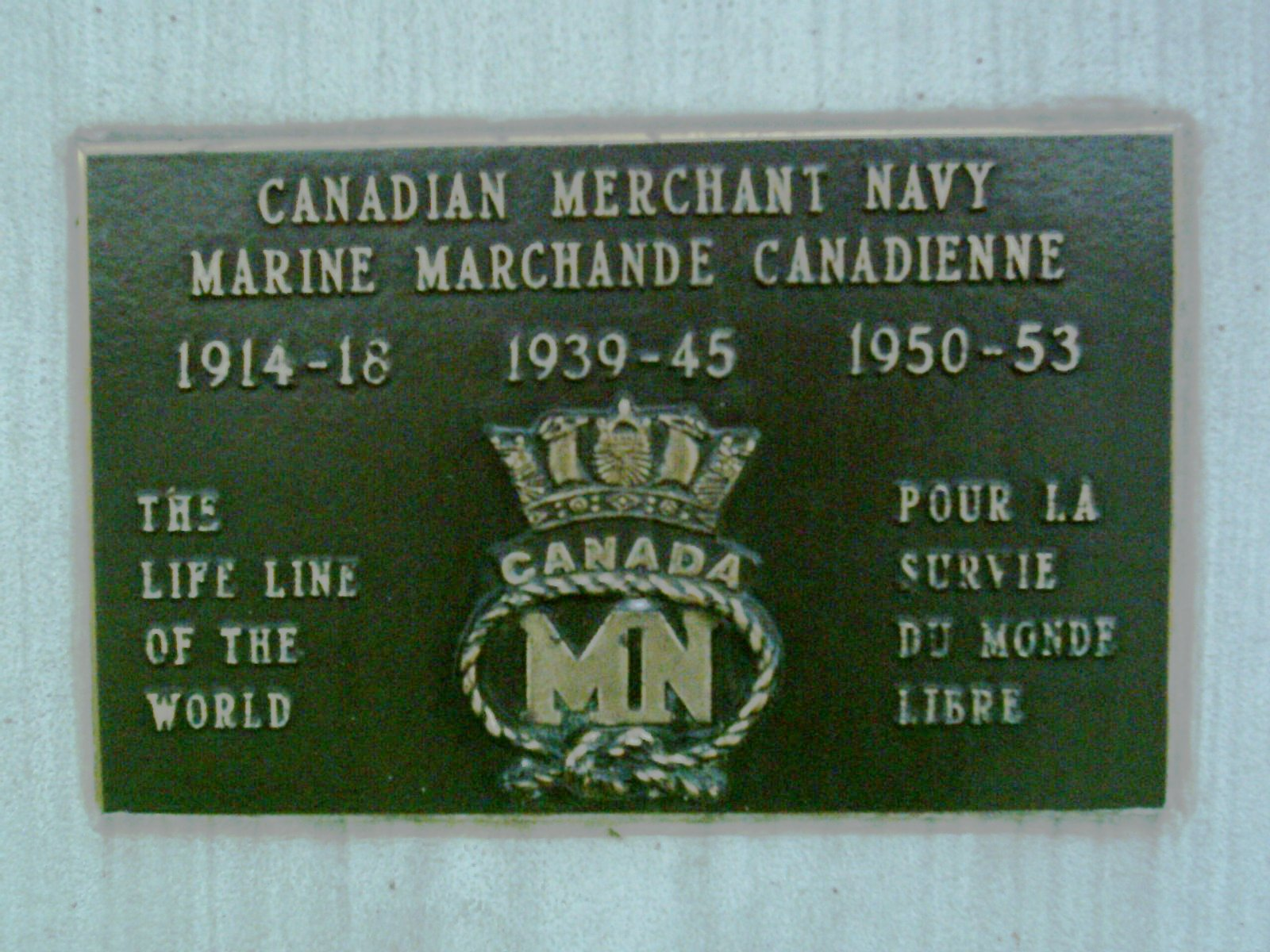
Plaque commemorating the Canadian Merchant Navy.

== Fleet ==
=== World War II ===
==== Canadian-registered ====
- Beacon Hill
- Elk Island Park
- Erik Boye (HX-48)
- Magog (HX-52)
- Waterloo
- Thorold
- Kenordoc (SC-3)
- St.Malo (HX-77)
- Trevisa (SC-7)
- Maplecourt (SC-20)
- Canadian Cruiser
- A.D. Huff
- J.B. White (HX-112)
- Canadolite
- Portadoc
- Europa
- Collingdoc
- Vancouver Island
- USS Proteus
- USS Nereus
- Shinai
- Lady Hawkins
- Montrolite
- Empress of Asia
- Victolite
- George L. Torian
- Lennox
- Sarniadoc
- Robert W. Pomeroy
- Vineland
- James E. Newsom
- Lady Drake
- Mildred Pauline
- Mont Louis
- Calgarolite
- Torondoc
- Troisdoc
- Frank B. Baird
- Liverpool Packet
- Mona Marie
- Lucille M.
- Prescodoc
- Princess Marguerite
- Donald Stewart
- Lord Strathcona
- John A. Holloway
- Oakton (Q533)
- Norfolk
- Carolus
- Bic Island (HX-212)
- Rose Castle
- Chr. J. Kampmann (TAG-18)
- Angelus
- Jasper Park
- Watuka
- Albert C. Field
- Cornwallis
- SS Point Pleasant Park
- Taber Park (FS-1753)
- Avondale Park
- Watkins F. Nisbet
- Mondoc
- R.J. Cullen
- Hamildoc
- Bic Island
- Europa
- Lady Nelson
- Cornwallis
- Nipawin Park (SH-194)
- Silver Star Park
- Green Hill Park
- Kootenay Park
- Salt Lake Park
- Westbank Park
- Donald Roach
- Kyle Lapierre
- Lake Chelan
- Elk Island
- Ironwood
- Hillcrest Park
- Lady Rodney
- Sunset Park
- S.S Glacier Park
- Rondeau Park
- Lakeside Park
- Mulgrave Park

== Statistics ==
=== World War II ===
- 10,000-ton dry cargo: 117
- 4,700-ton dry cargo: 32
- 10,000-ton tankers: 13
- 3,600-ton tankers: 6
- 2,000-ton tanker: 1
- 10,000-ton dry cargo Fort ships built for Britain: 97
- 10,000-ton stores issuing ships for Britain: 12
- Total ships built in Canada 1942 to 1945: 278

== See also ==
- Military history of Nova Scotia
- Hal C. Banks
- Seafarers' International Union of Canada
