= Pictou Shipyard =

Canadian shipyard

Coordinates: 45.678°N 62.700°W

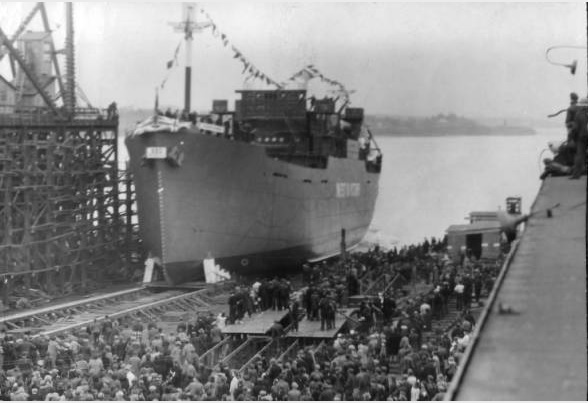
Launching of S.S. Ashby Park at the Pictou Shipyard in 1944

The Pictou Shipyard is a Canadian shipbuilding site located in Pictou County, Nova Scotia, and made famous by its use as an emergency shipbuilding facility in World War II, during which it constructed twenty-four 4,700-ton Scandinavian class freighters.

It was founded at its current location in 1856, as the Pictou Iron Foundry, by William Henry Davies. Through many business booms and busts, as well as several changes of ownership, it has continued to operate until today, when it is owned by Aecon Atlantic Industrial Inc.

== Early shipbuilding and repairs ==
Although the official founding by W. H. Davies did not occur until 1856, Pictou's ship registry began in 1840. Shipbuilding and ship repair began in Pictou in various places near the town a few years after settlement in 1773 via the Hector, with the first cargo of squared timber leaving Pictou in 1774. Other than the current site itself, the most significant site in the shipbuilding industry was located on Windmill Point where Captain William Lowden first settled in 1788. He eventually moved into the town of Pictou and continued his ship work. Captain Lowden is traditionally considered to be the father of shipbuilding in Pictou County, as he was made famous by his construction of the Harriet in 1798. At 600 tons she was built with room for twenty-four guns and was supposed to be the largest and finest ship built in the province at that time. He was not the first builder, however, as there is a record of a small one-mast vessel being launched in Pictou Harbour in 1788 by Thomas Copeland, and the county's first schooner named the Anne was built in 1788 at Merigomish, Nova Scotia. Shipbuilding and work continued throughout the early 1800s. Before the age of steam the types of ships built were schooners, brigs, and brigantines, barques and barquentines and full-rigged ships. Most notable was the yard's work on the SS Royal William on her fully steam-powered voyage across the Atlantic.

== A foundry in Pictou ==
W. H. Davies, who left the Albion Iron Foundry in 1854, completed and managed his own foundry on the Pictou waterfront in 1856. Davies's sons George and Charles carried on the foundry's operation until the late 1800s, when they sold it to Joseph Robb and Douglas Hannon. In 1906 Allan A. Ferguson bought out the interests of Robb, and the business was renamed as the Pictou Foundry and Machine Company. In 1910 Douglas Hannon died, and Ferguson became the sole owner and head of the business.

== Ferguson ownership ==
During Ferguson's twenty-five years of management of the foundry, it was diversified, with an expansion of machine, moulding, boiler, carpenter and pattern-work operations. This allowed for the lease of machine-shop facilities to early automobile mechanics. During 1913 the plant was equipped with electromotive power and was the first in the area to change from steam. After the outbreak of the Great War, the company participated in the war effort and machine finished thousands of shells forged in Trenton, Nova Scotia. Once the war was over and peace was enjoyed for another two decades, the primary work for the Pictou Foundry and Machine Company was both steel and wooden ship and dredge repairs.

Ferguson died in 1932, and the business was then taken over by his eldest son, Robert A. Ferguson, who upon the outbreak of war was joined by his three brothers, Allan A. Ferguson Junior, Thomas Ferguson and James Ferguson. Before World War II there had not been a ship launched in Pictou since the barque Orquell in 1879.

== Park ships ==
Britain had been at war for less than a year when it was realized that Germany was destroying Britain's merchant ships faster than they could be replaced. Due to Britain's focus on the production of its own naval ships, it did not have the capacity to keep up with merchant vessel losses. This led to a British shipbuilding commission arriving in North America in October 1940 looking for help to supply the much needed transport. The commission found the help they were looking for, and the Canadian government was charged with the immediate construction of twenty-six 10,000-ton cargo ships for Britain. At the same time Canada decided to build more ships for its own benefit. It was some of these additional ships that would be built as Park ships in Pictou. A totally of twenty-four 4,700-ton Scandinavian class freighters would eventually be built, but not before major preparation and expansion measures were completed to the yard and town to accommodate the new booming business.

When the good news hit Pictou on October 9, 1941, the Pictou shipyard consisted of a marine slip with refit and repair capability. Major changes thus had to be made, launch ways had to be built, and more space had to be created. To create more space, the landmark of Battery Hill was bulldozed to make room for the new yard. Along with the new developments, the new yard was taken over by Foundation Maritime Shipbuilding Limited. This allowed for the Ferguson brothers to retain the operations of the original marine slip and carry out repairs and refits to naval vessels. The first ship to be built was the SS Victoria Park, which was launched on October 22, 1942. Twenty-three more would follow.

The twenty-four Park ships built in Pictou were as follows:

- SS Victoria Park
- SS Camp Debert/Crescent Park
- SS Camp Aldershot/Rockcliffe Park
- SS Camp Petawawa/Montmorency Park
- SS Kensington Park
- SS Manitou Park
- SS Woodland Park
- SS Ainslie Park

- SS Hector Park/Camp Debert
- SS Chignecto Park
- SS Camp Petawawa/Beresford Park
- SS Camp Sussex/Avondale Park
- SS Confederation Park
- SS Cataraqui Park
- SS Galt Park/Kelowna Park
- SS Taber Park

- SS Parkdale Park/Liscomb Park
- SS Wentworth Park
- SS Sunset Park
- SS Ashby Park
- SS Evangeline Park
- SS Mulgrave Park
- SS Sutherland Park
- SS Lorne Park

== After World War II ==
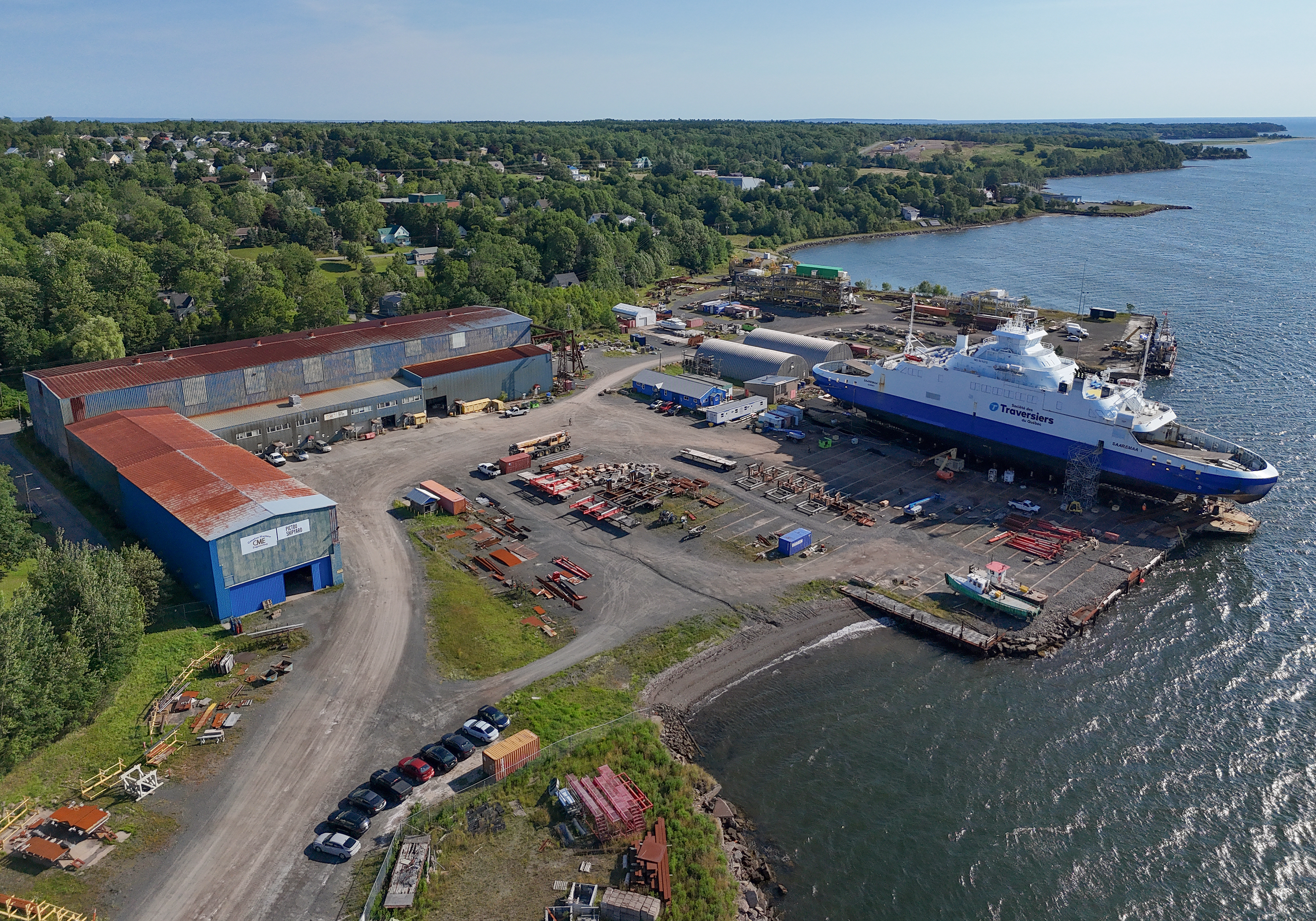
The shipyard in 2025

With the twenty-four Park ships built and the war over, Foundation Maritime Limited closed the shipyard and the equipment was sold. Convinced that shipbuilding could be a viable industry in Pictou, the Ferguson brothers, with the support of the Nova Scotia government, took over the shipyard building and re-equipped the yard. Although the senior brother, Robert A. Ferguson, died in 1942, the remaining brothers continued the firm, incorporated it as Ferguson Industries Ltd. and gained official ownership of the entire yard. The Fergusons built 107 steel ships in the post–World War II years, which included barges, trawlers, and ferry boats. The Fergusons' ownership lasted until 1984, when the firm faced bankruptcy and entered receivership.
