= Fort ship =

Class of cargo ships built in Canada during World War II

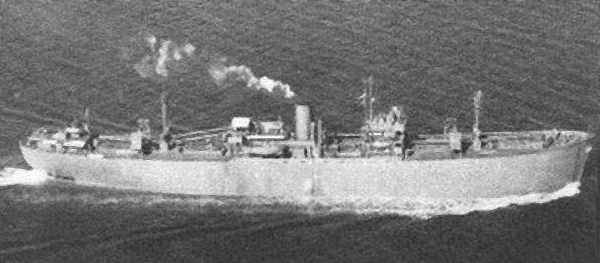
- Fort Stikine

Class overview
- Builders: Burrard Dry Dock; Canadian Vickers; Davie Shipbuilding; Marine Industries; North Vancouver Ship Repairs; Prince Rupert Drydock & Shipyard; United Shipyards; Victoria Machinery Depot; West Coast Shipbuilders; Yarrow Shipbuilders
- Operators: (United Kingdom) Ministry of War Transport; (Canada) Park Steamship Company; United States Maritime Commission
- Subclasses: Canadian type; North Sands type; Victory type
- Cost: $1,856,500
- Built: 1941-45
- In service: 1941-91
- Completed: 348
- Lost: 35

General characteristics
- Type: Cargo ship
- Tonnage: 7,167 GRT; 10,300 DWT
- Length: 424 feet 6 inches (129.39 m)
- Beam: 57 feet 2 inches (17.42 m)
- Depth: 34 feet 9 inches (10.59 m)
- Installed power: "North Sands", "Canadian" 3 x Scotch marine boilers "Victory" 2 x water-tube boilers
- Propulsion: 1 x 2,500 hp (1,864 kW) triple-expansion steam engine
- Speed: 10.5 knots (19.4 km/h)

During the Second World War, Canada produced a family of 10,000 tons deadweight (DWT) cargo ships. The names of ships operated by the United Kingdom (UK) were prefixed with "Fort", while ships operated by Canada were postfixed with "Park". At least 35 were lost during the war. At least one remained on shipping registers until 1991.

== Description ==
The "North Sands" type an emergency war design and was a typical British steamer design. It was 424 feet 6 inches (129.39 m) long with 7,167 GRT and 10,300 DWT. The ship was subdivided into three forward cargo holds, an engine room, and two rear cargo holds. Three coal-fired Scotch marine boilers powered a 2,500 hp (1,864 kW) triple-expansion steam engine; the engine was designed by the North-Eastern Marine Engineering Company at Wallsend. The powerplant and engines were older technology that could be produced in Canada. Four Canadian manufacturers - predominantly Dominion Engineering Works - made engines. Six Canadian manufacturers - mostly from the West Coast - made Scotch boilers. Some of these were imported from the United States (US). The related US-built Ocean ships and the later Liberty ships used the same engine, which allowed parts to be interchanged between North American shipyards and manufacturers.

The "Victory" type was a variant of the "North Sands" that replaced the Scotch boilers with two fuel oil-fired water-tube boilers; this was similar to the Liberty ship. The switch to oil reduced fuel consumption and the number of firemen. The midship superstructure was extended forward to just in front of the funnel; the small lifeboats from the forward bridge superstructure were moved to the extended midship boatdeck. this was similar to the Liberty ship. The extension may have been made possible by the removal of coal-loading hatches. The "Victory" tanker variant placed tanks, piping and pumps in the cargo holds; they did not look like typical tankers. In Canada, water-tube boilers for 10,000 DWT cargo ships were produced by Vancouver Iron Works.

The "Canadian" type reverted to Scotch boilers and could use coal or oil as fuel. According to James Pritchard, based on a requirements document, the "Canadians" reverted to the superstructure of the "North Sands". According to John Henshaw, the "Canadian" was a "Victory" that extended the midship boat deck forward to the bridge superstructure and increased the number of lifeboats from four to six.

Auxiliary ship variants of the "Victory" were developed for the stores and maintenance roles. They differed from the cargo ship in number of decks, internal configuration, auxiliary machinery and accommodations.

== History ==
On 2 September 1940, Robert Cyril Thompson of shipbuilder J. L. Thompson and Sons was appointed head of the British Merchant Shipbuilding Mission. The British Admiralty had been impressed by some of the ships constructed at the company's North Sands shipyard at Sunderland, possibly the pre-war 5,281 GRT Dorington Court or the approximately 7,450 GRT Empire Wind laid down around September 1939. The mission was to immediately order thirty 10,000 DWT cargo ships from North American shipyards to offset shipping losses from the ongoing Battle of the Atlantic and ultimately secure a supply of 60 such ships per year. The mission arrived in New York City on 3 October. The design for the triple-expansion reciprocating engine arrived from Britain around the same time. The mission toured the US and Canada for three weeks searching for suitable shipyards or locations for new shipyards. Thompson carried plans for some of the company's recent ships, likely including those for the 7,157 GRT Empire Liberty, which may have been laid down in September 1940. The designs used riveted construction, and a triple-expansion reciprocating engine powered by coal-fired Scotch boilers. The Empire Liberty plans were modified by Thompson to meet changing British requirements. US naval architecture firm Gibbs & Cox drafted expanded plans to meet US standards and to account for the US use of welding. In early 1941, the shelter deck was enclosed which increased increased deadweight tonnage from 9300 to 10300 tons. Contracts with US yards were signed on 20 December 1940, with those ships becoming the Ocean ships.

The design built in Canada, the "North Sands" type, was based on the 10300 DWT revision from early 1941. It may have been a variant of the Ocean. The main difference was the reversion to riveting. Contracts for ships from Canada were signed on 20 December 1940 and the first orders were issued in early-January 1941. Canadian Vickers, Davie Shipbuilding and Burrard Dry Dock each received six ships; Burrand later received two more. On 1 December 1941, Fort Ville Marie built by Canadian Vickers became the first "North Sands" type to be delivered. The second ship delivered was also the first from the Canadian West Coast; it was Fort St. James built by Burrard Dry Dock and completed on 29 January 1942. 200 "North Sands" were built from 1941 to 1944.

The "Victory" type was a "North Sands" powered by fuel oil-burning water-tube boilers. It was developed in the expectation that the US would continue to buy Canadian-built cargo ships after 1942 and a reliable oil supply from the US and the West Indies. Tanker losses in 1942 and fuel oil availability concerns led to some "Victories" being completed as tankers and the development of the "Canadian" type. The "Canadian" used coal or oil for fuel. 81 "Victories", plus 12 tankers, were built from 1943 to 1944. 28 "Canadians" were built from 1944 to 1945.

Auxiliary ships based on the "Victory" were built for the British Pacific Fleet. 17 were built from 1944 to 1945.

The costs for the first "North Sands" ordered from established Canadian shipyards were CA$1,860,000 for the West Coast and CA$1,785,000 for the St. Lawrence River In December 1942, to reduce war expenditures, contracts were renegotiated from fixed to cost-plus prices. The new prices were CA$1,775,000 and CA$1,700,000, respectively, and was possible because of improved productivity. Yards were expected to fund their own expansion; this was partially compensated with some ships being bought at the higher initial price. By October 1943, some yards estimated they could build the "North Sands" for less than CA$1,450,000. The number of man-hours per deadweight tonne to build a 10000 ton cargo ship fell from 560 for the first "North Sands" to 77 by the end of 1942. Welding supplanted riveting over time, although not to the same extent as in the US. 10,000 ton cargo ships built in Canadian yards cost 37-45% more to build, and 35% more to operate, than comparable ships built in Britain.

Ten Canadian shipbuilders produced 348 ships of the "North Sands" family. 252 were built in West Coast yards, including most of the "Victories".

The Park Steamship Company, a Canadian Crown corporation, was created on 8 April 1942, to own and manage the ships of the Canadian wartime merchant navy. During the war it took over 127 ships as Park ships. After the war, the 10,000 DWT ships were sold off at 25% to 33% of their cost. The ships were technically uncompetitive with even pre-war commercial designs but were attractive to domestic and international customers in the immediate post-war recovery period.

Britain received 104 ships from Canada through Mutual Aid; six were lost to enemy action and the remainder returned to Canada after the war. The US bought 90 ships from Canada which were then provided to Britain through Lend-Lease; 29 were lost with the remainder returned to the United States Maritime Commission after the war for disposal. British ships were typically named after forts, but some transfers from Canada retained "park" names.

Fort St. James was registered to a Chinese owner until 1991.

== Notable ships ==
Fort Cataraqui
Lead ship of the first Allied convoy into Antwerp following the 1944 Battle of the Scheldt.

Fort Romaine
Built by United Shipyards in Montreal and delivered on 6 September 1943. Set a Canadian wartime record for ship construction speed by being delivered 53 days after being laid down. The yard used made greater use of subassemblies than other Canadian yards.

Fort Stikine
Caused the 1944 Bombay explosion when an onboard fire detonated its cargo of 1,400 tons of explosives.

== See also ==
- Empire ship
- Victory ship

== Sources ==
- Giesler, Patricia (2005). Valour at Sea - Canada's Merchant Navy (PDF). Veteran Affairs Canada. ISBN 0-662-26765-6.
- Halford, Robert G. (1995). The Unknown Navy: Canada's World War Two Merchant Navy. St Catharines, Oatario: Vanwell Publishing. ISBN 1-55125-016-0.
- Henshaw, John (2019). Liberty's Provenance: The Evolution of the Liberty Ship from its Sunderland Origins. Barnsley, United Kingdom: Seaforth Publishing. ISBN 978-1-5267-5064-8.
- Pritchard, James (2011). A Bridge of Ships: Canadian Shipbuilding During the Second World War. Montreal & Kingston: McGill-Queen's University Press. ISBN 978-0-7735-3824-5.
