= RFA Fort Langley =

1945 Fort-class stores ship of the Royal Fleet Auxiliary

History

United Kingdom
- Name: RFA Fort Langley
- Builder: Victoria MD, Victoria
- Launched: 31 October 1944, as Montebello Park
- Completed: 18 May 1945, as Fort Langley
- Decommissioned: February 1970
- Stricken: 1970
- Fate: Sold for scrapping, 1970

General characteristics
- Tonnage: 7,263 GRT; 4,018 NRT; 7,543 t DWT
- Length: 441 ft 6 in (134.57 m)
- Beam: 57 ft 2 in (17.42 m)
- Draught: 27 ft (8.2 m)
- Propulsion: 1 × 3-cylinder triple expansion steam engine, 2,500 ihp (1,864 kW); 1 shaft
- Speed: 11 knots (20 km/h; 13 mph)
- Range: 11,400 nmi (21,100 km) at 10 kn (19 km/h; 12 mph)
- Complement: 115
- Armament: World War II : 1 × 4 in (100 mm) gun; 8 × 20 mm AA guns

RFA Fort Langley (A230) was a stores ship of the Royal Fleet Auxiliary.

The ship was launched on 31 October 1944 as Montebello Park by Victoria MD in Victoria, British Columbia, Canada. She was completed on 18 May 1945 as Fort Langley for the Ministry of War Transport as an Air stores issuing ship under the management of Alfred Holt and Company. Transferred to the RFA in May 1954, she was decommissioned in February 1970, and laid up at Devonport. Fort Langley arrived at Bilbao for scrapping on 21 July 1970.

Fort and Park ship were the Canadian equivalent of the American Liberty ships. All three shared a similar design by J.L. Thompson and Sons of Sunderland, England. Fort ships had a triple expansion steam engine and a single screw propeller.
