= HMCS Border Cities =

History

Canada
- Name: Border Cities
- Namesake: Windsor, Ontario
- Ordered: 12 December 1941
- Builder: Port Arthur Shipbuilding Co. Ltd., Port Arthur
- Laid down: 26 August 1942
- Launched: 3 May 1943
- Commissioned: 18 May 1944
- Decommissioned: 15 January 1946
- Identification: Pennant number: J 344
- Honours and awards: Atlantic 1944–45, English Channel 1944-45
- Fate: Sold for scrapping 1948

General characteristics
- Class & type: Algerine-class minesweeper
- Displacement: 990 tons
- Length: 68.6 m (225 ft)
- Beam: 10.8 m (35 ft 5 in)
- Draught: 2.6 m (8 ft 6 in)
- Propulsion: 2 × 3-drum Yarrow style water tube all welded boilers; 2 × 1250 HP triple expansion engines.
- Speed: 16 knots (30 km/h; 18 mph)
- Complement: 107
- Armament: 1 × QF 4 in (102 mm) Mk V anti-aircraft gun; 4 × 20 mm twin guns; 1 × Hedgehog ASW mortar; Depth charges

HMCS Border Cities was an Algerine-class minesweeper that served in the Royal Canadian Navy during the Second World War. The ship served as a convoy escort in the Battle of the Atlantic. After the war she was discarded and broken up. The ship was named for Windsor, Ontario but due to conflicts with other ships with that name, the actual name of the ship was chosen to commemorate the city, instead of naming it directly.

Border Cities was ordered 12 December 1941. The vessel was laid down on 26 August 1942 by Port Arthur Shipbuilding Company Ltd. at Port Arthur, Ontario and launched 3 May 1943. The ship was commissioned into the Royal Canadian Navy on 18 May 1944 at Port Arthur.

== Background ==
The class to which she belonged had been designed to overcome certain weaknesses which had been revealed in actual operation in the earlier Bangor-class minesweeper. The relatively limited steaming radius of the Bangor class lessened its usefulness as the war progressed. With the laying of mines in ever-deeper waters, swept areas had to be extended and, for this, a ship with greater endurance was desirable. This class of ship, too, lacked the space to conveniently accommodate the new types of equipment which were being added. It was for these reasons that, in 1941, the Admiralty began to develop a ship which eventually supplanted the earlier minesweepers in the construction programmes and was known as the Algerine minesweeper first and, later, coastal escort.

Like the Bangor class, the Algerine was prepared to function either as an anti-submarine escort or a minesweeper. However, when it became apparent that the submarine posed a greater danger than the mine in the areas for which the Royal Canadian Navy was responsible, a greater emphasis came to be laid on the former.

Again, compared to the Bangors, the Algerines were a longer ship by 45 feet and had over 1,500 miles greater endurance at 12 knots. It could therefore carry more men and equipment and had a longer range.

In October 1941, the Naval Service decreed that from thenceforth the Algerine class should be ordered for construction. Approval was given at the same time for the building of thirty frigates and ten of the Algerine class. Among the latter was Border Cities. The entire Canadian contingent of the Algerine class was to be built by the Port Arthur Shipbuilding Co of Port Arthur, Ontario.

== Service history ==
=== Commissioning ===
On 24 March 1943, the shipbuilding firm stated that the ship, CN-366, was ready for launching but that it would be necessary, because of ice conditions, to postpone it until at least 15 or 20 April. It was desirable that certain guests should be invited for the accompanying ceremony, particularly dignitaries from the sponsoring city of Windsor. Unfortunately, this was not done, as the launching of a ship had been required as a part of a Victory Loan ceremony held on 3 May 1943 and the shipyard picked Border Cities for the performance.

The ship had been named for Windsor, Ontario, or, more strictly, for the adjoining "Border Cities" of East Windsor, Walkerville, Windsor and Sandwich, which had been amalgamated into one city, Windsor, by the Amalgamation Act of 1935.

Since the name Windsor was already borne by a British destroyer, the Board of Trade of the city had suggested the use of Border Cities and the name had been submitted by Mayor Reaume. The city's Rotary Club stated that if the suggestion were accepted, the club would be prepared to adopt the ship and provide comforts to the ship's company by way of extra equipment not supplied by the Naval Service, to the extent of $500 initial expenditure and $250 annually for the duration of the war.

Once the name had been accepted, citizens of Windsor pointed out that it would be a happy event if the ship could be commissioned in their city. The distillery firm of Hiram Walker and Sons, Ltd. had docking facilities in Walkerville and arrangements could be made with them if the department agreed to use them for the ceremony. Attached to the docks were lawns which were quite spacious and lovely, with a balcony which would lend itself nicely for the occasion.

As a precedent, it was maintained that the Bangor-class minesweeper, HMCS Westmount, which had been built by the Dufferin Shipbuilding Co of Toronto, had been commissioned at Westmount, Quebec. It was pointed out to these enthusiastic citizens, however, that Westmount had been commissioned in Toronto and had later paid a visit to Westmount. It was further pointed out that she could not have been sailed by the navy if she had not been commissioned first. For the same reason, Border Cities would have to be commissioned in Port Arthur. Presumably, though, the ship could visit Windsor for a similar dedication ceremony while passing through the lakes.

So the ship was commissioned on 18 May 1944 at Port Arthur. Before this date she had carried out full power, endurance, steering, anchor and going astern trials.

All these had proved to be satisfactory.

=== Battle of the Atlantic – 1944 ===
Two days following the commissioning, the ship left Port Arthur, steaming through Lakes Superior and Huron to Sarnia, where she arrived on the 22nd. Held up by fog, she did not leave this port until 0600, the 23rd. She then went on to Windsor where she found all preparations made to receive her. At the Hiram Walker dock in Walkerville, a presentation of gifts was made to her. These gifts had been stored in a warehouse on the dock and among them were such articles as a washing machine, electric irons, radios, phonographs, musical instruments, ash trays, games, toilet articles, kitchen utensils, writing materials and magazines. That she might be seen and inspected by the citizenry, the ship, following the presentation, proceeded to the Government Dock in Windsor. In the evening, officers and men were feted at the Prince Edward Hotel. The following day, the ship was open to the public and she departed in the early evening.

Steaming on her way, she passed through Lake Erie into Lake Ontario to Toronto, which she reached on the 20th. Off the Queen City she carried out gun and depth charge trials. They were satisfactory although one of her depth charges failed to explode. The failure was promptly reported to authorities.

When she left Toronto on the 30th, trials were carried out with the hedgehog, the bomb-throwing mortar which was used as an extra anti-submarine battery along with the depth charge throwers.

Montreal was raised on 1 June 1944 and the ship remained in the port until the 6th when she went to Quebec City to embark ammunition and carry out further trials. From Quebec on the 14th, she proceeded down river to the Gulf. The Straits of Canso between Cape Breton and the mainland of Nova Scotia were negotiated, the town of Mulgrave being passed on the 16th. The day following this, the ship reached Halifax, her operational base, where she prepared herself to take her part in the great international struggle to maintain the country's freedom. The day following arrival, she commenced a refit. One of the chief undertakings included in it was the fitting in her of H/F D/F equipment. (Note: The H/F D/F or High-Frequency Direction-Finding equipment. It was pronounced "Huff-Duff" and could pick up from land or ship the radio transmissions of U-boats at sea. "Radar furnished the convoys with a cat's eye, sonar with its ears, while the high-frequency direction finders…acted as a highly sensitive and elongated cat's whiskers.") A generator, being defective, also required attention.

Border Cities passed the month of July 1944 in Bermudan waters, engaged in working-up exercises. She left Halifax on the 8th and did not return until 3 August. Two days before her return, she had been allocated to the Western Escort Force for duty with the escort group, W-2. (Note: There were 7 "W" groups in October 1944. In December of the same year, the number was increased to 8 and, on 27 April 1945, to 9. (NHS 8440-130).)

The Western Escort Force was based in Halifax and was employed in escorting eastbound convoys as far as WESTOMP, the western ocean meeting-point. This was on or about Longitude 52° West, thus east of Cape Race, Newfoundland. Here, the escorts of the Force were relieved by ships of the Mid-Ocean Escort Force. Turning around, they picked up a westbound convoy and returned with it to Halifax or New York.

On 12 August 1944, Border Cities steamed to St. Margaret's Bay, near Halifax, to be taken in hand for H/F D/F calibration. On the 19th, she left Halifax and, after some exercising with other ships, proceeded to New York where she, in company with her group, picked up her first convoy, HXF-305. (Note: An HX convoy ran from New York to the United Kingdom. Earlier, its starting point had been Halifax, which accounts for the "H" in its designation. The "F" qualifies it as a fast, while an "S" indicates that it was a slow convoy. An extra "H" before the designation refers to the Halifax section of the main HX convoy.) It was accompanied to HOMP, a position fixed according to the individual convoy, where Western Escort groups from the south were relieved by others from the north or vice versa. On this occasion, W-2 was relieved by W-3 and then returned to Halifax.

HXF-305 was later turned over to the mid-ocean group, C-5, HMCS Dunver. On 8 September, it was attacked by U-boats, which sank, with heavy loss of life, a large British tanker, SS Empire Heritage, and, a half hour later, a rescue ship, HMS Pinto, who had been engaged in picking up survivors.

Border Cities had joined W-2 as Senior Officer of the group. When, on 2 September 1944, she left Halifax with Convoy HHXS-306, she had as fellow members, the corvettes, HMCS Orillia, HMCS Midland, and HMCS Arvida. The mid-ocean escort C-1, sailed out from St. John's and emerged on the 12th, to meet ONS 251. (Note: The ON convoys reversed the direction taken by the HX convoys, making the passage from the British Isles to North America. As with the HX convoys, the added "F" and "S" refer to fast and slow convoys.) Orillia detached with ships for Halifax and the rest went on to New York.

One of Orillia's charges was a rescue ship laden with survivors. The convoy had been shepherded across the ocean by Escort Group, C-4. Soon after nightfall on the 2nd, about 90 miles north-west of Londonderry, what appeared to be a lone U-boat sank the Norwegian steamship Fjordheim. Thirty-five of the crew of thirty-eight were picked up, thirty-three by HMCS Montreal and the other two by a merchant ship, Empire Mallory. They were later transferred to a rescue ship, SS Fastnet, and so taken to Halifax.

After leaving ONS 251 at New York, W-2 turned around and went northward with HXF 310. Relieved by W-3, the ships entered Halifax on the 25th. Another convoy escorted during September 1944 was HHX 311. Convoys ON 256, HX 315 and HHX 316 received the close support of the Group during October.

Border Cities and her group escorted ON 261 and HX 320 during the first part of November 1944. From the 22nd to 26th, the ship was in Shelburne, Nova Scotia, having defects attended to. Sailing independently, she rejoined the others, assuming as before the duties of Senior Officer. They were escorting ONS 36 at the time.

The accompanying of XB 136 (Note: XB convoys ran from Halifax to Boston and BX convoys in the reverse direction. Bay of Fundy ports might be included in these runs.) took the ship, with Orillia and Midland, to Boston in December. They came away from the port with convoy BX 136. Other convoys escorted during the month were HHX 320 and ON 272. The latter was badly scattered on the 28th and 29th, when it was necessary to heave to in heavy weather.

One ship, Jamaica Planter, was lost from HX 320 but this was by collision. W-2 formed the convoy's Local Northern Escort. There were also a Local Southern, a Support Group and a Mid-Ocean escort.

On the 17th, HMCS Charlottetown, a member of the support group (Note: While the duty of the close escort was to remain with the convoy in a defensive role, the ships of the support groups gave added defence only, and were free to range far and wide in offensive action against U-boats in the vicinity.) for HX 320, picked up an H/F D/F bearing on an enemy submarine. Border Cities did likewise the following day, as well as HMCS Stettler and HMCS Antigonish of the support group. It was estimated that the transmissions originated with a U-boat some thirty miles away. A few days later-the 26th and 30th- when with ON 272, Border Cities reported more recordings of U-boat transmissions, and again on 6 January 1945, when with HX 330.

=== Battle of the Atlantic – 1945 ===
W-2 joined HX 330 on 3 January 1945 at New York after leaving ON 272 in that port. With Border Cities were Orillia, Midland, HMCS Timmins, and HMCS Napanee. On the 4th, hedgehog and depth charge attacks made by Midland on a contact, brought up oil which took fire. Border Cities, the Senior Officer's Ship, considered that the contact had been bounced off a wreck, although she admitted that the existence of one in the position was not confirmed by chart. Midland remained with her contact until daylight the next morning.

On the 14th, Border Cities joined other ships to search for a killer U-boat in the Halifax approaches. The 20-ship convoy BX 141, while under escort of Westmount and HMCS Nipigon, and support group, EG-27 – was attacked just off Chebucto Head while the convoy was entering harbour in single line ahead. The tanker, British Freedom, was hit on the port side of the engine room. She began to settle at once and had to be abandoned. A US liberty ship, SS Martin Van Buren, was then torpedoed aft, and a British tanker, Athelviking, received a similar wound. Both tankers eventually sank, while the liberty ship drifted ashore in the vicinity of Ketch Harbour. HMCS Ettrick and HMCS Meon carried out attacks on contacts without visible results.

A search was instituted, with aircraft assisting the ships. From Halifax, Border Cities steamed out with instructions to take several ships under her orders. The search was an unsuccessful one. It continued until the 23rd, but Border Cities was engaged with it only for the day. She then went to join her group to escort from Halifax Convoy HHX 332. At HOMP, the main body of the convoy was met and W-2 remained with it until relieved the next day by Escort Group C-7. W-2 proceeded to St. John's, while the convoy sailed out across the ocean. On the 27th, it was attacked and the Norwegian tanker, Solor, and the US steamship, Ruben Dario, were torpedoed. The damaged ships were able, however, to reach harbour.

ONS 40 was met on the 25th. This convoy was badly scattered by strong winds, but was able to reform with improving weather.

XB 144 was escorted to Boston and, in February 1945, BX 144. On 14 February 1945, W-2 left Halifax with HHX 338. The subsequent voyage was a routine one, although Border Cities obtained a bearing on a doubtful submarine on the 16th. The group was met on the 17th by the mid-ocean group C-5. Since the ship had to pass over convoy papers to the frigate, she approached her and attempted to maintain a position sufficiently close to her to fire the papers across to her by gun. The attempt was unsuccessful, due to heavy following seas and violent squalls.

Because of a wind which was dead astern, Border Cities could not steer well. The ships then went out clear of the convoy and both headed into the wind. HMCS Runnymede being a better steerer under such conditions, approached the minesweeper from the starboard quarter and succeeded in putting a line aboard her quarterdeck. Here, a canister containing the secret documents was attached to the line. Suddenly a violent snow and wind squall struck. Border Cities appeared to be lifted bodily backwards and to starboard on the crest of a great wave. The ships were then about fifty yards apart. Runnymede's helm was put to starboard 30 and speed increased to 13 knots in order to sheer off. The next wave carried Border Cities closer. When it became evident that the ship could not control her steering and was being carried toward the frigate, the latter stopped her engines, as the speed was causing violent pitching and a smother of breaking seas, blotting everything from view. Before the frigate could drop sufficiently behind, however, Border Cities's transom corner struck the other's port bow at the forecastle deck edge, causing damage to plating and leaving a hole at the edge of the deck. Border Cities herself was undamaged.

A damage control party in Runnymede plugged the hole. But the attempt to transfer the documents had to be abandoned. Runnymede received them finally from the Commodore of the convoy the next day when the weather had moderated.

The frigate crossed the ocean with the convoy and, when she reached Londonderry, had temporary repairs carried out on her bow in Harland and Wolf's shipyard in the North Irish city.

A convoy escorted in March 1945 was HHX 344. (Note: Other convoys escorted during March 1945 were HX 342, ONS 44, XB-154 and BX-154.) This was a 20 ship section of a convoy which, when complete, had 74 ships. The British ship, Fort Gaspereau, who had started out from Halifax, was unable to maintain speed with the others due to poor fuel stored in her bunkers, and had to detach on the 17th. Napanee escorted her back to Halifax.

Border Cities and her group continued with their escorting duties through April and May 1945. Because of the decelerated pace of the war, culminating on 8 May 1945 with orders broadcast from German High Command for all U-boats at sea to surrender, they were of a routine nature.

Convoy ON 301, picked up out of St. John's on 16 May, was Border Cities's last. After she and her group sailed with it to New York, they remained for a week in the port and then sailed on the 29th without convoy for Halifax.

=== Postwar service ===
Back to base, Border Cities prepared herself for a short refit, which began on 1 June 1945 and lasted until the 14th. She had several defects which urgently required attention. For several months, in fact, a full scale refit had been proposed for her, first plans having named Liverpool, Nova Scotia for the site, and later ones Saint John, New Brunswick. The end of hostilities and probable early disposal of the ship put an end to these plans.

On 8 June 1945, the ship was formally transferred from the Western Escort Force and Escort Group W-2 to the Halifax Force.

Following her refit, she was sailed to the Halifax approaches to search for a wreck. This was the wreck of HMCS Esquimalt. The Royal Canadian Navy's last victim of the submarine, the Bangor class vessel had been torpedoed off Halifax on 16 April 1945 with the loss of 39 men. The wreck had never been found and, on 16–17 June 1945 and again on the 19th, in the latter case being assisted by HMCS Winnipeg, Border Cities carried out an intensive search.

Each day of the search, an ASDIC expert, Lieutenant R A Nairn (a/s), RCNVR, was embarked. The searchers were fortunate in that weather and water conditions were favourable on all occasions. Every effort was made to use any information, such as survivors' reports, which might be helpful toward the end of locating the wreck. The Halifax East Light Vessel No 6, which had been accurately fixed and used as a datum point for the search, was closed and inquiries made from the Captain where he estimated the sinking had taken place. Many ASDIC echoes were investigated. Echo sounder traces had been made off boulders on the bottom, and some looked promising; when crossed, however, on a course at right angles to the initial run-over, all proved to be false. The search was successful in so far as it was thorough and left no doubt that detection by any future search would be purely a matter of chance.

At the close of June 1945, Border Cities made a voyage to Bermuda. After embarking service personnel for passage, she left Halifax in the early hours of the 30th. After passing two days in the islands she left on 4 July to return to Halifax.

Later in the month, on the 12th, Border Cities made a short cruise with Winnipeg. They left Halifax for Liverpool, Nova Scotia with the intention of visiting St. Andrew's, New Brunswick. and Yarmouth and Chester in Nova Scotia. The unfavourable weather, however, induced a change of plan and the last-named place alone was visited.

The end, however, seemed to be looming larger and, in fact, the ship received orders to sail to Sydney on the 22nd. There she was to come under the Naval Officer in Charge in that port, the transfer to his administration being effected on the same date. The following day, 23 July 1945, she being then in the Cape Breton port, the ship was paid off into maintenance reserve, and Lieutenant-Commander Young relinquished command. She was not permitted to rust away in Sydney. On 7 September 1945, it was announced that she would sail to the west coast in the company of several other Algerine minesweepers.

Pursuant to this decision, sufficient ratings to enable the ship to be steamed to Esquimalt, were drafted from Halifax to Sydney, and the ship was recommissioned with Lieutenant J. Butterfield, RCNR, in command, on 24 October 1945. The next day, she departed from Sydney in company with four other Algerines. Their immediate destination was Halifax. Here they completed storing for the long passage to Esquimalt. Border Cities required some repairs as well.

The group proceeded to Shelburne in November 1945, to complete ammunitioning. Border Cities took this route on the 6th, the day following that on which the final touch was given to her repairs. In company with HMCS Rockcliffe she arrived in Shelburne on the 8th. The same day, she was transferred from the administration of the Naval Officer in Charge, Sydney, to that of the Commanding Officer Pacific Coast, with her accounting base changed from HMCS Protector to HMCS Naden.

On 10 November 1945, the minesweepers steamed out of Shelburne, their bows pointed toward southern waters. There were five of them in the group. After seven days, they arrived at Kingston, Jamaica, where they remained until the 20th. Cristobal, in the Canal Zone, was the next port visited. From here, on the 26th, they entered the Canal. Border Cities at this time was having trouble with her evaporator and, one day, Rockcliffe had to transfer 19 tons of fresh water to her. At Balboa on the 27th, the ships turned their bows northward in the Pacific. HMCS Sault Ste. Marie, however, was held up in the port for nineteen hours due to minor damage sustained during the transit of the Canal. She rejoined on the 30th.

The voyaging ships called at Salina Cruz on 4 December 1945, and stopped in San Pedro, California, from the 11th to 17th. Finally, all five arrived at Esquimalt at 0015, 21 December 1945.

In Esquimalt on 15 January 1946, Border Cities was paid off into maintenance reserve, becoming a tender to the depot ship, HMCS Givenchy. On 1 February, she was allocated to the Reserve Fleet.

In March, it was decided to fit minesweeping gear in two of the Algerines. The two ships chosen for the purpose were Border Cities and Sault Ste. Marie.

Several of the Algerine class minesweepers were docked in early 1947. Of these, it was stated that Border Cities was in the worst condition. She had already been tentatively selected for disposal, but it was noted that she was one of the two ships fitted with minesweeping gear, and this seems to have caused some hesitation.

In the end it was decided to transfer the gear to another of the class, and, in March 1947, she was declared surplus to requirements. On the 3rd, she ceased to be a tender to Givenchy, her pay, victualing and store accounts being transferred from the depot ship to Rockcliffe.

On 26 May 1947, the Naval Staff approved the policy of retaining two Algerine-class minesweepers on each coast fitted with Oropesa minesweeping gear. HMCS Oshawa had been picked to be one of these ships and preparations were begun to transfer Border Cities's equipment to her. Nor was this all that was removed from Border Cities, orders having already been issued that all armament and other stores were to be taken off ships, which had been declared surplus, before they were turned over to the Government disposal agency, the War Assets Corporation.

On 18 April 1947, the ship was recommended for disposal by the Naval Surplus Disposal Committee at Esquimalt. Once she had been accepted by War Assets Corporation, she was towed to Bedwell Bay in Vancouver Harbour, where she, along with another ship picked for disposal, HMCS Levis, was secured to trots.

She was bought by a Victoria firm, Wagner, Stein and Greene Co. The sale was effected in January 1948. The last report of the ship stated that on this date the ship was still in port pending disposal.
