= HMCS St. Boniface =

History

Canada
- Name: St. Boniface
- Namesake: Saint Boniface, Winnipeg
- Operator: Royal Canadian Navy
- Builder: Port Arthur Shipbuilding Co. Ltd.
- Laid down: 21 May 1942
- Launched: 5 November 1942
- Commissioned: 9 October 1943
- Decommissioned: 25 September 1946
- Identification: J332
- Honours and awards: Atlantic 1944–45

General characteristics
- Class & type: Algerine-class minesweeper
- Displacement: 1,030 long tons (1,047 t) (standard); 1,325 long tons (1,346 t) (deep)
- Length: 225 ft (69 m) o/a
- Beam: 35 ft 6 in (10.82 m)
- Draught: 12.25 ft 6 in (3.89 m)
- Installed power: 2 × Admiralty 3-drum boilers; 2,400 ihp (1,800 kW)
- Propulsion: 2 shafts; 2 vertical triple-expansion steam engines
- Speed: 16.5 knots (30.6 km/h; 19.0 mph)
- Range: 5,000 nmi (9,300 km; 5,800 mi) at 10 knots (19 km/h; 12 mph)
- Complement: 85
- Armament: 1 × QF 4 in (102 mm) Mk V anti-aircraft gun; 4 × twin Oerlikon 20 mm cannon; 1 × Hedgehog

HMCS St. Boniface was a reciprocating engine-powered Algerine-class minesweeper built for the Royal Canadian Navy during the Second World War. During the war, the vessel was used as a convoy escort in the Battle of the Atlantic. Following the war, the ship was sold for civilian use as a merchant vessel, last being registered in 1954.

== Design and description ==
The reciprocating group of the Algerine-class minesweepers displaced 1,010–1,030 long tons (1,030–1,050 t) at standard load and 1,305–1,325 long tons (1,326–1,346 t) at deep load The ships measured 225 feet (68.6 m) long overall with a beam of 35 feet 6 inches (10.8 m). They had a draught of 12 feet 3 inches (3.7 m). The ships' complement consisted of 85 officers and ratings.

The reciprocating ships had two vertical triple-expansion steam engines, each driving one shaft, using steam provided by two Admiralty three-drum boilers. The engines produced a total of 2,400 indicated horsepower (1,800 kW) and gave a maximum speed of 16.5 knots (30.6 km/h; 19.0 mph). They carried a maximum of 660 long tons (671 t) of fuel oil that gave them a range of 5,000 nautical miles (9,300 km; 5,800 mi) at 10 knots (19 km/h; 12 mph).

The Algerine class was armed with a QF 4 in (102 mm) Mk V anti-aircraft gun and four twin-gun mounts for Oerlikon 20 mm (0.79 in) cannon. The latter guns were in short supply when the first ships were being completed and they often got a proportion of single mounts. By 1944, single-barrel Bofors 40 mm (1.6 in) mounts began replacing the twin 20 mm mounts on a one for one basis. All of the ships were fitted for four throwers and two rails for depth charges. Many Canadian ships omitted their sweeping gear in exchange for a 24-barrel Hedgehog spigot mortar and a stowage capacity for 90+ depth charges.

== Construction and career ==
St. Boniface was laid down at Port Arthur Shipbuilding Co. Ltd. in Port Arthur, Ontario on 21 May 1942. The ship was launched on 5 November that same year and was commissioned into the Royal Canadian Navy at Port Arthur on 10 September 1943.

The minesweeper made her way up the St. Lawrence River to Halifax and performed workups in the Pictou, Nova Scotia region from November to December 1943. Following workups, the ship was assigned to the Western Escort Force for convoy escort duties in the Battle of the Atlantic. She was made Senior Officer Ship of the escort group W-5 upon joining. As Senior Officer Ship, the commander of the escort would be aboard her during convoy missions. She remained a part of this group until mid-April 1944, when she transferred as Senior Officer Ship of escort group W-4. St. Boniface continued in this role until December 1944 when she put into Halifax to undergo minor repairs. After working up in Bermuda, she returned to escort group W-4.

On 18 April 1945, St. Boniface collided with the merchant vessel SS Empire Chamois in the approaches to Halifax. The minesweeper made Halifax under her own power but had suffered significant damage. The repairs took three months, at which point, W-4 was disbanded in June. In August, the ship was made a training vessel at HMCS Cornwallis, remaining at this post until January 1946. St. Boniface was placed in reserve at Halifax and remained there until being paid off on 25 June 1946. St. Boniface was then sold for mercantile use and was last registered as Bess Barry M. in 1954 under a Panamanian flag.

== See also ==
- List of ships of the Canadian Navy

== Bibliography ==
- Burn, Alan (1999). The Fighting Commodores: The Convoy Commanders in the Second World War. London: Leo Cooper. ISBN 9780850525045.
- Chesneau, Roger, ed. (1980). Conway's All the World's Fighting Ships 1922–1946. Greenwich, UK: Conway Maritime Press. ISBN 0-85177-146-7.
- Lenton, H. T. (1998). British & Empire Warships of the Second World War. Annapolis, Maryland: Naval Institute Press. ISBN 1-55750-048-7.
- Macpherson, Ken & Barrie, Ron (2002). The Ships of Canada's Naval Forces 1910–2002 (3 ed.). St. Catharines, Ontario: Vanwell Publishing. ISBN 1-55125-072-1.
