= James Whalen =

James Whalen may refer to:

- James Whalen (businessman) (1869–1929), Canadian businessman
- James J. Whalen (1927–2001), American psychologist
- James Whalen (American football) (born 1977), former American football player
- Jimmy Whalen (James Henry Whalen, 1920–1944), fighter pilot and recipient of the Distinguished Flying Cross
