= HMS Pelorus (J291) =

Algerine-class minesweeper built for the Royal Navy during World War II

Coordinates: 34°13′12″S 18°28′12″E

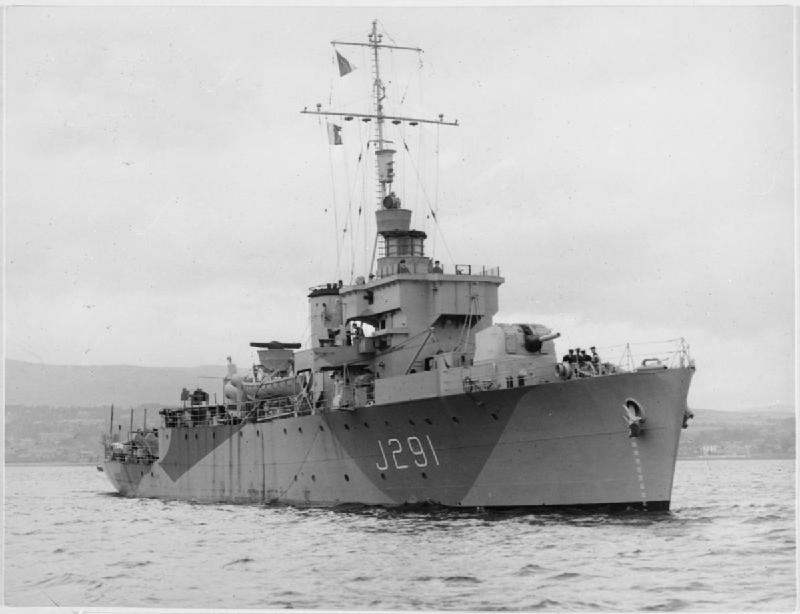
- HMS Pelorus at anchor, 1943

History

United Kingdom
- Name: Pelorus
- Namesake: Pelorus Jack
- Ordered: 1 January 1942
- Builder: Lobnitz, Renfrew, Scotland
- Laid down: 8 October 1942
- Launched: 18 June 1943
- Commissioned: 7 October 1943
- Decommissioned: May 1946
- Identification: Pennant number: J291
- Fate: Sold to the South African Navy, 1947

South Africa
- Namesake: Pietermaritzburg
- Acquired: Purchased from the Royal Navy, 1947
- Renamed: Pietermaritzburg, 21 January 1948
- Stricken: 1991
- Nickname(s): PMB
- Fate: Scuttled, 12 November 1994

General characteristics (as built)
- Class & type: Algerine-class minesweeper
- Displacement: 1,030 long tons (1,047 t) (standard); 1,325 long tons (1,346 t) (deep load)
- Length: 225 ft (68.6 m) o/a
- Beam: 35 ft 6 in (10.8 m)
- Draught: 12 ft 3 in (3.7 m)
- Installed power: 2 × Admiralty 3-drum boilers; 2,400 ihp (1,800 kW)
- Propulsion: 2 shafts; 2 × vertical triple-expansion steam engines
- Speed: 16.5 knots (30.6 km/h; 19.0 mph)
- Range: 5,000 nmi (9,300 km; 5,800 mi) at 10 knots (19 km/h; 12 mph)
- Complement: 85
- Sensors & processing systems: Type 271 surface-search radar; Type 291 air-search radar
- Armament: 1 × QF 4 in (102 mm) Mk V DP gun; 4 × single Oerlikon 20 mm (0.8 in) AA guns

HMS Pelorus (pennant number: J291) was an Algerine-class minesweeper built for the Royal Navy (RN) during World War II. Upon completion, the ship became the flotilla leader of the 7th Minesweeper Flotilla, clearing mines off the east coast of England. In June 1944, the flotilla was assigned to sweep one of the beaches during the Normandy landings until she struck a mine the following month. After her repairs were completed, Pelorus was reassigned to the English Channel and the 6th Minesweeping Flotilla. The flotilla was transferred to the Indian Ocean in 1945 and spent some time escorting convoys. They participated in Operation Collie, a bombardment of Japanese positions in the Nicobar Islands, in July and then swept the Strait of Malacca and the approaches to Singapore in August.

After the war, she was sold to the South African Navy and renamed HMSAS Pietermaritzburg. The ship was later converted into a midshipmans' training ship during the early 1960s. She served as a barracks ship from 1968 to 1991 when Pietermaritzburg was listed for disposal. The ship was scuttled as an artificial reef off the South African coast in 1994.

== Description ==
Pelorus displaced 1,030 long tons (1,047 t) at standard load and 1,325 long tons (1,346 t) at deep load. The ship had an overall length of 225 feet (68.6 m), a beam of 35 feet 6 inches (10.8 m) and a deep draught of 12 feet 3 inches (3.7 m). She was powered by a pair of vertical triple-expansion steam engines, each driving one propeller shaft, using steam provided by two Admiralty three-drum boilers. The engines developed a total of 2,400 indicated horsepower (1,800 kW) which gave a maximum speed of 16.5 knots (30.6 km/h; 19.0 mph). The ship carried enough fuel oil that she had a range of 5,000 nautical miles (9,300 km; 5,800 mi) at 10 knots (19 km/h; 12 mph). The ship was armed with a single 4-inch (102 mm) Mk V dual-purpose gun and four single mounts for Oerlikon 20 mm (0.8 in) light anti-aircraft (AA) guns. For anti-submarine work, Pelorus was fitted with two depth charge rails, and four depth charge throwers. The ship was equipped with a Type 271 surface-search radar and a Type 291 air-search radar. Her crew numbered 85 officers and ratings.

During the war the two single Oerlikon mounts on the bridge wings were replaced by twin power-driven mounts and the two remaining single mounts aft were superseded by two single 40 mm (1.6 in) Bofors AA guns before the ship sailed for the Far East. In preparation for her reclassification as a training ship, Pietermaritzburg had her sweeping gear removed and was rearmed with her main armament replaced by a twin-gun turret fitted with more powerful 4-inch Mk XVI guns in 1961–62. The Bofors guns were moved to the roof of the enlarged aft superstructure. Her complement now consisted of 8 officers, 73 ratings, 10 midshipmen and 50 trainees. She was refitted in 1971.

== Construction and career ==
Pelorus was named after Pelorus Jack, a Risso's dolphin that often escorted ships through French Pass in New Zealand. The ship was ordered on 1 January 1942 from Lobnitz of Renfrew, Scotland and laid down on 8 October. She was launched on 18 June 1943 and completed two months later on 7 October. The ship was assigned to the newly formed 7th Minesweeping Flotilla upon completion and served as the flotilla leader. The flotilla was tasked with clearing mines off the east coast of England until June 1944 when they were assigned to sweep the minefields protecting Juno Beach during the Normandy landings. Pelorus led the flotilla on 6 June and was thus the leading ship of the entire invasion fleet. While sweeping the approaches to Cherbourg, she struck a mine that damaged the port engine and propeller. The ship was under repair for three months and was transferred to the 6th Minesweeping Flotilla at Plymouth when they were completed.

The flotilla sailed for the Far East on 8 April 1945 and was assigned convoy escort duties on arrival. On 2 July, they swept the approaches to the Nicobar Islands during Operation Collie and destroyed 167 mines. As the Pacific War was ending on 15 August, they swept the Strait of Malacca and the approaches to Singapore. Together with the light cruiser Cleopatra, Pelorus was one of the first British ships to re-enter Singapore harbour. She returned home in May 1946 and was paid off.

In 1947 the ship was sold to the South African Navy, together with her sister ship, Rosamund, and departed England on 22 November after a refresher course at the minesweeping school at HMS Lochinvar, Port Edgar, Scotland. The sisters arrived at Cape Town on 24 December, making stops at Gibraltar, Freetown and Walvis Bay en route. She was rechristened by the mayor of the city, A. E. Hirst, on 21 January 1948. The navy had originally intended to rename the ship Maritzburg, but decided to use the city's full name after protests. In November of that year, the sisters exercised with the British 3rd Aircraft Carrier Squadron. Later that month, together with the frigate Natal, they visited ports in Portuguese Mozambique, returning to Durban on 12 December. While serving as a midshipmans' training ship, Pietermaritzburg became the largest South African warship to visit Knysna in September 1953. The ship and her sister were placed in reserve for a time in the late 1950s.

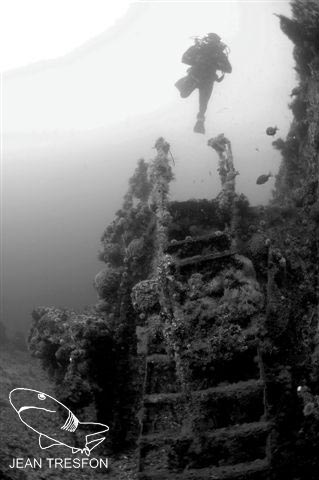
A diver over the wreck

Pietermaritzburg re-commissioned as a dedicated training ship on 30 August 1962. While participating the training exercise Capex 63 with the Royal Navy, the ship accidentally rammed the British frigate Leopard. Although her bow was crushed by the collision, both ships were able to steam back to Simon's Town, South Africa for repairs. The subsequent inquiry found officers from both ships negligent. She was placed back in reserve in July 1964 and became an accommodation ship at Simon's Town for the navy's minesweeping flotilla on 17 June 1968. Pietermaritzburg was listed for disposal in 1991 and the navy made the decision to dispose of her as an artificial reef.

Pietermaritzburg was scuttled on 12 November 1994 to make an artificial reef at Miller's Point near Simon's Town. The wreck settled upright on the sand at a maximum depth of 22 metres (72 ft). It has begun to collapse and the interior is much less accessible than it used to be. The wreck and surrounding 300 metres (980 ft) was declared a South African National Heritage Site on 23 August 2013 after legal salvage efforts in 2012 had badly damaged the wreck.

== See also ==
- Shipwrecks of Cape Town
