= Sault Ste. Marie =

Sault Ste. Marie may refer to:

== People ==
- Sault Ste. Marie Tribe of Chippewa Indians, a Native American tribe in Michigan

== Places ==
- Sault Ste. Marie, Ontario, Canada
  - Sault Ste. Marie (federal electoral district), a Canadian federal electoral district serving the Ontario city
  - Sault Ste. Marie (provincial electoral district), a Canadian provincial electoral district serving the Ontario city
- Sault Ste. Marie, Michigan, United States

== Other uses ==
- HMCS Sault Ste. Marie, a ship of the Royal Canadian Navy
