= HMCS Kapuskasing =

Royal Canadian Navy minesweeper

History

Canada
- Name: Kapuskasing
- Namesake: Kapuskasing, Ontario
- Ordered: 12 December 1941
- Builder: Port Arthur Shipbuilding Co. Ltd., Port Arthur
- Laid down: 19 December 1942
- Launched: 22 July 1943
- Commissioned: 17 August 1944
- Decommissioned: 27 March 1946
- Identification: pennant number: J236
- Recommissioned: 1949
- Decommissioned: 1972
- Identification: pennant number: 171
- Honors and awards: Atlantic, 1944–1945
- Fate: Expended as target 1978
- Notes: Colours: White and dark green
- Badge: Vert, shakefork couped, barry wavy argent and azure

General characteristics
- Class & type: Algerine-class minesweeper
- Displacement: 1,030 long tons (1,047 t) (standard); 1,325 long tons (1,346 t) (deep)
- Length: 225 ft (69 m) o/a
- Beam: 35 ft 6 in (10.82 m)
- Draught: 12.25 ft 6 in (3.89 m)
- Installed power: 2 × Admiralty 3-drum boilers; 2,400 ihp (1,800 kW)
- Propulsion: 2 shafts; 2 vertical triple-expansion steam engines
- Speed: 16.5 knots (30.6 km/h; 19.0 mph)
- Range: 5,000 nmi (9,300 km; 5,800 mi) at 10 knots (19 km/h; 12 mph)
- Complement: 85
- Armament: 1 × QF 4 in (102 mm) Mk V anti-aircraft gun; 4 × twin Oerlikon 20 mm cannon; 1 × Hedgehog

HMCS Kapuskasing was an Algerine-class minesweeper that served in the Royal Canadian Navy during the Second World War. The vessel was primarily used as a convoy escort in the Battle of the Atlantic. Following the war she saw service as a hydrographic survey ship with the Department of Mines. She was named for Kapuskasing, Ontario.

== Design and description ==
The reciprocating group displaced 1,010–1,030 long tons (1,030–1,050 t) at standard load and 1,305–1,325 long tons (1,326–1,346 t) at deep load The ships measured 225 feet (68.6 m) long overall with a beam of 35 feet 6 inches (10.8 m). They had a draught of 12 feet 3 inches (3.7 m). The ships' complement consisted of 85 officers and ratings.

The reciprocating ships had two vertical triple-expansion steam engines, each driving one shaft, using steam provided by two Admiralty three-drum boilers. The engines produced a total of 2,400 indicated horsepower (1,800 kW) and gave a maximum speed of 16.5 knots (30.6 km/h; 19.0 mph). They carried a maximum of 660 long tons (671 t) of fuel oil that gave them a range of 5,000 nautical miles (9,300 km; 5,800 mi) at 10 knots (19 km/h; 12 mph).

The Algerine class was armed with a QF 4 in (102 mm) Mk V anti-aircraft gun and four twin-gun mounts for Oerlikon 20 mm cannon. The latter guns were in short supply when the first ships were being completed and they often got a proportion of single mounts. By 1944, single-barrel Bofors 40 mm mounts began replacing the twin 20 mm mounts on a one for one basis. All of the ships were fitted for four throwers and two rails for depth charges. Many Canadian ships omitted their sweeping gear in exchange for a 24-barrel Hedgehog spigot mortar and a stowage capacity for 90+ depth charges.

== Construction and career ==
Kapuskasing was ordered on 12 December 1941. The ship was laid down on 19 December 1942 by Port Arthur Shipbuilding Co. Ltd. at Port Arthur, Ontario and launched 22 July 1943. The vessel was commissioned into the Royal Canadian Navy on 17 August 1944 at Port Arthur, with the pennant J326.

After commissioning, Kapuskasing was sent to Bermuda to work up. Upon the vessel's return to Canadian waters, she was assigned to the Western Escort Force as Senior Officer's Ship of escort group W-1. As Senior Officer Ship, the commander of the escort would be aboard her during convoy missions. Primarily used as a convoy escort, the ship remained with the group until the end of hostilities in the Atlantic Ocean. The group was disbanded in June 1945 and she was placed in maintenance reserve at Sydney, Nova Scotia.

In November 1945, Kapuskasing underwent a refit at Halifax and upon its completion, was paid off into the reserve on 27 March 1946.

In 1949, Kapuskasing was recommissioned and was assigned pennant 171. The vessel was loaned to the Department of Mines and Technical Surveys for use as a hydrographic survey platform. The ship was returned to the Royal Canadian Navy in 1972. On 3 October 1978, she was taken to sea and sunk as a naval target.

== See also ==
- List of ships of the Canadian Navy
