= HMCS Fort Frances =

Royal Canadian Navy minesweeper

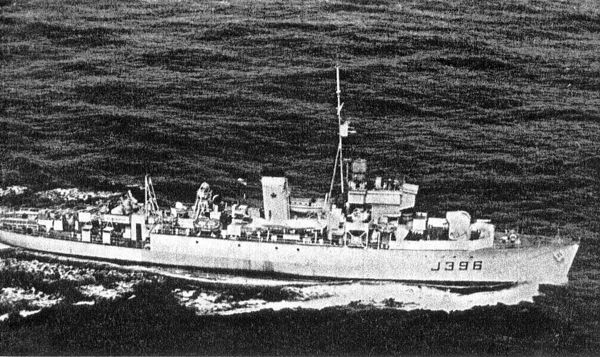
- HMCS Fort Frances

History

Canada
- Name: Fort Frances
- Namesake: Fort Frances, Ontario
- Ordered: 25 November 1942
- Builder: Port Arthur Shipbuilding Co. Ltd., Port Arthur
- Laid down: 11 May 1943
- Launched: 30 October 1943
- Commissioned: 28 October 1944
- Decommissioned: 3 August 1945
- Recommissioned: 23 October 1945
- Decommissioned: 5 April 1946
- Identification: Pennant number: J396
- Honours and awards: Atlantic 1945
- Fate: Transferred to Department of Mines and Technical Surveys 1948
- Badge: Azure, a unicorn's head erased argent, armed and crine, or langued gules, gorged with a plain collar of gold on which a plate edged or and charged with a maple leaf gules

General characteristics
- Class & type: Algerine-class minesweeper
- Displacement: 1,030 long tons (1,047 t) (standard); 1,325 long tons (1,346 t) (deep)
- Length: 225 ft (69 m) o/a
- Beam: 35 ft 6 in (10.82 m)
- Draught: 12.25 ft 6 in (3.89 m)
- Installed power: 2 × Admiralty 3-drum boilers; 2,400 ihp (1,800 kW)
- Propulsion: 2 shafts; 2 vertical triple-expansion steam engines
- Speed: 16.5 knots (30.6 km/h; 19.0 mph)
- Range: 5,000 nmi (9,300 km; 5,800 mi) at 10 knots (19 km/h; 12 mph)
- Complement: 85
- Armament: 1 × QF 4 in (102 mm) Mk V anti-aircraft gun; 4 × twin Oerlikon 20 mm cannon; 1 × Hedgehog

HMCS Fort Frances was an Algerine-class minesweeper that served in the Royal Canadian Navy during the Second World War. She served primarily as a coastal convoy escort in the Battle of the Atlantic. The ship was named for Fort Frances, a town in northwestern Ontario. Following the war, the vessel was transferred to the Department of Mines and Technical Surveys and used for hydrographic and oceanographic survey. The vessel was discarded in 1974 and broken up for scrap.

== Design and description ==
The reciprocating group displaced 1,010–1,030 long tons (1,030–1,050 t) at standard load and 1,305–1,325 long tons (1,326–1,346 t) at deep load The ships measured 225 feet (68.6 m) long overall with a beam of 35 feet 6 inches (10.8 m). They had a draught of 12 feet 3 inches (3.7 m). The ships' complement consisted of 85 officers and ratings.

The reciprocating ships had two vertical triple-expansion steam engines, each driving one shaft, using steam provided by two Admiralty three-drum boilers. The engines produced a total of 2,400 indicated horsepower (1,800 kW) and gave a maximum speed of 16.5 knots (30.6 km/h; 19.0 mph). They carried a maximum of 660 long tons (671 t) of fuel oil that gave them a range of 5,000 nautical miles (9,300 km; 5,800 mi) at 10 knots (19 km/h; 12 mph).

The Algerine class was armed with a QF 4 in (102 mm) Mk V anti-aircraft gun and four twin-gun mounts for Oerlikon 20 mm cannon. The latter guns were in short supply when the first ships were being completed and they often got a proportion of single mounts. By 1944, single-barrel Bofors 40 mm mounts began replacing the twin 20 mm mounts on a one for one basis. All of the ships were fitted for four throwers and two rails for depth charges. Many Canadian ships omitted their sweeping gear in exchange for a 24-barrel Hedgehog spigot mortar and a stowage capacity for 90+ depth charges.

== Construction and career ==
Fort Frances was ordered on 25 November 1942 as part of the 1943 building program. The minesweeper was laid down on 11 May 1943 by Port Arthur Shipbuilding Company Ltd. at Port Arthur, Ontario and launched on 30 October. The ship was commissioned into the Royal Canadian Navy on 28 October 1944 at Port Arthur.

After working up in Bermuda in January 1945, Fort Frances returned to Halifax, Nova Scotia and joined the Western Escort Force convoy escort groups W-8 and W-9 for short periods before the end of the war in Europe. The minesweeper was paid off into maintenance reserve on 3 August 1945. The ship was recommissioned on 23 October 1945 and this deployment lasted until 5 April 1946, when Fort Frances was paid off for the final time.

In 1948, Fort Frances was transferred to the Department of Mines and Technical Surveys for use as a hydrographic ship. In 1958 she was converted into an oceanographic survey ship. Three laboratories were installed along with the ability to carry up to eight scientists, her main purpose being underwater acoustic research. Fort Frances served in this duty until she was sold in 1974 for scrap and broken up. In 2009, Fort Frances was presented with a framed history of the ship in commemoration of the Canadian Naval Centennial.

== See also ==
- List of ships of the Canadian Navy

== Bibliography ==
- Arbuckle, J. Graeme (1987). Badges of the Canadian Navy. Halifax, Nova Scotia: Nimbus Publishing. ISBN 0-920852-49-1.
- Chesneau, Roger, ed. (1980). Conway's All the World's Fighting Ships 1922–1946. Greenwich, UK: Conway Maritime Press. ISBN 0-85177-146-7.
- Colledge, J. J.; Warlow, Ben (2006) [1969]. Ships of the Royal Navy: The Complete Record of All Fighting Ships of the Royal Navy from the 15th Century to the Present (3rd Rev ed.). London: Chatham Publishing. ISBN 978-1-86176-281-8. OCLC 67375475.
- Lenton, H. T. (1998). British & Empire Warships of the Second World War. Annapolis, Maryland: Naval Institute Press. ISBN 1-55750-048-7.
- Macpherson, Ken; Barrie, Ron (2002). The Ships of Canada's Naval Forces 1910–2002 (3 ed.). St. Catharines, Ontario: Vanwell Publishing. ISBN 1-55125-072-1.
