= HMSAS Bloemfontein =

Algerine-class minesweeper built for the Royal Navy in Canada during World War II

History

United Kingdom
- Name: Rosamund
- Ordered: 15 March 1943
- Builder: Port Arthur Shipbuilding Company, Port Arthur, Ontario, Canada
- Laid down: 26 April 1944
- Launched: 20 December 1944
- Completed: 10 July 1945
- Decommissioned: 1947
- Identification: Pennant number: J439
- Fate: Sold to the South African Navy, 1947

South Africa
- Namesake: Bloemfontein
- Acquired: Purchased from the Royal Navy, 1947
- Renamed: Bloemfontein, mid-1948
- Reclassified: As a training ship, April 1961
- Fate: Sunk as a target, 5 June 1967

General characteristics (as built)
- Class & type: Algerine-class minesweeper
- Displacement: 950 long tons (965 t) (standard); 1,250 long tons (1,270 t) (deep load)
- Length: 225 ft (68.6 m) o/a
- Beam: 35 ft 6 in (10.8 m)
- Draught: 12 ft 3 in (3.7 m)
- Installed power: 2 × Admiralty 3-drum boilers; 2,400 ihp (1,800 kW)
- Propulsion: 2 shafts; 2 × vertical triple-expansion steam engines
- Speed: 16.5 knots (30.6 km/h; 19.0 mph)
- Range: 5,000 nmi (9,300 km; 5,800 mi) at 10 knots (19 km/h; 12 mph)
- Complement: 85
- Sensors & processing systems: Type 271 surface-search radar; Type 291 air-search radar
- Armament: 1 × QF 4 in (102 mm) Mk V DP gun; 2 × twin and 2 × single Oerlikon 20 mm (0.8 in) AA guns

HMSAS Bloemfontein was an Algerine-class minesweeper built for the Royal Navy in Canada during World War II. The ship was originally HMS Rosamund (pennant number: J439) and spent several years clearing minefields in European waters after she was completed in 1945 before she was placed in reserve. Rosamund was purchased by South Africa in 1947 and renamed HMSAS Bloemfontein in 1948.

The ship spent most of its early career in the South African Navy training or making good-will visits to foreign countries. She was laid up in the late 1950s and was recommissioned in 1961 to serve as an interim training ship until the shore-based training establishment then under construction was completed. This occurred in 1963 and Bloemfontein returned briefly to reserve before she was deemed surplus to requirements. The ship was sunk as a target in 1967.

== Description ==
Bloemfontein displaced 950 long tons (965 t) at standard load and 1,250 long tons (1,270 t) at deep load. The ship had an overall length of 225 feet (68.6 m), a beam of 35 feet 6 inches (10.8 m) and a deep draught of 12 feet 3 inches (3.7 m). She was powered by a pair of vertical triple-expansion steam engines, each driving one propeller shaft, using steam provided by two Admiralty three-drum boilers. The engines developed a total of 2,400 indicated horsepower (1,800 kW) which gave a maximum speed of 16.5 knots (30.6 km/h; 19.0 mph). The ship carried 230 long tons (234 t) of fuel oil that she had a range of 5,000 nautical miles (9,300 km; 5,800 mi) at 10 knots (19 km/h; 12 mph). The ship was armed with a single four-inch (102 mm) Mk V dual-purpose gun and two twin and two single mounts for Oerlikon 20-millimetre (0.8 in) light anti-aircraft (AA) guns. For anti-submarine work, Bloemfontein was fitted with two depth charge rails, and four depth charge throwers for 92 depth charges. The ship was also equipped with a Type 271 surface-search radar and a Type 291 air-search radar. Her crew numbered 85 officers and ratings.

== Construction and career ==
Bloemfontein was ordered on 15 March 1943 from the Port Arthur Shipbuilding Company of Port Arthur, Ontario, Canada, and laid down on 26 April 1944 with the name of Rosamund. The ship was the first of her name to serve in the Royal Navy. She was launched on 20 December and completed six months later on 10 July 1945. The ship was assigned to clear the coastal waters of Western Europe of minefields laid during the war and did so until she was laid up in 1947 at Devonport Royal Dockyard. Rosamund was purchased by the South African Navy later that year, together with her sister ship, Pelorus. The sisters departed England on 22 November after a refresher course at the minesweeping school at HMS Lochinvar, Port Edgar, Scotland. They arrived at Cape Town on 24 December, making stops at Gibraltar, Freetown and Walvis Bay en route.

Rosamund was rechristened as Bloemfontein in East London during that city's centenary celebrations in mid-1948. In August she made her first supply run to Marion Island. In November of that year, the sisters exercised with the British 3rd Aircraft Carrier Squadron. Later that month, together with the frigate Natal, they visited ports in Portuguese Mozambique, returning to Durban on 12 December. The sisters were placed in reserve in the late 1950s, after the navy had purchased 10 Ton-class minesweepers. Bloemfontein was recommissioned in April 1961 to serve as a stationary training ship in Simon's Town until the navy's training facility SAS Simonsberg was completed in July 1963. The navy decided that the ship was no longer needed and she was stripped of useful equipment before being sunk as a target in False Bay by the frigate President Kruger and the minesweeper SAS Johannesburg on 5 June 1967.

== See also ==
- Shipwrecks of Cape Town
