= HMCS New Liskeard =

1944 Royal Canadian Navy minesweeper

History

Canada
- Name: New Liskeard
- Namesake: New Liskeard, Ontario
- Builder: Port Arthur Shipbuilding Co. Ltd., Port Arthur
- Laid down: 7 August 1942
- Launched: 14 January 1944
- Commissioned: 21 November 1944
- Decommissioned: 4 August 1946
- Identification: Pennant number J397
- Recommissioned: 9 April 1946
- Decommissioned: 22 April 1958
- Identification: 261
- Honours and awards: Atlantic, 1945
- Fate: Scrapped, 1969
- Badge: Purpure, a pile argent on which a Lombardy Poplar proper, standing on a stone-strewn and barren mount or.

General characteristics
- Class & type: Algerine-class minesweeper
- Displacement: 1,030 long tons (1,047 t) (standard); 1,325 long tons (1,346 t) (deep)
- Length: 225 ft (69 m) o/a
- Beam: 35 ft 6 in (10.82 m)
- Draught: 12.25 ft 6 in (3.89 m)
- Installed power: 2 × Admiralty 3-drum boilers; 2,400 ihp (1,800 kW)
- Propulsion: 2 shafts; 2 vertical triple-expansion steam engines
- Speed: 16.5 knots (30.6 km/h; 19.0 mph)
- Range: 5,000 nmi (9,300 km; 5,800 mi) at 10 knots (19 km/h; 12 mph)
- Complement: 85
- Armament: 1 × QF 4 in (102 mm) Mk V anti-aircraft gun; 4 × twin Oerlikon 20 mm cannon; 1 × Hedgehog

HMCS New Liskeard was a reciprocating engine-powered Algerine-class minesweeper built for the Royal Canadian Navy during the Second World War. Following the war, the ship saw service first as a training ship and then later, as an oceanographic research vessel. She remained in service until 1969.

== Design and description ==
The reciprocating group displaced 1,010–1,030 long tons (1,030–1,050 t) at standard load and 1,305–1,325 long tons (1,326–1,346 t) at deep load The ships measured 225 feet (68.6 m) long overall with a beam of 35 feet 6 inches (10.8 m). They had a draught of 12 feet 3 inches (3.7 m). The ships' complement consisted of 85 officers and ratings.

The reciprocating ships had two vertical triple-expansion steam engines, each driving one shaft, using steam provided by two Admiralty three-drum boilers. The engines produced a total of 2,400 indicated horsepower (1,800 kW) and gave a maximum speed of 16.5 knots (30.6 km/h; 19.0 mph). They carried a maximum of 660 long tons (671 t) of fuel oil that gave them a range of 5,000 nautical miles (9,300 km; 5,800 mi) at 10 knots (19 km/h; 12 mph).

The Algerine class was armed with a QF 4 in (102 mm) Mk V anti-aircraft gun and four twin-gun mounts for Oerlikon 20 mm cannon. The latter guns were in short supply when the first ships were being completed and they often got a proportion of single mounts. By 1944, single-barrel Bofors 40 mm mounts began replacing the twin 20 mm mounts on a one for one basis. All of the ships were fitted for four throwers and two rails for depth charges. Many Canadian ships omitted their sweeping gear in exchange for a 24-barrel Hedgehog spigot mortar and a stowage capacity for 90+ depth charges.

== Construction and career ==
New Liskeard, named for New Liskeard, Ontario, was laid down on 8 July 1943 by Port Arthur Shipbuilding Co. Ltd. at Port Arthur, Ontario. The ship was launched on 14 January 1944 and was commissioned into the Royal Canadian Navy on 21 November 1944 at Port Arthur.

Following her commissioning, New Liskeard sailed down the St. Lawrence River to Halifax, Nova Scotia. The minesweeper was then dispatched to Bermuda for workups before returning to Halifax. Once there the vessel joined the Western Escort Force in April 1945 for convoy escort duties in the Battle of the Atlantic. She was assigned to escort group W-8 and remained with them until the group's disbandment in June 1945.

New Liskeard was then assigned to HMCS Cornwallis as a training ship in July. This position lasted until September when the minesweeper was placed in reserve at Sydney, Nova Scotia. The ship was then taken to Halifax, where she remained in reserve until the end of 1945. After refitting at Halifax, the ship was recommissioned on 9 April 1946 as a training vessel. On 21 October 1947, New Liskeard helped sink the surrendered U-190 off the coast of Nova Scotia in a training exercise. In 1948, the minesweeper was used for oceanographic duties. New Liskeard was paid off on 22 April 1958.

New Liskeard was fully converted into an oceanographic research vessel. The ship was outfitted with two oceanographic and acoustic laboratories. The ship performed this role until 1 May 1969. That same year, she was taken to Dartmouth Cove, Nova Scotia and broken up.

== See also ==
- List of ships of the Canadian Navy

== Bibliography ==
- Arbuckle, J. Graeme (1987). Badges of the Canadian Navy. Halifax, Nova Scotia: Nimbus Publishing. ISBN 0-920852-49-1.
- Chesneau, Roger, ed. (1980). Conway's All the World's Fighting Ships 1922–1946. Greenwich, UK: Conway Maritime Press. ISBN 0-85177-146-7.
- Colledge, J. J.; Warlow, Ben (2006) [1969]. Ships of the Royal Navy: The Complete Record of All Fighting Ships of the Royal Navy from the 15th Century to the Present (3rd Rev ed.). London: Chatham Publishing. ISBN 978-1-86176-281-8. OCLC 67375475.
- Lenton, H. T. (1998). British & Empire Warships of the Second World War. Annapolis, Maryland: Naval Institute Press. ISBN 1-55750-048-7.
- Macpherson, Ken; Barrie, Ron (2002). The Ships of Canada's Naval Forces 1910–2002 (3 ed.). St. Catharines, Ontario: Vanwell Publishing. ISBN 1-55125-072-1.
- Skaarup, Harold A. Canadian Warbird Survivors: A Handbook on Where to Find Them. Lincoln, Nebraska: iUniverse. ISBN 978-0-595-20668-1.
