= HMCS Kenora =

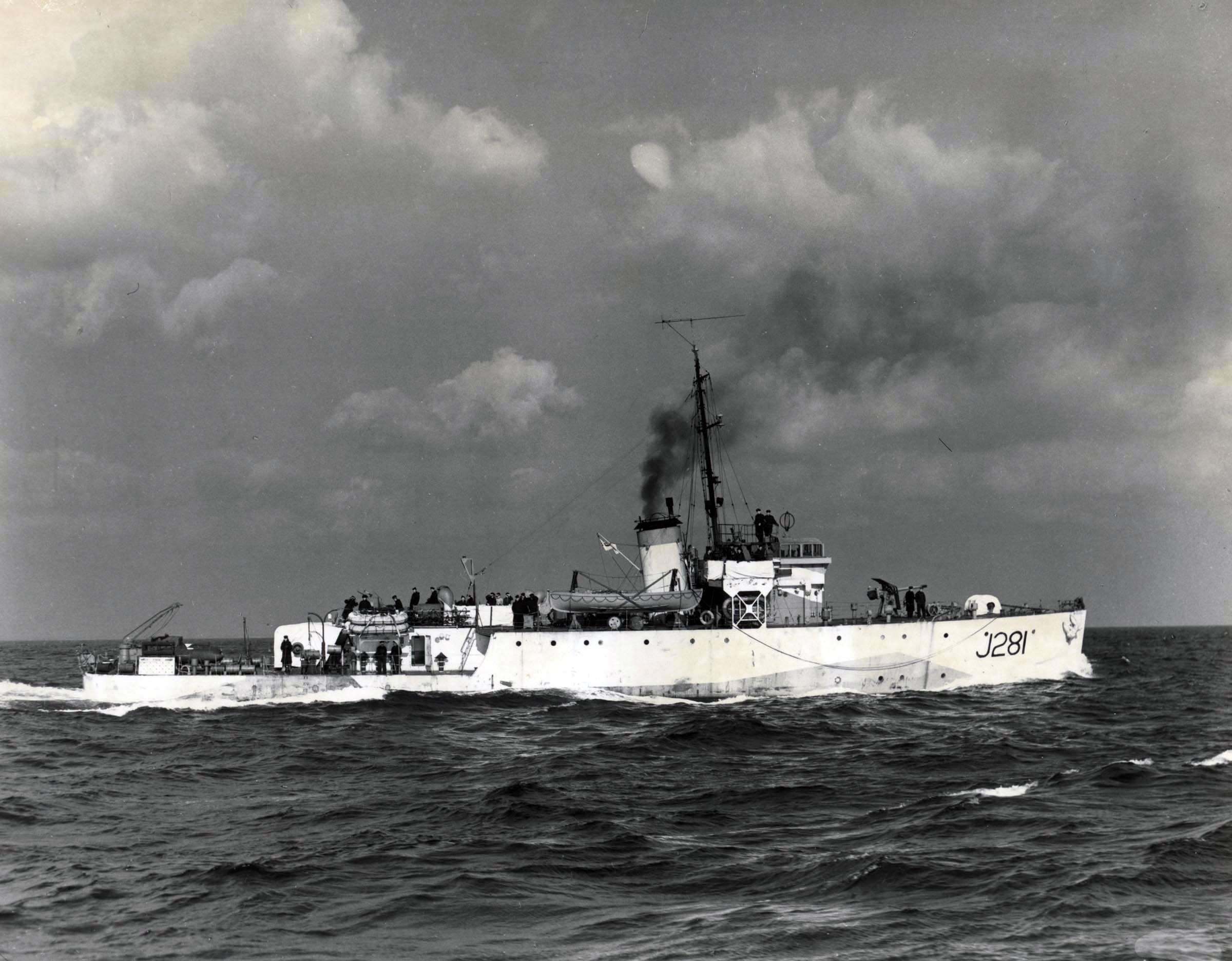

History

Canada
- Name: Kenora
- Namesake: Kenora, Ontario
- Builder: Port Arthur Shipbuilding Co., Port Arthur
- Laid down: 18 August 1941
- Launched: 20 December 1941
- Commissioned: 6 August 1942
- Decommissioned: 6 October 1945
- Identification: Pennant number: J281
- Honours and awards: Gulf of St. Lawrence 1942, Atlantic 1942-45, Normandy 1944
- Fate: Transferred to Turkish Navy 1957

Turkey
- Name: Bandirma
- Acquired: 29 November 1957
- Fate: Discarded 1972

General characteristics
- Class & type: Bangor-class minesweeper
- Displacement: 672 long tons (683 t)
- Length: 180 ft (54.9 m) oa
- Beam: 28 ft 6 in (8.7 m)
- Draught: 9 ft 9 in (3.0 m)
- Propulsion: 2 Admiralty 3-drum water tube boilers, 2 shafts, vertical triple-expansion reciprocating engines, 2,400 ihp (1,790 kW)
- Speed: 16.5 knots (31 km/h)
- Complement: 83
- Armament: 1 × 12-pounder (3 in (76 mm)) 12 cwt HA gun; 1 x QF 2 pdr Mark VIII; 2 × QF 20 mm Oerlikon guns; 40 depth charges as escort

HMCS Kenora (pennant J281) was a Bangor-class minesweeper that served with the Royal Canadian Navy during the Second World War. Entering service in 1942, the minesweeper took part in the Battle of the Atlantic as a convoy escort and in the invasion of Normandy. Following the war, the vessel was laid up until reacquired in 1952 during the Korean War. Never re-entering service with the Royal Canadian Navy, Kenora was sold to the Turkish Navy in 1957. Renamed Bandirma by the Turkish Navy, the vessel was discarded in 1972.

== Design and description ==
A British design, the Bangor-class minesweepers were smaller than the preceding Halcyon-class minesweepers in British service, but larger than the Fundy class in Canadian service. They came in two versions powered by different engines; those with a diesel engines and those with vertical triple-expansion steam engines. Kenora was of the latter design and was larger than her diesel-engined cousins. The minesweeper was 180 feet (54.9 m) long overall, had a beam of 28 feet 6 inches (8.7 m) and a draught of 9 feet 9 inches (3.0 m). Kenora had a displacement of 672 long tons (683 t). She had a complement of 6 officers and 77 enlisted.

Kenora had two vertical triple-expansion steam engines, each driving one shaft, using steam provided by two Admiralty three-drum boilers. The engines produced a total of 2,400 indicated horsepower (1,800 kW) and gave a maximum speed of 16.5 knots (30.6 km/h; 19.0 mph). The minesweeper could carry a maximum of 150 long tons (152 t) of fuel oil.

Kenora was armed with a single quick-firing (QF) 12-pounder (3 in (76 mm)) 12 cwt HA gun mounted forward. (Note: "Cwt" is the abbreviation for hundredweight, 20 cwt referring to the weight of the gun.) The ship was also fitted with a QF 2-pounder Mark VIII aft and were eventually fitted with single-mounted QF 20 mm Oerlikon guns on the bridge wings. The 2-pounder gun was later replaced with a twin 20 mm Oerlikon mount. Those ships assigned to convoy duty had two depth charge launchers and four chutes to deploy the 40 depth charges they carried.

== Operational history ==
The minesweeper was ordered as part of the 1941–1942 construction programme. The ship's keel was laid down on 18 August 1941 by Port Arthur Shipbuilding Co at their yard in Port Arthur, Ontario. Named for a community in Ontario, Kenora was launched on 20 December 1941. The ship was commissioned on 6 August 1942 at Port Arthur.

Kenora arrived at Halifax, Nova Scotia on 7 September and after work ups, the vessel was assigned to the Western Local Escort Force (WLEF) as a convoy escort in the Battle of the Atlantic. In June 1943, the minesweeper was assigned to the WLEF escort group W8. She remained a member of the group until February 1944, when the Kenora sailed for Europe as part of Canada's contribution to the invasion of Normandy.

Upon arrival in March, Kenora was assigned to the 14th Minesweeping Flotilla. During the invasion, Kenora and her fellow minesweepers swept and marked channels through the German minefields leading into the invasion beaches in the American sector. The 14th Minesweeping Flotilla swept the Baie de la Seine an hour after the assault began. The Canadian Bangors spent most of June sweeping Channel 14, the widened area that combined assault channels 1 to 4.

The minesweepers spent the following months clearing the shipping lanes between the United Kingdom and mainland Europe. Towards the end of 1944, the minesweepers were also being used as a cross channel convoy escorts. In October 1944, Kenora returned to Canada to undergo a refit at Liverpool, Nova Scotia. The ship returned to European waters in February 1945, joining the 31st Minesweeping Flotilla upon her arrival.

In April 1945, the 31st Minesweeping Flotilla was assigned to the last large-scale combined operation in the European theatre. Sailing to the Gironde estuary on 12 April, the minesweeping flotilla swept an invasion channel for the attack force landing in the area. Once their minesweeping duties were completed, the minesweepers performed an anti-submarine patrol in the area. They continued in these duties until 16 April when the minesweepers returned to Plymouth. While returning to Plymouth, the flotilla encountered a German trawler and captured it. Kenora and the 31st Minesweeping Flotilla spent the next five months sweeping the English Channel. Kenora remained in European waters until 4 September, when the minesweeper returned to Canada.

After returning to Canada, the minesweeper was paid off at Halifax on 6 October 1945 and laid up at Shelburne, Nova Scotia. Kenora was taken to Sorel, Quebec and placed in strategic reserve in 1946. In 1952 the minesweeper was reacquired by the Royal Canadian Navy during the Korean War and modernized. The vessel was taken to Sydney, Nova Scotia and given the new hull number FSE 191 and re-designated a coastal escort. However, the ship never recommissioned and remained in reserve at Sydney until 29 November 1957 when Kenora was formally transferred to the Turkish Navy. Renamed Bandirma by the Turkish Navy, the vessel remained in service until 1972 when Bandirma was discarded. The vessel was broken up in Turkey in 1972. The ship's registry was deleted in 1980.
