= Western Dry Dock and Shipbuilding Company =

Shipyard on Lake Superior

Coordinates: 48°27′11″N 89°10′45″W

- Industry: Shipbuilding
- Founded: 1909
- Founder: James Whalen
- Defunct: 2014
- Headquarters: Port Arthur, Ontario
- Area served: Canada
- Products: Cargo and Passenger ships, Naval vessels

The Western Dry Dock and Shipbuilding Company was a shipyard that operated at Port Arthur, Ontario, now part of Thunder Bay, on Lake Superior from 1911 to 1993. The shipyard was established in 1909 and renamed in 1916 as the Port Arthur Shipbuilding Company. The yard closed in 1993. It reopened as a repair yard Lakehead Marine and Industrial, however that venture failed in 2014. As of 2016, the shipyard was purchased by Heddle Marine. It is operated by Heddle Marine in partnership with Fabmar Metals Inc, of Thunder Bay. The venture focuses on ship repair services and winter layup options.

Its dry dock and shops were constructed in 1910 and located at Bare Point at the extreme eastern end of the Thunder Bay harbour. The company built and repaired many ships during its years of operation, including warships during the First and Second World Wars.

== History ==
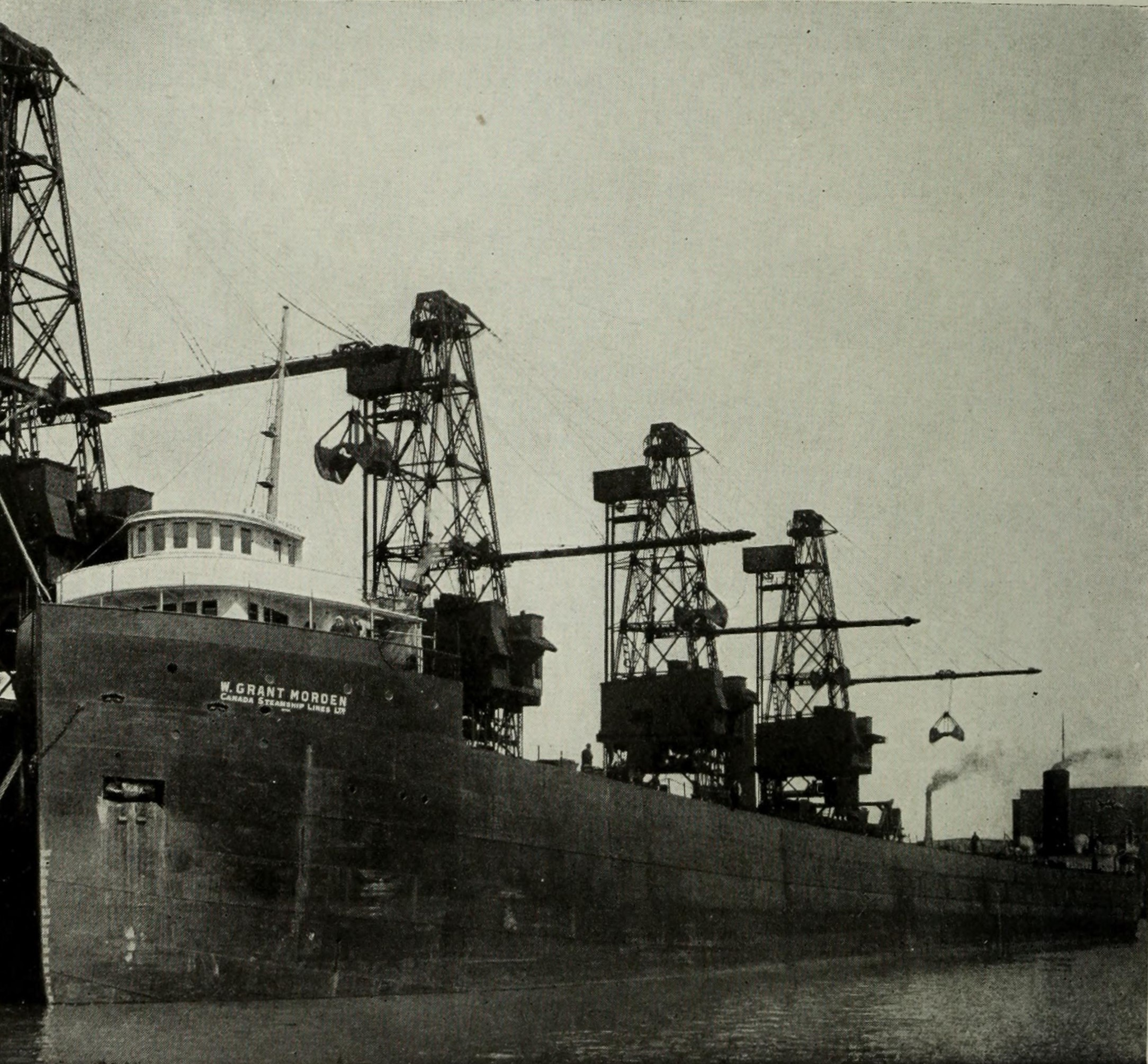
W. Grant Morden, first Canadian ship to hold the title "Queen of the Lakes", largest freighter on the Great Lakes

=== Beginning ===
Entrepreneur James Whalen began the company in 1909. Letters patent issued at Port Arthur in February 1909 and construction began in 1910 after negotiations with The American Ship Building Company, which supplied top management and skilled workmen. The initial cost CAD$650,000. The officers at the time were James Whalen, President from 1910 to 1924; Irving S. Fenn from the American Ship Building Company, Secretary-Treasurer; and Hugh Simms, Superintendent.

The first ship to enter the dry dock was Dunelm, a cargo vessel that docked on 16 April 1911. The first passenger vessel was Hamonte, which docked on 29 July 1911. 1914 marked the launching of W. Grant Morden, later known as Donnacona, a 625-foot (191 m) vessel that was completely built at Western Dry Dock. W. Grant Morden was the largest Canadian-built freighter on the Great Lakes for 20 years. 1914 also marked the construction and launch of SS Sicamous and SS Naramata, two steamships that operated on Okanagan Lake, British Columbia.

=== Early 1900s ===
The company built many ships over next years, including warships for the First World War. In 1916, it was acquired by John Burnham of Chicago, who changed the name to Port Arthur Shipbuilding Company Limited. During the recession of the 1920s, production and employment dropped. The company was taken over by H.B. Smith and R.M. Wolvin ten years later, and business boomed during the Second World War.

=== Second World War ===
Port Arthur Shipbuilding Company constructed and delivered many ships and parts for the war. These included nine corvettes, six Bangor-class minesweepers 20 Algerine-class minesweepers, boilers and engines, and many aircraft components. Increasing business led to new buildings and equipment. The number of employees reached a peak in the July 1944 at 2150 employees (the average was 310).

=== Decline and end ===
The company was acquired by Canada Steamship Lines Limited in 1946. It continued to build ships, including three coasters, two of which were delivered to Chinese government, and six hopper barges for the French government. Major constructions ceased after 1959, though the company continued to repair and renovate ships. The company became a subsidiary of Canadian Shipbuilding and Engineering Limited in 1987 and closed in 1993. It reopened as a repair yard called Lakehead Marine and Industrial Inc., which continued to operate until 2014. Lakehead Marine and Industrial announced its bankruptcy and sold off its assets at auction in November 2014.

=== Purchase and re-development ===
Heddle Marine purchased the property in 2016 and operates as a ship repair and winter layup facility.

== Grounds and facilities ==
The dry dock is 747 feet (228 m) long and 98 feet (30 m) wide (Seawaymax capacity). There is usually 16 feet (4.9 m) of water over the sill of the dry dock, depending on the level of Lake Superior. The dock is pumped by two 200 horsepower (150 kW) direct current pumps that can empty the dock in four hours, discharging 1,000,000 gallons per hour.

The company had modern shops for mill work, pulp and paper machinery, general machine shop work, structural steel, power and heating, boilers and tanks, iron, and brass and aluminum castings. At the time of its construction, the machine shop contained the largest vertical boring mill between Toronto, Ontario and Vancouver, British Columbia. The plant covered 35 acres and was located at the north of Lakehead Harbour. There were 76 buildings with a roofed area of 300,000 square feet (28,000 m^{2}).

== Ships built ==
- Hamiltonian (steel package freighter, 1912)
- Calgarian (package freighter, 1913)
- Noronic (passenger steamer, 1913)
- Nasookin (passenger steamer, 1913)
- Sicamous (passenger steamer, 1914)
- Naramata (tugboat, 1914)
- W. Grant Morden (lake bulk carrier, 1914)
- Blaamyra (ocean freighter, 1916)
- Thorjerd (ocean freighter, 1916)

== Warships built ==
=== Flower-class corvette ===
Ship	Pennant number	Laid down	Launched	Commissioned	Fate
HMCS Algoma	K127	18 June 1940	17 December 1940	11 July 1941	Transferred in 1945 to Venezuela as Constitucion.
HMCS Cobalt	K124	1 April 1940	17 August 1940	25 November 1940	In the Netherlands 1953 as whale catcher Johanna W. Vinke (AM5²) in service. Scrapped 15 December 1961 in South Africa.
HMCS Kamsack	K171	20 November 1940	5 May 1941	4 October 1941	Sold in 1945 to Venezuela as Carabobo. Lost in December 1945.
HMCS Kenogami	K125	20 April 1940	5 September 1940	29 June 1941	Scrapped in January 1950 in Canada.
HMCS Morden	K170	25 October 1940	5 May 1941	6 September 1941	Scrapped in November 1946 in Canada.
HMCS Oakville	K178	21 December 1940	21 June 1941	18 November 1941	Sold in 1946 to Venezuela as Patria.
HMCS Rosthern	K169	18 June 1940	30 November 1940	17 June 1941	Scrapped in June 1946 in Canada.
HMCS Weyburn	K173	21 December 1940	26 July 1941	26 November 1941	Mined on 22 February 1943 off Cape Espartel at 36-46N, 06-02W. 7 crew were killed.
HMCS Port Arthur	K233	28 April 1941	18 September 1941	26 May 1942	Sold on 23 October 1945. Scrapped in 1948 at Hamilton, Ontario.

=== Bangor-class minesweeper ===
Ship	Pennant number	Laid down	Launched	Commissioned	Fate
HMCS Blairmore	J314	1 February 1942	14 May 1942	17 November 1942	Decommissioned on 16 October 1945. Recommissioned in 1949 with pennant J193. Sold to Turkey in 1958 as Beycoz in 1971.
HMCS Fort William	J311	18 August 1941	30 December 1941	25 August 1942	Sold in 1957 to Turkey as Bodrum. Sold in 1971.
HMCS Kenora	J281	18 August 1941	20 December 1941	6 August 1942	Decommissioned on 6 October 1945. Recommissioned in 1949 with pennant J191. Decommissioned in 1957 and sold to Turkey as Bandirma. Sold in 1972.
HMCS Kentville	J312	15 December 1941	17 April 1942	10 October 1942	Decommissioned on 28 October 1945. Recommissioned in 1949 with pennant J182. Decommissioned in 1957 and sold to Turkey as Bartin. Sold in 1972.
HMCS Milltown	J317	18 August 1941	27 January 1942	18 September 1942	Decommissioned on 18 October 1945. Recommissioned in 1949 with pennant J194. Sold in February 1959.
HMCS Mulgrave	J313	15 December 1941	2 May 1942	4 November 1942	Struck a mine in the English Channel off Le Havre on 8 October 1944 and badly damaged, not repaired. Scrapped in May 1947.

=== Algerine-class minesweeper (Royal Canadian Navy) ===
Ship	Pennant number	Laid down	Launched	Commissioned	Fate
HMCS Border Cities	J344	26 August 1942	3 May 1943	18 May 1944	Sold for scrapping 1948
HMCS Fort Frances	J396	11 May 1943	30 October 1943	28 October 1944	Transferred to Department of Mines and Technical Surveys in 1948 Broken up in 1974
HMCS Kapuskasing	J236	19 December 1942	22 July 1943	17 August 1944	Loaned to the Department of Mines and Technical Surveys from 1949-1972 Sunk as a target in 1978
HMCS Middlesex	J328	29 September 1942	27 May 1943	6 August 1944	Ran aground near Halifax and became a total loss on 2 December 1946
HMCS New Liskeard	J397	7 August 1942	14 January 1944	21 November 1944	Scrapped in 1969
HMCS Oshawa	J330	6 October 1942	6 October 1943	6 July 1944	Sold as civilian survey vessel in 1958 Broken up in 1966
HMCS Portage	J331	23 May 1942	21 November 1942	22 October 1943	Broken up in 1961
HMCS Rockcliffe	J335	23 December 1942	19 August 1943	30 September 1944	Broken up in 1960
HMCS Sault Ste. Marie	J334	27 January 1942	5 August 1942	24 June 1943	Broken up in 1960
HMCS St. Boniface	J332	21 May 1942	5 November 1942	9 October 1943	Sold mercantile as Bess Barry M. in 1948
HMCS Wallaceburg	J336	6 July 1942	17 December 1942	18 November 1943	Sold to the Belgian Navy as Georges Lecointe in 1959 Broken up in 1970
HMCS Winnipeg	J337	31 January 1942	19 September 1942	29 July 1943	Sold to the Belgian Navy as A.F. Dufour in 1959 Broken up in 1966

=== Algerine-class minesweeper (Royal Navy) ===
Ship	Pennant number	Commissioned	Fate
HMS Lysander	J379	1943	Broken up in 1957.
HMS Mariner	J380	1944	Sold to the Burmese Navy as Yan Myo Aung in 1958. Withdrawn and Laid up in 1982.
HMS Marmion	J831	1944	Broken up in 1959.
HMS Orcadia	J462	1945	Broken up in 1958.
HMS Ossory	J463	1945	Broken up in 1959.
HMS Pluto	J446	1945	Broken up in 1973.
HMS Polaris	J447	1945	Broken up in 1956.
HMS Pyrrhus	J448	1945	Broken up in 1956.
HMS Romola	J449	1945	Broken up in 1957.
HMS Rosamund	J439	1945	Sold to the South African Navy as HMSAS Bloemfontein in 1947. Sunk as a target off Simonstown on 5 June 1967.

=== Bay-class minesweeper ===
Ship	Hull classification symbol	Laid down	Launched	Commissioned	Fate
HMCS Chaleur	MCB 144	8 June 1951	21 June 1952	18 June 1954	Sold to the French Navy as La Dieppoise in 1954, stricken 1985.
HMCS Quinte	MCB 149	14 June 1952	8 August 1953	15 October 1954	Paid off in 1964.
HMCS Thunder	MCB 161	1 September 1955	27 October 1956	3 March 1957	Paid off in 1997.
