= HMCS Port Arthur =

Flower-class corvette

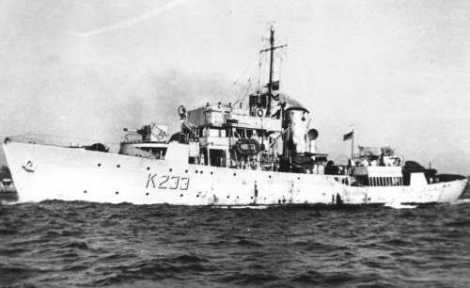
- HMCS Port Arthur

History

Canada
- Name: Port Arthur
- Namesake: Port Arthur, Ontario
- Builder: Port Arthur Shipbuilding Co., Port Arthur
- Laid down: 28 April 1941
- Launched: 18 September 1941
- Commissioned: 26 May 1942
- Decommissioned: 11 July 1945
- Identification: Pennant number: K233
- Honours and awards: Atlantic 1942-1944, Normandy 1944, English Channel 1945; Gulf of St. Lawrence
- Fate: Scrapped 1948 at Hamilton

General characteristics
- Class & type: Flower-class corvette (revised)
- Displacement: 925 long tons (940 t; 1,036 short tons)
- Length: 205 ft (62.48 m)o/a
- Beam: 33 ft (10.06 m)
- Draught: 11.5 ft (3.51 m)
- Propulsion: Single shaft; 2 × water-tube boilers; 1 × double-acting triple-expansion reciprocating steam engine; 2,750 ihp (2,050 kW)
- Speed: 16 knots (29.6 km/h)
- Range: 3,500 nautical miles (6,482 km) at 12 knots (22.2 km/h)
- Complement: 85
- Sensors & processing systems: 1 × SW1C or 2C radar; 1 × Type 123A or Type 127DV sonar
- Armament: 1 × BL 4 in (102 mm) Mk.IX gun; 2 × twin .50 cal machine gun; 2 × Lewis .303 cal machine gun (twin); 2 × Mk.II depth charge throwers; 2 × depth charge rails with 40 depth charges

HMCS Port Arthur was a Royal Canadian Navy revised Flower-class corvette which took part in convoy escort duties during the Second World War. She fought primarily in the Battle of the Atlantic. She was named for Port Arthur, Ontario.

== Background ==
Flower-class corvettes like Port Arthur serving with the Royal Canadian Navy during the Second World War were different from earlier and more traditional sail-driven corvettes. The "corvette" designation was created by the French as a class of small warships; the Royal Navy borrowed the term for a period but discontinued its use in 1877. During the hurried preparations for war in the late 1930s, Winston Churchill reactivated the corvette class, needing a name for smaller ships used in an escort capacity, in this case based on a whaling ship design. The generic name "flower" was used to designate the class of these ships, which – in the Royal Navy – were named after flowering plants.

Corvettes commissioned by the Royal Canadian Navy during the Second World War were named after communities for the most part, to better represent the people who took part in building them. This idea was put forth by Admiral Percy W. Nelles. Sponsors were commonly associated with the community for which the ship was named. Royal Navy corvettes were designed as open sea escorts, while Canadian corvettes were developed for coastal auxiliary roles, exemplified by their minesweeping gear. Eventually the Canadian corvettes would be modified to allow them to perform better on the open seas.

== Construction ==
Port Arthur was ordered as part of the Revised 1940-41 Flower-class building program. This revised program changed the look of the Flower-class corvette. The ships of this program kept the water-tube boilers of the initial 1940-41 program, but now they were housed in separate compartments for safety. The fo'c'sle was extended, which allowed more space for berths for the crew, leading to an expansion of the crew. The bow had increased flare for better control in heavy seas. The revised Flowers of the RCN received an additional two depth charge throwers fitted amidships and more depth charges. They also came with heavier secondary armament with 20 mm anti-aircraft guns carried on the extended bridge wings. All this led to an increase in displacement, draught and length.

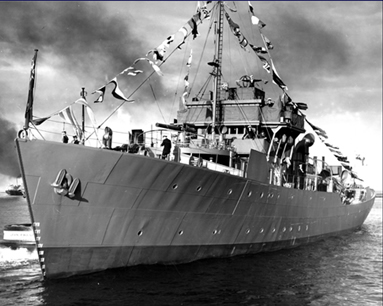
HMCS Port Arthur at commissioning 1942.

Port Arthur was laid down as Fredericton by Port Arthur Shipbuilding Co. at Port Arthur, Ontario, on 28 April 1941 and launched on 18 September of that year. She was commissioned into the RCN on 28 April 1942 at Montreal, Quebec. During her career, Port Arthur had two refits. The first took place at Liverpool, Nova Scotia, from August to 31 December 1943. The second major overhaul took from March until June 1945 at Liverpool again.

== Service history ==
After arriving at Halifax 10 June 1942, Port Arthur was initially assigned to the Western Local Escort Force (WLEF) at the end of July. In September 1942 she was reassigned as part of the Canadian contingent for Operation Torch, the Allied invasion of North Africa. She arrived in the United Kingdom in November 1942 and spent the next four months escorting convoys to and from Gibraltar. On 19 January 1943 HMS Antelope and Port Arthur sank the Italian submarine Tritone near Bougie, Algeria.

Port Arthur returned to Canada at the end of March 1943 and joined the Western Support Force operating out of St. John's. In August she departed for a refit which was completed in December. After resuming service she returned to WLEF as part of escort group W-9. She remained with the group until April 1944.

In April 1944, Port Arthur was assigned to Western Approaches Command for invasion duties as part of Operation Neptune, the naval component of the invasion of Normandy. In September 1944, she transferred to Portsmouth Command as a local escort, protecting coastal convoys. She returned to Canada in February 1945 to begin a refit in March. She never returned to active service before the end of the war.

After the cessation of hostilities, Port Arthur was paid off at Sorel, Quebec, 11 July 1945. She was transferred to the War Assets Corporation and sold for disposal 23 October 1945. She was broken up at Hamilton, Ontario, in 1948.
