= HMCS Oshawa =

1943 Royal Canadian Navy minesweeper

History

Canada
- Name: Oshawa
- Namesake: Oshawa
- Builder: Port Arthur Shipbuilding Co., Port Arthur
- Laid down: 6 October 1942
- Launched: 6 October 1943
- Commissioned: 6 July 1944
- Decommissioned: July 1945
- Identification: J 330
- Recommissioned: 24 October 1945
- Decommissioned: 26 February 1946
- Recommissioned: 11 April 1956
- Decommissioned: 7 November 1958
- Identification: 174
- Motto: In omnia paratus ("Ready for all things")
- Honours and awards: Atlantic, 1944–1945
- Fate: Scrapped 1966
- Badge: Azure, three fish interlaced, or

General characteristics
- Class & type: Algerine-class minesweeper
- Displacement: 1,030 long tons (1,047 t) (standard); 1,325 long tons (1,346 t) (deep)
- Length: 225 ft (69 m) o/a
- Beam: 35 ft 6 in (10.82 m)
- Draught: 12.25 ft 6 in (3.89 m)
- Installed power: 2 × Admiralty 3-drum boilers; 2,400 ihp (1,800 kW)
- Propulsion: 2 shafts; 2 vertical triple-expansion steam engines
- Speed: 16.5 knots (30.6 km/h; 19.0 mph)
- Range: 5,000 nmi (9,300 km; 5,800 mi) at 10 knots (19 km/h; 12 mph)
- Complement: 85
- Armament: 1 × QF 4 in (102 mm) Mk V anti-aircraft gun; 4 × twin Oerlikon 20 mm cannon; 1 × Hedgehog

HMCS Oshawa was a reciprocating engine-powered Algerine-class minesweeper built for the Royal Canadian Navy during the Second World War. Following the war, the ship was converted to an oceanographic research vessel and remained in this capacity until being scrapped in 1966.

== Design and description ==
The reciprocating group displaced 1,010–1,030 long tons (1,030–1,050 t) at standard load and 1,305–1,325 long tons (1,326–1,346 t) at deep load The ships measured 225 feet (68.6 m) long overall with a beam of 35 feet 6 inches (10.8 m). They had a draught of 12 feet 3 inches (3.7 m). The ships' complement consisted of 85 officers and ratings.

The reciprocating ships had two vertical triple-expansion steam engines, each driving one shaft, using steam provided by two Admiralty three-drum boilers. The engines produced a total of 2,400 indicated horsepower (1,800 kW) and gave a maximum speed of 16.5 knots (30.6 km/h; 19.0 mph). They carried a maximum of 660 long tons (671 t) of fuel oil that gave them a range of 5,000 nautical miles (9,300 km; 5,800 mi) at 10 knots (19 km/h; 12 mph).

The Algerine class was armed with a QF 4 in (102 mm) Mk V anti-aircraft gun and four twin-gun mounts for Oerlikon 20 mm cannon. The latter guns were in short supply when the first ships were being completed and they often got a proportion of single mounts. By 1944, single-barrel Bofors 40 mm mounts began replacing the twin 20 mm mounts on a one for one basis. All of the ships were fitted for four throwers and two rails for depth charges. Many Canadian ships omitted their sweeping gear in exchange for a 24-barrel Hedgehog spigot mortar and a stowage capacity for 90+ depth charges.

== Construction and career ==
Oshawa was laid down on 6 October 1942 by Port Arthur Shipbuilding Co. Ltd at Port Arthur, Ontario. Named for the city of Oshawa, Ontario, the ship was launched on 10 June 1943 and commissioned into the Royal Canadian Navy on 6 July 1944 at Port Arthur.

Following her commissioning, the minesweeper sailed up the St. Lawrence River to Halifax, Nova Scotia. Oshawa was then sent to Bermuda to perform her work ups in September 1944. Upon her return, the ship was assigned to the Western Escort Force for convoy escort duties in the Battle of the Atlantic. Oshawa was made Senior Officer Ship of escort group W-6. As Senior Officer Ship, the commander of the escort would be aboard her during convoy missions. She remained with the group until it was disbanded in June 1945. As part of escort group W-6, Oshawa aided in the capture of the German Type IX submarine U-889 on 12 May 175 miles (282 km) southeast off the coast of Cape Race, Newfoundland.

Following the group's disbandment, Oshawa was paid off and placed in reserve at Sydney, Nova Scotia. She was recommissioned on 24 October 1945 and transferred to the west coast, where the minesweeper was paid off into reserve again on 26 February 1946. She was recommissioned for the last time on 11 April 1956 after having been converted for oceanographic research and wore pennant 174 until paid off on 7 November 1958.

After her disposal by the Royal Canadian Navy, Oshawa continued as a civilian oceanographic research vessel. She remained in that role until the ship was sold and scrapped at Victoria, British Columbia in 1966.

== See also ==
- List of ships of the Canadian Navy

== Bibliography ==
- Arbuckle, J. Graeme (1987). Badges of the Canadian Navy. Halifax, Nova Scotia: Nimbus Publishing. ISBN 0-920852-49-1.
- Burn, Alan (1999). The Fighting Commodores: The Convoy Commanders in the Second World War. London: Leo Cooper. ISBN 9780850525045.
- Chesneau, Roger, ed. (1980). Conway's All the World's Fighting Ships 1922–1946. Greenwich, UK: Conway Maritime Press. ISBN 0-85177-146-7.
- Colledge, J. J.; Warlow, Ben (2006) [1969]. Ships of the Royal Navy: The Complete Record of All Fighting Ships of the Royal Navy from the 15th Century to the Present (3rd Rev ed.). London: Chatham Publishing. ISBN 978-1-86176-281-8. OCLC 67375475.
- Hadley, Michael L. (1985). U-Boats Against Canada: German Submarines in Canadian Waters. Montreal, Quebec and Kingston, Ontario: McGill-Queen's University Press. ISBN 0-7735-0811-2.
- Lenton, H. T. (1998). British & Empire Warships of the Second World War. Annapolis, Maryland: Naval Institute Press. ISBN 1-55750-048-7.
- Macpherson, Ken; Barrie, Ron (2002). The Ships of Canada's Naval Forces 1910–2002 (3 ed.). St. Catharines, Ontario: Vanwell Publishing. ISBN 1-55125-072-1.
