= HMCS Milltown =

1942 Royal Canadian Navy minesweeper

History

Canada
- Name: Milltown
- Namesake: Milltown, Ontario
- Builder: Port Arthur Shipbuilding Co., Port Arthur
- Laid down: 18 August 1941
- Launched: 27 January 1942
- Commissioned: 18 September 1942
- Decommissioned: 16 October 1945
- Identification: Pennant number: J317
- Honours and awards: Gulf of St. Lawrence 1942, Normandy 1944
- Fate: Sold for scrap 1959

General characteristics
- Class & type: Bangor-class minesweeper
- Displacement: 672 long tons (683 t)
- Length: 180 ft (54.9 m) oa
- Beam: 28 ft 6 in (8.7 m)
- Draught: 9 ft 9 in (3.0 m)
- Propulsion: 2 Admiralty 3-drum water tube boilers, 2 shafts, vertical triple-expansion reciprocating engines, 2,400 ihp (1,790 kW)
- Speed: 16.5 knots (31 km/h)
- Complement: 83
- Armament: 1 × 12-pounder (3 in (76 mm)) 12 cwt HA gun; 1 x QF 2 pdr Mark VIII; 2 × QF 20 mm Oerlikon guns; 40 depth charges as escort

HMCS Milltown (pennant J317) was a Bangor-class minesweeper that served with the Royal Canadian Navy during the Second World War. The vessel entered service in 1942 and took part in the Battle of the Atlantic, Battle of the St. Lawrence and the invasion of Normandy. Milltown was laid up following the war, but reacquired in 1952 during the Korean War. The ship never re-entered service with the Royal Canadian Navy and was sold for scrap in 1959.

== Design and description ==
A British design, the Bangor-class minesweepers were smaller than the preceding Halcyon-class minesweepers in British service, but larger than the Fundy class in Canadian service. They came in two versions powered by different engines; those with a diesel engines and those with vertical triple-expansion steam engines. Milltown was of the latter design and was larger than her diesel-engined cousins. The minesweeper was 180 feet (54.9 m) long overall, had a beam of 28 feet 6 inches (8.7 m) and a draught of 9 feet 9 inches (3.0 m). Milltown had a displacement of 672 long tons (683 t). She had a complement of 6 officers and 77 enlisted.

Milltown had two vertical triple-expansion steam engines, each driving one shaft, using steam provided by two Admiralty three-drum boilers. The engines produced a total of 2,400 indicated horsepower (1,800 kW) and gave a maximum speed of 16.5 knots (30.6 km/h; 19.0 mph). The minesweeper could carry a maximum of 150 long tons (152 t) of fuel oil.

Milltown was armed with a single quick-firing (QF) 12-pounder (3 in (76 mm)) 12 cwt HA gun mounted forward. (Note: "Cwt" is the abbreviation for hundredweight, 20 cwt referring to the weight of the gun.) The ship was also fitted with a QF 2-pounder Mark VIII aft and were eventually fitted with single-mounted QF 20 mm Oerlikon guns on the bridge wings. The 2-pounder gun was later replaced with a twin 20 mm Oerlikon mount. Those ships assigned to convoy duty had two depth charge launchers and four chutes to deploy the 40 depth charges they carried.

== Operational history ==
The minesweeper was ordered as part of the 1941–1942 construction programme. The ship's keel was laid down on 18 August 1941 by Port Arthur Shipbuilding Co at their yard in Port Arthur, Ontario. Named for a community in Ontario, Milltown was launched on 27 January 1942. The ship was commissioned on 18 September 1942 at Port Arthur.

After arriving at Halifax, Nova Scotia on 27 October 1942, the vessel was assigned to Halifax Force, the local patrol and escort force operating from the city in December. Milltown transferred to the Western Local Escort Force in March 1943 as a convoy escort in the Battle of the Atlantic and served with them for a couple of months. In June, the minesweeper transferred to Gaspé Force, the group tasked with escorting convoys through the Gulf of St. Lawrence and the Saint Lawrence River in the Battle of the Saint Lawrence.

In November 1943, Milltown returned to Halifax Force and remained with the unit until February 1944. That month, the ship sailed to Europe as part of Canada's contribution to the invasion of Normandy. Upon arrival in March, Milltown was assigned to the 31st Minesweeping Flotilla. During the invasion, Milltown and her fellow minesweepers swept and marked channels through the German minefields leading into the invasion beaches in the American sector. The 31st Minesweeping Flotilla swept channel 3 on 6 June. The Canadian Bangors spent most of June sweeping Channel 14, the widened area that combined assault channels 1 to 4.

The minesweepers spent the following months clearing the shipping lanes between the United Kingdom and mainland Europe. Towards the end of 1944, the minesweepers were also being used as a cross channel convoy escorts. Milltown returned to Canada in March 1945 to undergo a refit at Saint John, New Brunswick. The refit was completed in June and the ship returned to European waters and remained there until 21 September.

The ship returned to Canada and on 16 October 1945, Milltown was paid off at Sydney, Nova Scotia and laid up at Shelburne, Nova Scotia. In 1946, the minesweeper was taken to Sorel, Quebec and placed in strategic reserve. Reacquired in 1952 by the Royal Canadian Navy during the height of the Korean War, the vessel was taken to Sydney and given the new hull number FSE 194 and re-designated a coastal escort. However, the ship never re-entered service with the Royal Canadian Navy and remained at Sydney until 1959. Milltown was sold to Marine Industries in February 1959 and broken up for scrap at Sorel.
