= HMCS Winnipeg (J337) =

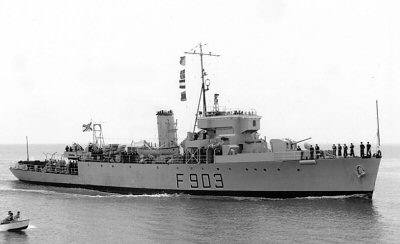
- As Belgian Navy A.F. Dufour

History

Canada
- Name: Winnipeg
- Namesake: Winnipeg, Manitoba
- Ordered: 12 December 1941
- Builder: Port Arthur Shipbuilding Co. Ltd.
- Laid down: 31 January 1942
- Launched: 19 September 1942
- Commissioned: 29 July 1943
- Decommissioned: 1 November 1946
- Identification: Pennant number: J337
- Honours and awards: Atlantic 1943–45
- Fate: Transferred to Belgium 1959
- Badge: Azure, a bison head passant, or

Belgium
- Name: A.F. Dufour
- Operator: Belgian Navy
- Acquired: 7 August 1959
- Stricken: 1966
- Identification: F903
- Fate: Broken up for scrap 1966

General characteristics
- Class & type: Algerine-class minesweeper
- Displacement: 1,030 long tons (1,047 t) (standard); 1,325 long tons (1,346 t) (deep)
- Length: 225 ft (69 m) o/a
- Beam: 35 ft 6 in (10.82 m)
- Draught: 12.25 ft 6 in (3.89 m)
- Installed power: 2 × Admiralty 3-drum boilers; 2,400 ihp (1,800 kW)
- Propulsion: 2 shafts; 2 vertical triple-expansion steam engines
- Speed: 16.5 knots (30.6 km/h; 19.0 mph)
- Range: 5,000 nmi (9,300 km; 5,800 mi) at 10 knots (19 km/h; 12 mph)
- Complement: 85
- Armament: 1 × QF 4 in (102 mm) Mk V anti-aircraft gun; 4 × twin Oerlikon 20 mm cannon; 1 × Hedgehog

HMCS Winnipeg was an Algerine-class minesweeper that served in the Royal Canadian Navy during the Second World War. Used primarily as a convoy escort, the vessel served in the Battle of the Atlantic. Following the war she placed in reserve before being sold to Belgium and renamed A.F. Dufour. She served with the Belgian Navy until 1966.

== Design and description ==
The reciprocating group of the Algerine-class minesweepers displaced 1,010–1,030 long tons (1,030–1,050 t) at standard load and 1,305–1,325 long tons (1,326–1,346 t) at deep load. The ships measured 225 feet (68.6 m) long overall with a beam of 35 feet 6 inches (10.8 m). They had a draught of 12 feet 3 inches (3.7 m). The ships' complement consisted of 85 officers and ratings.

The reciprocating ships had two vertical triple-expansion steam engines, each driving one shaft, using steam provided by two Admiralty three-drum boilers. The engines produced a total of 2,400 indicated horsepower (1,800 kW) and gave a maximum speed of 16.5 knots (30.6 km/h; 19.0 mph). They carried a maximum of 660 long tons (671 t) of fuel oil that gave them a range of 5,000 nautical miles (9,300 km; 5,800 mi) at 10 knots (19 km/h; 12 mph).

The Algerine class was armed with a QF 4 in (102 mm) Mk V anti-aircraft gun and four twin-gun mounts for Oerlikon 20 mm cannon. The latter guns were in short supply when the first ships were being completed and they often got a proportion of single mounts. By 1944, single-barrel Bofors 40 mm (1.6 in) mounts began replacing the twin 20 mm mounts on a one for one basis. All of the ships were fitted for four throwers and two rails for depth charges. Many Canadian ships omitted their sweeping gear in exchange for a 24-barrel Hedgehog spigot mortar and a stowage capacity for 90+ depth charges.

== Service history ==
=== Royal Canadian Navy ===
Winnipeg was ordered on 12 December 1941. The ship was laid down on 31 January 1942 by Port Arthur Shipbuilding Company Ltd. at Port Arthur, Ontario and launched 19 September later that year. She was commissioned into the Royal Canadian Navy on 29 July 1943 at Port Arthur with the pennant number J 337.

After commissioning, Winnipeg worked up at Pictou before joining the Western Escort Force. The vessel was assigned to the convoy escort group W-7 initially, transferring to W-6 in December 1943. From February to April 1944 the ship acted as the Senior Officer's ship of the escort group. As Senior Officer Ship, the commander of the escort would be aboard her during convoy missions.

Winnipeg joined escort group W-5, becoming that group's Senior Officer's ship upon transfer and remained with that group until it was disbanded in June 1945. The ship was placed in reserve at Sydney for a short period before being reactivated and transferred to Esquimalt, British Columbia. There she was paid off into the reserve on 11 January 1946.

=== Belgian Navy ===
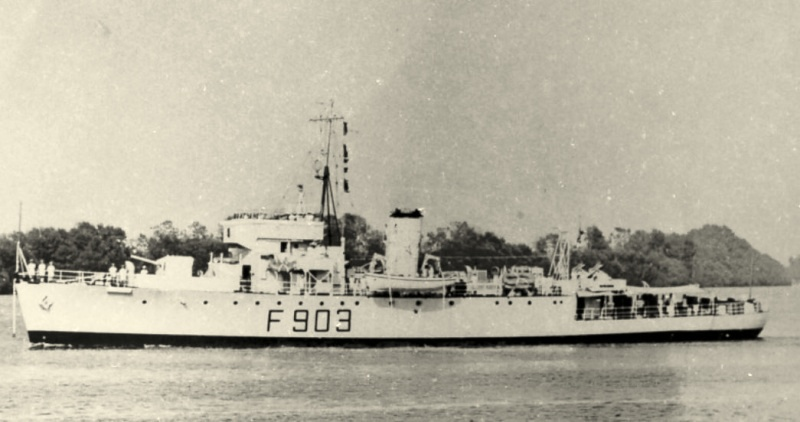
As A.F. Dufour

After lying in reserve for ten years, Winnipeg was brought back to the east coast of Canada in 1956. She was sold to Belgium and entered into service with the Belgian Navy on 7 August 1959 as A.F. Dufour. The ship was reclassified as a coastal escort after entering service. Upon acquisition, the 20 mm anti-aircraft guns were replaced with 40 mm anti-aircraft guns in single mounts. In 1960, the ship took part in Operation Camoens in the Belgian Congo. On 7 November 1966, the ship sold to M. Bakker P.V.B.A and broken up for scrap.

== See also ==
- List of ships of the Canadian Navy
