= HMCS Algoma =

Flower-class corvette

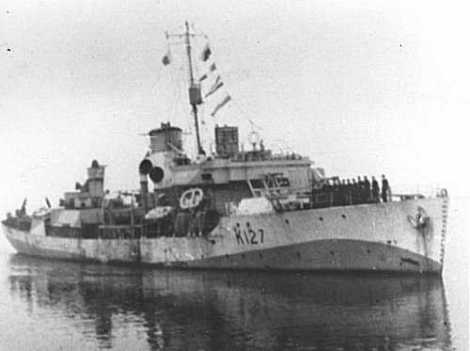
- HMCS Algoma

History

Canada
- Name: Algoma
- Namesake: Algoma District, Ontario
- Ordered: 1 February 1940
- Builder: Port Arthur Shipbuilding Co., Port Arthur
- Laid down: 18 June 1940
- Launched: 17 December 1940
- Commissioned: 11 July 1941
- Decommissioned: 6 July 1945
- Identification: Pennant number: K127
- Honours and awards: Atlantic 1941–44, English Channel 1945
- Fate: Sold to Venezuelan Navy

Venezuela
- Name: Constitución
- Acquired: bought from Royal Canadian Navy
- Commissioned: 1946
- Out of service: 1962
- Fate: Scrapped 1962

General characteristics
- Class & type: Flower-class corvette (original)
- Displacement: 950 long tons (970 t)
- Length: 205 ft 1 in (62.51 m) o/a
- Beam: 33 ft 1 in (10.08 m)
- Draught: 13 ft 5 in (4.09 m)
- Installed power: 2,750 ihp (2,050 kW)
- Propulsion: single shaft; 2 × Scotch boilers; 1 × 4-cylinder triple-expansion engine
- Speed: 16 knots (30 km/h; 18 mph)
- Range: 3,450 nmi (6,390 km; 3,970 mi) at 12 kn (22 km/h; 14 mph)
- Complement: 47
- Sensors & processing systems: 1 × SW1C or 2C radar; 1 × Type 123A or Type 127DV sonar
- Armament: 1 × BL 4 in (102 mm) Mk.IX single gun; 2 × .50 cal machine gun (twin); 2 × Lewis .303 cal machine gun (twin); 2 × Mk II depth charge throwers; 2 × depth charge rails with 40 depth charges; originally fitted with minesweeping gear, later removed

HMCS Algoma was a Flower-class corvette that served with the Royal Canadian Navy in the Second World War. Named for the Algoma District of Ontario, it served primarily in the Battle of the Atlantic. After the war it was sold to the Venezuelan Navy and renamed Constitución.

Designed as a convoy escort, the vessel was laid down on 18 June 1940, launched on 17 December and commissioned on 11 July 1941. The ship took part in three major convoy battles and Operation Torch escort duties and was decommissioned in 1945. She served with the Venezuelan Navy from 1946 until 1962.

== Design and description ==
Flower-class corvettes such as Algoma serving with the Royal Canadian Navy (RCN) in the Second World War were different from earlier and more traditional sail-driven corvettes. The Flower-class corvettes originated from a need that arose in 1938 to expand the Royal Navy following the Munich Crisis. A design request went out for a small escort for coastal convoys. Based on a traditional whaler-type design, the initial Canadian ships of the Flower class had a standard displacement of 950 long tons (970 t). They were 205 feet 1 inch (62.51 m) long overall with a beam of 33 feet 1 inch (10.08 m) and a maximum draught of 13 feet 5 inches (4.09 m). The initial 1939–1940 corvettes were powered by a four-cylinder vertical triple expansion engine powered by steam from two Scotch boilers turning one three-bladed propeller rated at 2,800 indicated horsepower (2,100 kW). The Scotch boilers were replaced with water-tube boilers in later 1939–1940 and 1940–1941 Programme ships. The corvettes had a maximum speed of 16 knots (30 km/h; 18 mph). This gave them a range of 3,450 nautical miles (6,390 km; 3,970 mi) at 12 knots (22 km/h; 14 mph). The vessels were extremely wet.

The Canadian Flower-class vessels were initially armed with a Mk IX BL 4-inch (102 mm) gun forward on a CP 1 mounting and carried 100 rounds per gun. The corvettes were also armed with a QF Vickers 2-pounder (40 mm, 1.6 in) gun on a bandstand aft, two single-mounted .303 Vickers machine guns or Browning 0.5-calibre machine guns for anti-aircraft defence and two twin-mounted .303 Lewis machine guns, usually sited on bridge wings. For anti-submarine warfare, they mounted two depth charge throwers and initially carried 25 depth charges. The corvettes were designed with a Type 123 ASDIC sonar set installed. The Flower-class ships had a complement of 47 officers and ratings. The Royal Canadian Navy initially ordered 54 corvettes in 1940 and these were fitted with Mark II Oropesa minesweeping gear used for destroying contact mines. Part of the depth charge rails were made portable so the minesweeping gear could be utilised.

=== Modifications ===
In Canadian service the vessels were altered due to experience with the design's deficiencies. The galley was moved further back in the ship and the mess and sleeping quarters combined. A wireless direction finding set was installed, and enlarged bilge keels were installed to reduce rolling. After the first 35–40 corvettes had been constructed, the foremast was shifted aft of the bridge and the mainmast was eliminated. Corvettes were first fitted with basic SW-1 and SW-2 CQ surface warning radar, notable for their fishbone-like antenna and reputation for failure in poor weather or in the dark. The compass house was moved further aft and the open-type bridge was situated in front of it. The ASDIC hut was moved in front and to a lower position on the bridge. The improved Type 271 radar was placed aft, with some units receiving Type 291 radar for air search. The minesweeping gear, a feature of the first 54 corvettes, was removed. Most Canadian Flower-class corvettes had their forecastles extended which improved crew accommodation and seakeeping. Furthermore, the sheer and flare of the bow was increased, which led to an enlarged bridge. This allowed for the installation of Oerlikon 20 mm (0.8 in) cannon, replacing the Browning and Vickers machine guns. Some of the corvettes were rearmed with Hedgehog anti-submarine mortars. The complements of the ships grew throughout the war rising from the initial 47 to as many as 104.

== Construction and career ==
=== Canadian service ===
Algoma was ordered 1 February 1940 as part of the 1939–1940 Flower class building program. She was laid down on 18 June 1940 by Port Arthur Shipbuilding Co. in Port Arthur, Ontario, and launched on 17 December 1940. The vessel was commissioned on 11 July 1941 in Montreal, Quebec, and arrived in Halifax, Nova Scotia, on 18 July 1940 to begin her career. In the Battle of the Atlantic, escort ships for convoys of merchant ships were organised into groups, with Algoma initially joining the groups 4.1.12 and 4.1.14 before reorganisation into Mid-Ocean Escort Force (MOEF) Escort Group A3 (EG A3). On 21 February 1942, the convoy ON 67 was located by German U-boats which was being escorted by the convoy escort group A6, of which Algoma was a member of at the time. In the battle from 21–24 February eight ships were sunk. On 11 May, the convoy ONS 92, escorted by A3 was spotted by U-boats. The convoy lost six merchant vessels before contact was lost due to bad weather. Algoma then went in for refit at Liverpool, Nova Scotia in July, which took six weeks to complete. Upon returning to active service, the corvette joined the Western Local Escort Force. She was then assigned to Operation Torch duties in October and left for the United Kingdom with convoy SC 107. On 1 November the convoy was intercepted by the German wolfpack "Hecht" and until the end of the battle on 6 November, 13 merchant ships were sunk.

Algoma was then placed under command of the Royal Navy, escorting convoys to the Mediterranean Sea. In February 1943, the ship was based at Bône, Algeria before returning to Atlantic waters, based at St. John's, Newfoundland. The convoy escorted by Algoma on the return journey, ON 179, suffered no losses even though it was pursued by U-boats. After a brief stint with the Western Support force in May 1943 and a return to WLEF, the corvette joined Quebec Force in June, the unit dedicated to escort and patrol around Quebec until November. Algoma did one quick tour with MOEF group C4 before arriving at Liverpool, Nova Scotia, for a major refit. Algoma returned to service in May 1944, joining MOEF group C5. She performed three round-trips with convoys before joining EG 41 at Plymouth, United Kingdom, under the command of the Royal Navy's Plymouth Command. She spent the rest of the war patrolling the English Channel. For service in the war, Algoma was given the battle honours "Atlantic 1941–44" and "English Channel 1945".

=== Venezuelan service ===
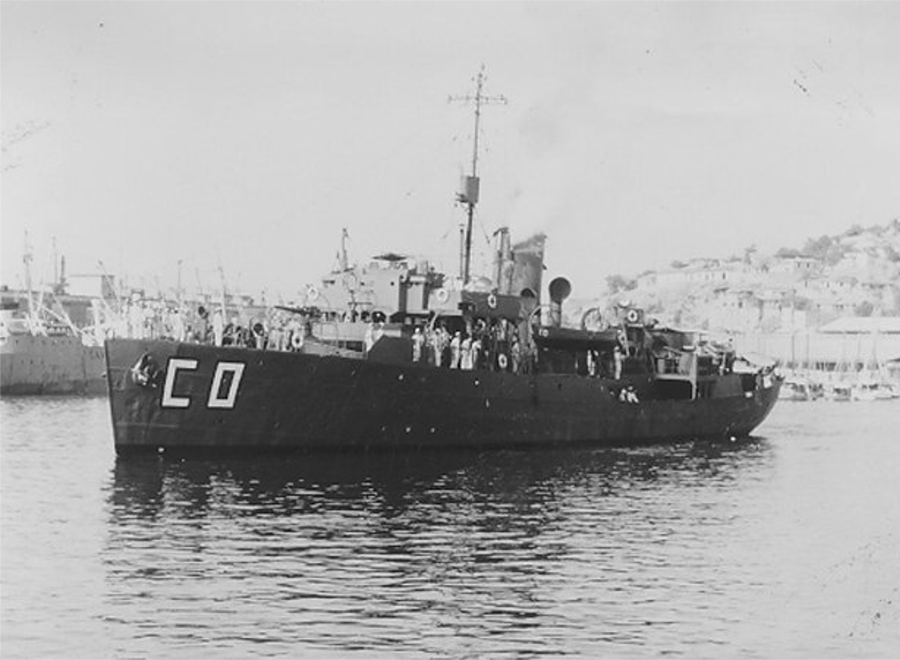
ARV Constitución in 1948

Algoma was paid off on 6 July 1945 at Sydney, Nova Scotia, for disposal. The Venezuelan Navy bought her in 1945 and renamed her ARV Constitución. She was discarded in 1962.
