= HMCS Kamsack =

Flower-class corvette

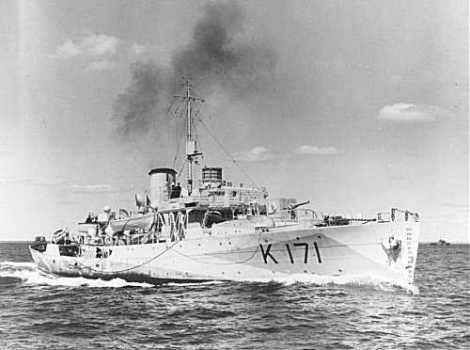
- HMCS Kamsack

History

Canada
- Name: Kamsack
- Namesake: Kamsack, Saskatchewan
- Ordered: 1 February 1940
- Builder: Port Arthur Shipbuilding Co. Port Arthur
- Laid down: 20 November 1940
- Launched: 5 May 1941
- Commissioned: 4 October 1941
- Decommissioned: 22 July 1945
- Identification: Pennant number: K171
- Honours and awards: Atlantic 1942–44
- Fate: Sold to Venezuelan Navy

Venezuela
- Name: Carabobo
- Acquired: purchased from Royal Canadian Navy
- Commissioned: 1945
- Out of service: December 1945
- Fate: Wrecked December 1945

General characteristics
- Class & type: Flower-class corvette
- Displacement: 950 long tons (970 t; 1,060 short tons)
- Length: 205 ft (62.48 m)
- Beam: 33 ft (10.06 m)
- Draught: 11.5 ft (3.51 m)
- Propulsion: Single shaft; 2 water tube boilers; 1 4-cyl. triple expansion steam engine, 2,750 hp (2,050 kW)
- Speed: 16 knots (29.6 km/h)
- Range: 3,450 nmi (6,390 km; 3,970 mi) at 12 kn (22 km/h; 14 mph)
- Complement: 6 officers, 79 men
- Sensors & processing systems: Radar – SW1C or 2C (later); Sonar – Type 123A, later Type 127DV
- Armament: 1 × BL 4 in (102 mm) Mk.IX single gun; 2 × .50 cal machine gun twin; 2 × Lewis .303 cal mg twin; 2 × Mk.II depth charge throwers; 2 × depth charge rails with 40 depth charges.; Originally fitted with minesweeping gear, later removed.

HMCS Kamsack was a Flower-class corvette that served with the Royal Canadian Navy during the Second World War. She served primarily in the Battle of the Atlantic as an ocean escort. She was named for Kamsack, Saskatchewan.

== Background ==
Flower-class corvettes like Kamsack serving with the Royal Canadian Navy during the Second World War were different from earlier and more traditional sail-driven corvettes. The "corvette" designation was created by the French as a class of small warships; the Royal Navy borrowed the term for a period but discontinued its use in 1877. During the hurried preparations for war in the late 1930s, Winston Churchill reactivated the corvette class, needing a name for smaller ships used in an escort capacity, in this case based on a whaling ship design. The generic name "flower" was used to designate the class of these ships, which – in the Royal Navy – were named after flowering plants.

Corvettes commissioned by the Royal Canadian Navy during the Second World War were named after communities for the most part, to better represent the people who took part in building them. This idea was put forth by Admiral Percy W. Nelles. Sponsors were commonly associated with the community for which the ship was named. Royal Navy corvettes were designed as open sea escorts, while Canadian corvettes were developed for coastal auxiliary roles which was exemplified by their minesweeping gear. Eventually the Canadian corvettes would be modified to allow them to perform better on the open seas.

== Construction ==
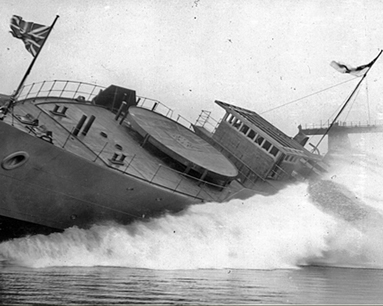
The launch of Kamsack – 5 May 1941.

Kamsack was ordered on 1 February 1940 as part of the 1939–1940 Flower-class building program. She was laid down 20 November 1940 by Port Arthur Shipbuilding Co. in Port Arthur, Ontario and launched 5 May 1941. Kamsack was commissioned on 4 October 1941 in Quebec and arrived at Halifax on 13 October for workups.

During her career, Kamsack had two major refits. The first refit took place at Liverpool, Nova Scotia beginning on 12 November 1942 and was completed at Halifax 18 January 1943. The second major refit took place in Baltimore, Maryland from December 1943 and took until mid-March 1944 to complete. During this second refit, Kamsack had her fo'c'sle extended.

== Service history ==
=== War service ===
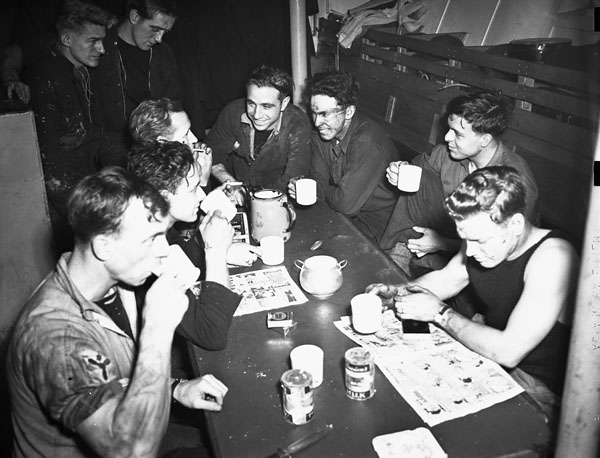
Stand easy in the stoker's mess of Kamsack

After workups, Kamsack initially joined Sydney Force. However, in December 1941, she began her service with the Newfoundland Escort Force as part of escort group N13. In April 1942, Kamsack joined the Mid-Ocean Escort Force (MOEF) for two months as a part of escort group C-3. In June 1942, she transferred to the Western Local Escort Force (WLEF), with whom Kamsack would spend the rest of the war with. As a member of WLEF, in June 1943 she was assigned to escort group W-4 and in April 1944, group W-3.

=== Postwar service ===
Kamsack was paid off on 22 July 1945 at Sorel, Quebec. She was quickly sold to the Venezuelan Navy who purchased her later that year. Renamed ARV Carabobo, she was wrecked during passage to Venezuela in December 1945.
