= HMCS Sault Ste. Marie =

1942 Algerine-class minesweeper

History

Canada
- Name: Sault Ste. Marie
- Builder: Port Arthur Shipbuilding Co. Ltd., Port Arthur
- Laid down: 27 January 1942
- Launched: 5 August 1942
- Commissioned: 24 June 1943
- Decommissioned: 1 December 1946
- Identification: Pennant number J334
- Recommissioned: 7 May 1949
- Decommissioned: 1 October 1958
- Identification: 281
- Honours and awards: Atlantic 1944-45
- Fate: Scrapped, 1960
- Badge: Paly wavy of ten argent and azure, upon which a fleur-de-lis ensigned with a celestial crown or.

General characteristics
- Class & type: Algerine-class minesweeper
- Displacement: 1,030 long tons (1,047 t) (standard); 1,325 long tons (1,346 t) (deep)
- Length: 225 ft (69 m) o/a
- Beam: 35 ft 6 in (10.82 m)
- Draught: 12.25 ft 6 in (3.89 m)
- Installed power: 2 × Admiralty 3-drum boilers; 2,400 ihp (1,800 kW)
- Propulsion: 2 shafts; 2 vertical triple-expansion steam engines
- Speed: 16.5 knots (30.6 km/h; 19.0 mph)
- Range: 5,000 nmi (9,300 km; 5,800 mi) at 10 knots (19 km/h; 12 mph)
- Complement: 85
- Armament: 1 × QF 4 in (102 mm) Mk V anti-aircraft gun; 4 × twin Oerlikon 20 mm cannon; 1 × Hedgehog

HMCS Sault Ste. Marie was a reciprocating engine-powered Algerine-class minesweeper built for the Royal Canadian Navy during the Second World War. Entering service in 1943, the minesweeper was used as a convoy escort in the Battle of the Atlantic. Following the war, the minesweeper saw service as a training vessel before being scrapped in 1960.

== Design and description ==
The reciprocating group displaced 1,010–1,030 long tons (1,030–1,050 t) at standard load and 1,305–1,325 long tons (1,326–1,346 t) at deep load The ships measured 225 feet (68.6 m) long overall with a beam of 35 feet 6 inches (10.8 m). They had a draught of 12 feet 3 inches (3.7 m). The ships' complement consisted of 85 officers and ratings.

The reciprocating ships had two vertical triple-expansion steam engines, each driving one shaft, using steam provided by two Admiralty three-drum boilers. The engines produced a total of 2,400 indicated horsepower (1,800 kW) and gave a maximum speed of 16.5 knots (30.6 km/h; 19.0 mph). They carried a maximum of 660 long tons (671 t) of fuel oil that gave them a range of 5,000 nautical miles (9,300 km; 5,800 mi) at 10 knots (19 km/h; 12 mph).

The Algerine class was armed with a QF 4 in (102 mm) Mk V anti-aircraft gun and four twin-gun mounts for Oerlikon 20 mm cannon. The latter guns were in short supply when the first ships were being completed and they often got a proportion of single mounts. By 1944, single-barrel Bofors 40 mm mounts began replacing the twin 20 mm mounts on a one for one basis. All of the ships were fitted for four throwers and two rails for depth charges. Many Canadian ships omitted their sweeping gear in exchange for a 24-barrel Hedgehog spigot mortar and a stowage capacity for 90+ depth charges.

== Construction and career ==
When ordered, the ship was intended to be named The Soo, but the name was changed after the city she was named for, Sault Ste. Marie, Ontario, objected. The ship was renamed Sault Ste. Marie and was laid down on 27 January 1942 by Port Arthur Shipbuilding Co. Ltd in Port Arthur, Ontario. The ship was launched on 5 August 1942 and commissioned into the Royal Canadian Navy at Port Arthur on 24 June 1943, the first of the Canadian Algerines.

After commissioning the minesweeper sailed up the St. Lawrence River, making her way to Halifax, Nova Scotia. Sault Ste. Marie then proceeded to Bermuda to work up and upon her return, joined the Western Escort Force escort group W-9 for convoy escort duties in the Battle of the Atlantic. The minesweeper took the position of Senior Officer Ship upon joining the group. As Senior Officer Ship, the commander of the escort would be aboard her during convoy missions.

Sault Ste. Marie remained a part of escort group W-9 until mid-April 1945 when she transferred to group W-7, retaining the position of Senior Officer Ship with the new group. W-7 was disbanded in June 1945, after which the minesweeper was placed in reserve at Sydney, Nova Scotia.

After a short period, Sault Ste. Marie was transferred to the West Coast, arriving at Esquimalt, British Columbia on 12 December 1945. A month later on 12 January 1946, the minesweeper was paid off into the reserve again. On 7 May 1949, the ship was recommissioned as a training ship. She was assigned to HMCS Malahat until the end of 1954. In mid-December 1955, she returned to the East Coast, joining the Eleventh Canadian Escort Squadron at Halifax. The minesweeper was used as a training vessel during the summers from 1956 to 1958 on the Great Lakes. On 1 October 1958 Sault Ste. Marie was paid off. She was taken to Sorel where the ship was broken up in 1960.

The 4-inch gun of Sault Ste. Marie can be found outside the Royal Canadian Legion in Sault Ste. Marie.

== Bibliography ==
- Arbuckle, J. Graeme (1987). Badges of the Canadian Navy. Halifax, Nova Scotia: Nimbus Publishing. ISBN 0-920852-49-1.
- Burn, Alan (1999). The Fighting Commodores: The Convoy Commanders in the Second World War. London: Leo Cooper. ISBN 9780850525045.
- Chesneau, Roger, ed. (1980). Conway's All the World's Fighting Ships 1922–1946. Greenwich, UK: Conway Maritime Press. ISBN 0-85177-146-7.
- Colledge, J. J.; Warlow, Ben (2006) [1969]. Ships of the Royal Navy: The Complete Record of All Fighting Ships of the Royal Navy from the 15th Century to the Present (3rd Rev ed.). London: Chatham Publishing. ISBN 978-1-86176-281-8. OCLC 67375475.
- Gimblett, Richard H.; Hadley, Michael L., eds. (2010). Citizen Sailors: Chronicles of Canada's Naval Reserve. Toronto: Dundurn Press. ISBN 978-1-55488-867-2.
- Lenton, H. T. (1998). British & Empire Warships of the Second World War. Annapolis, Maryland: Naval Institute Press. ISBN 1-55750-048-7.
- Macpherson, Ken; Barrie, Ron (2002). The Ships of Canada's Naval Forces 1910-2002 (3 ed.). St. Catharines, Ontario: Vanwell Publishing. ISBN 1-55125-072-1.
- Skaarup, Harold A. (2012). Shelldrake: Canadian Artillery Museums and Gun Monuments. Bloomington, Indiana: Iuniverse Inc. ISBN 978-1-4697-5001-9.
