= James Whalen (businessman) =

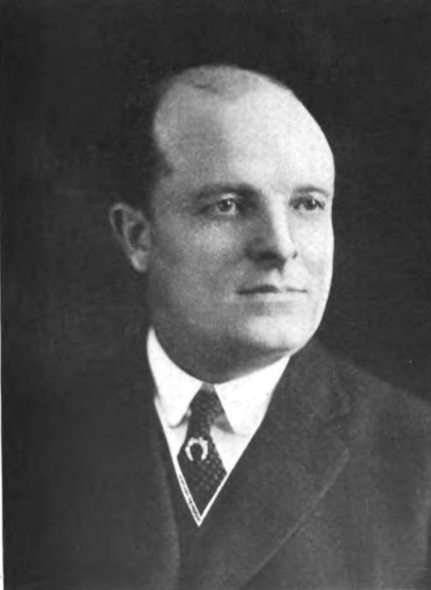
- Born: April 29, 1869; Collingwood, Ontario
- Died: June 4, 1929 (aged 60); Duluth, Minnesota
- Occupation: Businessman
- Spouse: Laurel Conmee (m. 1896)

James Whalen (April 29, 1869 – June 4, 1929) was a Canadian businessperson and entrepreneur based in Port Arthur, Ontario, now part of Thunder Bay, Ontario, with interests in the forest industries, shipbuilding, dredging, and towing. From a modest beginning as a timber contractor in the 1890s, he built an impressive business empire in various Great Lakes marine businesses. With the help of his brothers he was less successful in entering the competitive British Columbia pulp and paper business that went bankrupt in 1925.

== Biography ==
He was born in Collingwood, Ontario, on April 29, 1869, to Joseph Whalen and Alice Broad, and died in Duluth, Minnesota June 4, 1929. His marriage to Laurel Conmee in 1896 allied his fortunes to her father, the formidable Ontario politician and contractor James Conmee.

He constructed the eight storey Whalen building in Port Arthur in 1913.

== Companies associated with James Whalen ==
- Western Dry Dock and Shipbuilding Company
- Port Arthur Shipbuilding Company, PASCO
- Great Lakes Dredging Company
- Canadian Towing and Wrecking Company
- Dominion Towing and Salvage Company
- Whalen Pulp and Paper Company (British Columbia)
- Canada West Coast Navigation Company
- Canada Pebble Company
