= QF 4-inch naval gun Mk V =

Ordnance QF 4 inch gun Mk V
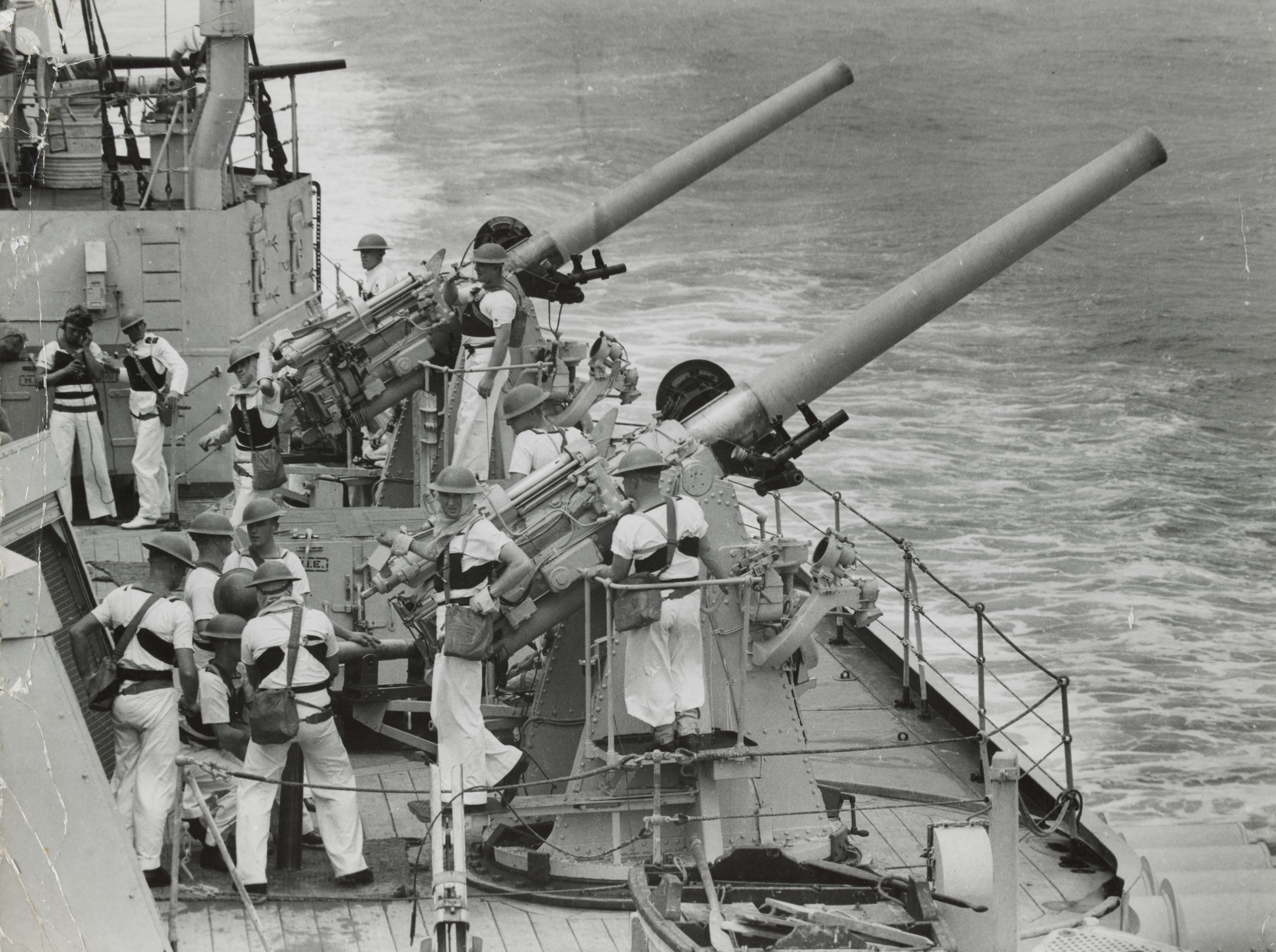
- QF 4 inch HA guns aboard the cruiser HMAS Sydney, 1939–1940
- Type: Naval gun Anti-aircraft gun Coastal defence gun
- Place of origin: United Kingdom

Service history
- In service: 1914–1945
- Used by: British Empire
- Wars: World War I World War II

Production history
- No. built: 944

Specifications
- Mass: Barrel & breech: 4,890 lb (2,220 kg)
- Barrel length: Bore: 15 ft (4.6 m) (45 cal); Total: 15 ft 8 in (4.8 m)
- Shell: 31 lb (14.1 kg) fixed QF or Separate-loading QF
- Calibre: 4-inch (101.6 mm)
- Breech: horizontal sliding-block
- Recoil: hydro-pneumatic or hydro-spring 15 inches (380 mm)
- Elevation: mounting dependent
- Traverse: mounting dependent
- Muzzle velocity: 2,350 ft/s (716 m/s)
- Maximum firing range: Surface: 16,300 yd (15,000 m); AA: 28,750 ft (8,800 m)
- Filling: Lyddite, Amatol
- Filling weight: 5 pounds (2.27 kg)

The QF 4 inch Mk V gun (Note: Mk V = Mark 5. Britain used Roman numerals to denote Marks (models) of ordnance until after World War II. Mark V indicates this was the fifth model of QF 4-inch gun.) was a Royal Navy gun of World War I which was adapted on HA (i.e. high-angle) mountings to the heavy anti-aircraft role both at sea and on land, and was also used as a coast defence gun.

== Service ==
=== Naval service ===
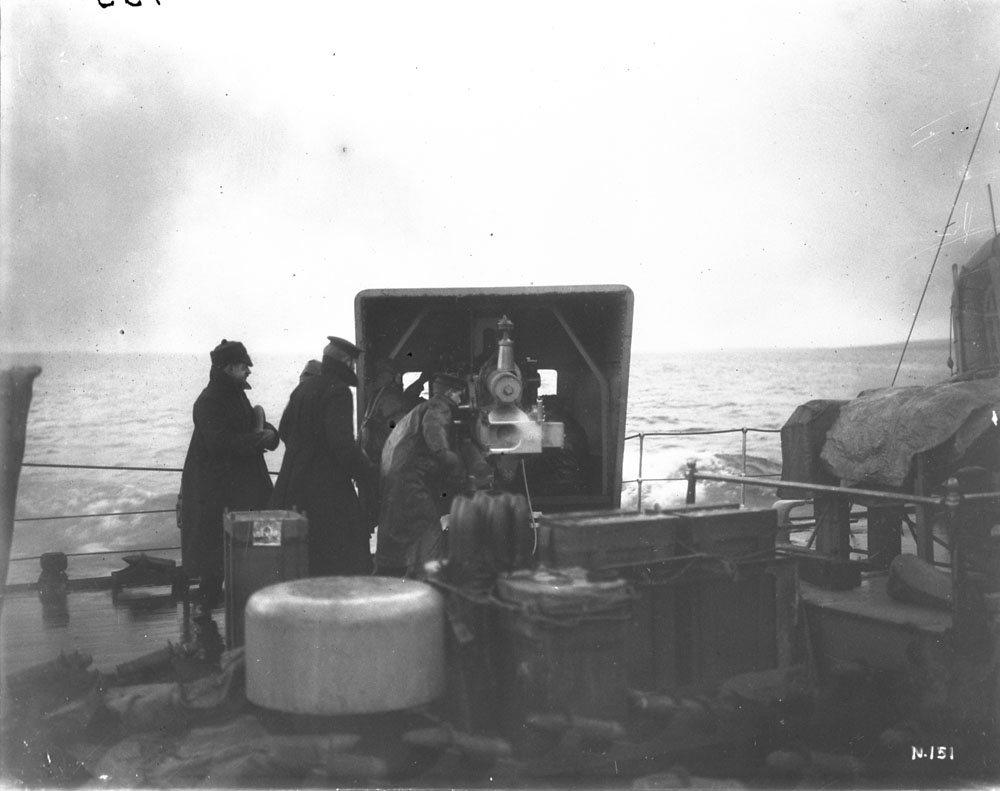
LA (Low Angle) gun and crew on HMS Galatea, February 1917

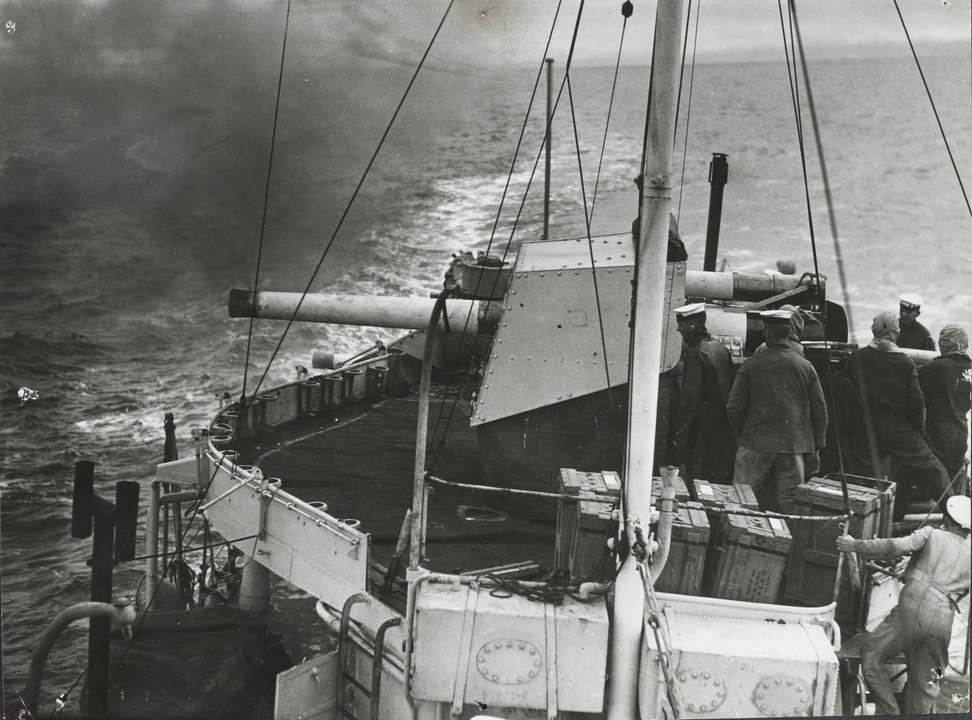
LA (Low Angle) gun on HMAS Vampire firing circa 1938

This QF gun was introduced to provide a higher rate of fire than the BL 4 inch Mk VII. It first appeared in 1914 as secondary armament on Arethusa-class cruisers, was soon adapted to a high-angle anti-aircraft role. It was typically used on cruisers and heavier ships, although V and W-class destroyers of 1917 also mounted the gun.

Mk V was superseded by the QF 4 inch Mk XVI as the HA (i.e. anti-aircraft) gun on new warships in the 1930s, but it continued to serve on many ships such as destroyers, light and heavy cruisers in World War II.

=== Army anti-aircraft gun ===
Early in World War I several guns were supplied by the Navy for evaluation as anti-aircraft guns for the home defence of key installations in Britain. They were mounted on static platforms and proved fairly successful after a fixed round was developed to replace the original separate round, and more followed. The AA mounting allowed elevation to 80° but loading was not possible above 62°, which slowed the maximum rate of fire. At the Armistice, a total of 24 guns were employed in AA defences in Britain and 2 in France. After World War I, the guns were returned to the Navy.

=== Coast Defence gun ===
From 1915 to 1928, several guns were mounted in forts to guard the estuary of the River Humber.

== Anti-aircraft performance ==
Comparison with the other British World War I anti-aircraft guns
Gun	muzzle velocity	Shell (lb)	Time to 5,000 ft (1,500 m) at 25° (seconds)	Time to 10,000 ft (3,000 m) at 40° (seconds)	Time to 15,000 ft (4,600 m) at 55° (seconds)	Max. height
QF 13 pdr 9 cwt	1,990 ft/s (610 m/s)	12.5	10.1	15.5	22.1	19,000 ft (5,800 m)
QF 12 pdr 12 cwt	2,200 ft/s (670 m/s)	12.5	9.1	14.1	19.1	20,000 ft (6,100 m)
QF 3 inch 20 cwt 1914	2,500 ft/s (760 m/s)	12.5	8.3	12.6	16.3	23,500 ft (7,200 m)
QF 3 inch 20 cwt 1916	2,000 ft/s (610 m/s)	16	9.2	13.7	18.8	22,000 ft (6,700 m)
QF 4 inch Mk V World War I	2,350 ft/s (720 m/s)	31 (3 c.r.h.)		9.6	12.3	28,750 ft (8,760 m)
QF 4 inch Mk V World War II	2,350 ft/s (720 m/s)	31 (4.38/6 c.r.h.)				31,000 ft (9,400 m)

== Ammunition ==
Ammunition for the original low-angle guns introduced in World War I was Separate QF i.e. the shell and cartridge were separate items, but in World War II most guns used Fixed QF ammunition i.e. a single unit. The fixed Mk V ammunition was 44.3 inches (1.13 m) long and weighed 56 pounds (25 kg), while the projectile was 31 pounds (14 kg).

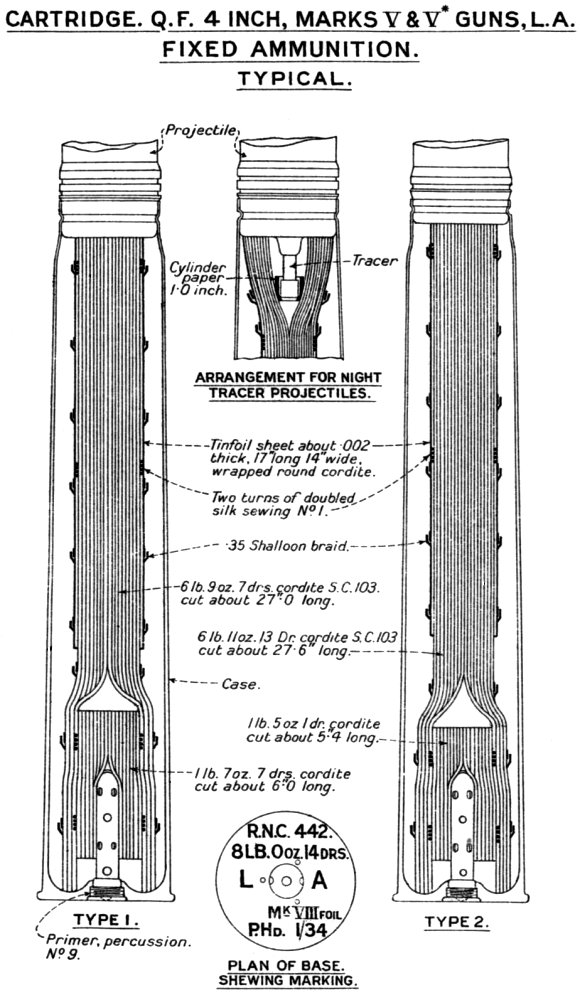
Fixed QF cartridge for LA (low-angle) gun, 1930s

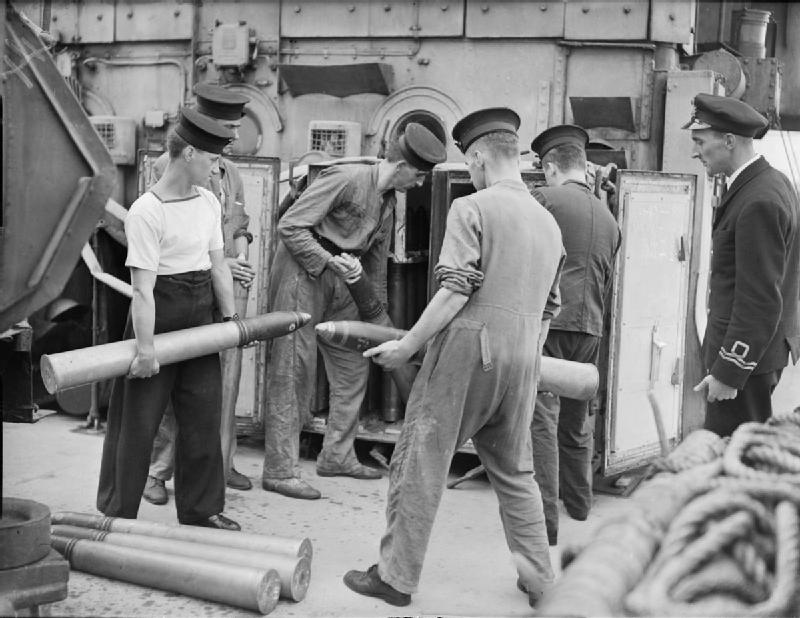
Crew storing fixed rounds on the Kingfisher-class sloop Widgeon, August 1943

== See also ==
- List of anti-aircraft guns
- List of naval guns
- List of naval anti-aircraft guns

=== Weapons of comparable role, performance and era ===
- Cannone da 102/45 S.A. Mod. 1917 Italian modified copy of the QF Mk V made under license
- 10.5 cm SK L/45 naval gun Approximate German equivalent firing slightly heavier shell

== Surviving examples ==
- A gun from HMNZS Tutira in front of the Devonport Naval Base, Auckland, New Zealand

== Bibliography ==
- Tony DiGiulian, British 4"/45 (10.2 cm) QF Mark V and Mark XV
- I.V. Hogg & L.F. Thurston, British Artillery Weapons & Ammunition 1914–1918. London: Ian Allan, 1972.
- Brigadier N.W. Routledge, History of the Royal Regiment of Artillery. Anti-Aircraft Artillery, 1914–55. London: Brassey's, 1994. ISBN 1-85753-099-3
- Campbell, John (1985). Naval Weapons of World War Two. Naval Institute Press. ISBN 978-0-87021-459-2.
