= HMS Circe (J214) =

Algerine-class minesweeper

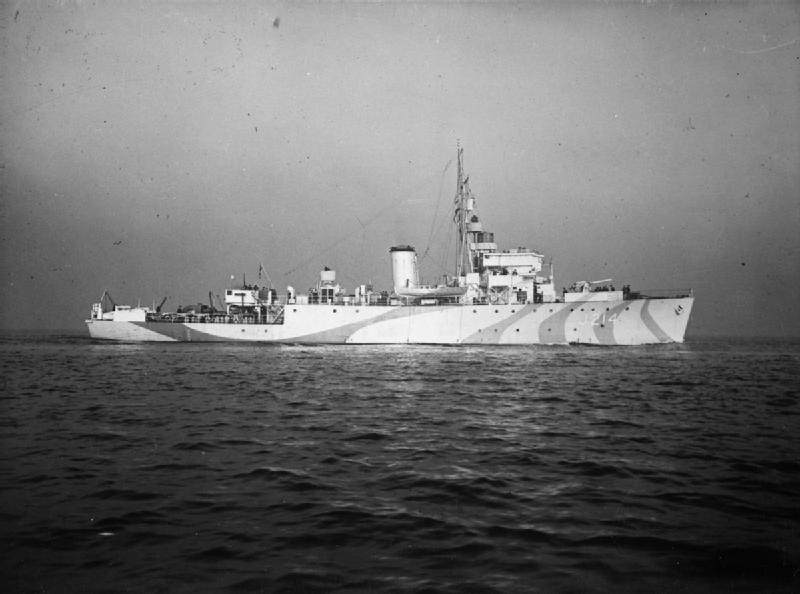
- HMS Circe

History

United Kingdom
- Name: Circe
- Namesake: Circe
- Ordered: 15 November 1940
- Builder: Harland & Wolff, Belfast
- Laid down: 21 July 1941
- Launched: 27 June 1942
- Commissioned: 16 October 1942
- Decommissioned: 1946
- Identification: Pennant number: J214
- Fate: Scrapped, 1956

General characteristics
- Class & type: Algerine-class minesweeper
- Displacement: 850 long tons (864 t) (standard); 1,125 long tons (1,143 t) (deep)
- Length: 225 ft (69 m) o/a
- Beam: 35 ft 6 in (10.82 m)
- Draught: 11 ft 6 in (3.51 m)
- Installed power: 2 × Admiralty 3-drum boilers; 2,000 ihp (1,500 kW)
- Propulsion: 2 shafts; 2 × Parsons geared steam turbines
- Speed: 16.5 knots (30.6 km/h; 19.0 mph)
- Range: 5,000 nmi (9,300 km; 5,800 mi) at 10 knots (19 km/h; 12 mph)
- Complement: 85
- Armament: 1 × QF 4 in (102 mm) Mk V anti-aircraft gun; 4 × twin Oerlikon 20 mm cannon

HMS Circe (J214) was a steam turbine-powered Algerine-class minesweeper during the Second World War.

== Design and description ==
The turbine-powered ships displaced 850 long tons (860 t) at standard load and 1,125 long tons (1,143 t) at deep load. The ships measured 225 feet (68.6 m) long overall with a beam of 35 feet 6 inches (10.8 m). The turbine group had a draught of 11 feet (3.4 m). The ships' complement consisted of 85 officers and ratings.

The ships had two Parsons geared steam turbines, each driving one shaft, using steam provided by two Admiralty three-drum boilers. The engines produced a total of 2,000 indicated horsepower (1,500 kW) and gave a maximum speed of 16.5 knots (30.6 km/h; 19.0 mph). They carried a maximum of 660 long tons (671 t) of fuel oil that gave them a range of 5,000 nautical miles (9,300 km; 5,800 mi) at 10 knots (19 km/h; 12 mph).

The Algerine class was armed with a QF 4 in (102 mm) Mk V anti-aircraft gun and four twin-gun mounts for Oerlikon 20 mm cannon. The latter guns were in short supply when the first ships were being completed and they often got a proportion of single mounts. By 1944, single-barrel Bofors 40 mm mounts began replacing the twin 20 mm mounts on a one for one basis. All of the ships were fitted for four throwers and two rails for depth charges.

== Construction and career ==
The ship was ordered on 15 November 1940 at the Harland & Wolff at Belfast, Ireland. She was laid down on 21 July 1941 and launched on 22 May 1944. The ship was commissioned on 16 October 1942.

In April 1943, she was selected for duty with her Minesweeping Flotilla for clearance of passage through Galita and Sicilian channels to Tripoli to ensure safe passage for allied ships, also known as Operation Antidote. In July, the ship together with Acute and Albacore took part in minesweeping missions prior to Operation Husky. In September, she was deployed to sweep the area in preparation for Operation Avalanche.

On 21 January 1944, she was deployed with Acute, Espiegle and Spanker to conduct minesweeping mission North West of Anzio in preparation for Operation Shingle.

From January to February 1945, she swept the waters in the Kinaros and Doro Channels.

In April 1946, the ship and her sisters were sent back to the UK to be decommissioned on arrival. The ship was put into the reserve fleet and laid up at Harwich until the ship was transferred to be used as a RNVR Drill Ship at Dundee.

In 1956, she was put on the disposal list and sold to BISCO for scrap by the Arnott Young & Co. at Glasgow, Scotland in which she arrived in March 1957.

== Bibliography ==
- Chesneau, Roger, ed. (1980). Conway's All the World's Fighting Ships 1922–1946. Greenwich, UK: Conway Maritime Press. ISBN 0-85177-146-7.
- Colledge, J. J.; Warlow, Ben (2006) [1969]. Ships of the Royal Navy: The Complete Record of All Fighting Ships of the Royal Navy from the 15th Century to the Present (3rd Rev ed.). London: Chatham Publishing. ISBN 978-1-86176-281-8. OCLC 67375475.
- Elliott, Peter (1977). Allied Escort Ships of World War II: A complete survey. London: Macdonald and Jane's. ISBN 0-356-08401-9.
- Lenton, H. T. (1998). British & Empire Warships of the Second World War. Annapolis, Maryland: Naval Institute Press. ISBN 1-55750-048-7.
