= HMS Mariner (J380) =

Minesweeper of the Royal Navy

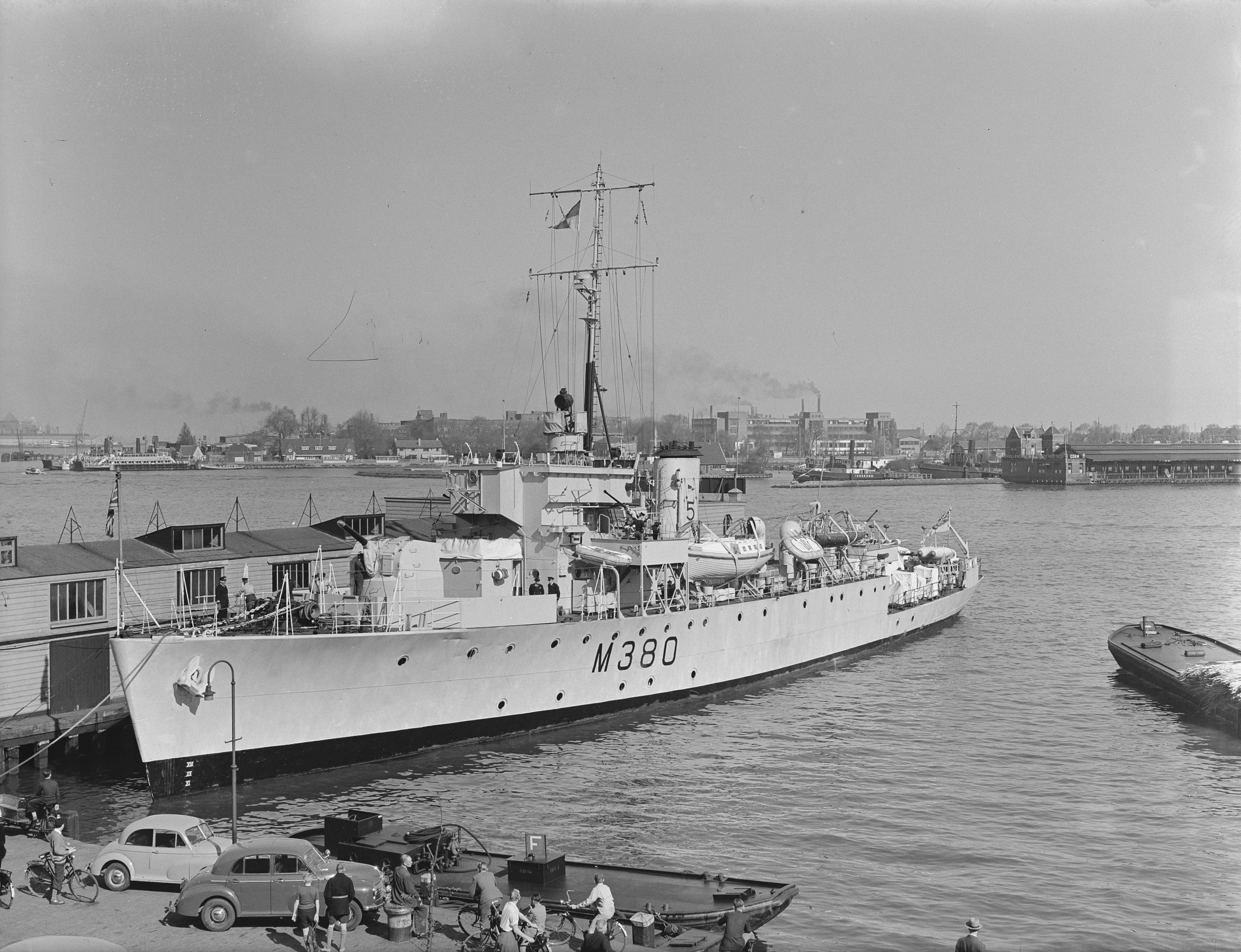

History

United Kingdom
- Name: HMS Mariner
- Builder: Port Arthur Shipbuilding Co., Port Arthur
- Laid down: 26 August 1943
- Launched: 9 May 1944
- Commissioned: 23 May 1944
- Identification: Pennant number J380
- Fate: Sold to the Burmese Navy on 18 April 1958

Burma
- Name: Yang Myo Aung
- Acquired: 18 April 1958
- Fate: Laid up and deleted in 1982

General characteristics
- Class & type: Algerine-class minesweeper
- Displacement: 1,030 long tons (1,047 t) (standard); 1,325 long tons (1,346 t) (deep)
- Length: 225 ft (69 m) o/a
- Beam: 35 ft 6 in (10.82 m)
- Draught: 12.25 ft 6 in (3.89 m)
- Installed power: 2 × Admiralty 3-drum boilers; 2,400 ihp (1,800 kW)
- Propulsion: 2 shafts; 2 vertical triple-expansion steam engines
- Speed: 16.5 knots (30.6 km/h; 19.0 mph)
- Range: 5,000 nmi (9,300 km; 5,800 mi) at 10 knots (19 km/h; 12 mph)
- Complement: 85
- Armament: 1 × QF 4 in (102 mm) Mk V anti-aircraft gun; 4 × twin Oerlikon 20 mm cannon

HMS Mariner was a reciprocating engine-powered Algerine-class minesweeper during the Second World War. Laid down as HMCS Kincardine for the Royal Canadian Navy she was transferred on completion to the Royal Navy as HMS Mariner. She survived the war and was sold to Myanmar in 1958 as Yang Myo Aung.

== Design and description ==
The reciprocating group displaced 1,010–1,030 long tons (1,030–1,050 t) at standard load and 1,305–1,325 long tons (1,326–1,346 t) at deep load The ships measured 225 feet (68.6 m) long overall with a beam of 35 feet 6 inches (10.8 m). They had a draught of 12 feet 3 inches (3.7 m). The ships' complement consisted of 85 officers and ratings.

The reciprocating ships had two vertical triple-expansion steam engines, each driving one shaft, using steam provided by two Admiralty three-drum boilers. The engines produced a total of 2,400 indicated horsepower (1,800 kW) and gave a maximum speed of 16.5 knots (30.6 km/h; 19.0 mph). They carried a maximum of 660 long tons (671 t) of fuel oil that gave them a range of 5,000 nautical miles (9,300 km; 5,800 mi) at 10 knots (19 km/h; 12 mph).

The Algerine class was armed with a QF 4 in (102 mm) Mk V anti-aircraft gun and four twin-gun mounts for Oerlikon 20 mm cannon. The latter guns were in short supply when the first ships were being completed and they often got a proportion of single mounts. By 1944, single-barrel Bofors 40 mm mounts began replacing the twin 20 mm mounts on a one for one basis. All of the ships were fitted for four throwers and two rails for depth charges.

== Construction and career ==
The ship was put on order as HMCS Kincardine by the Royal Canadian Navy in July 1942 at the Port Arthur Shipbuilding Company at Port Arthur, Ontario, Canada. She was laid down on 26 August 1942 and launched on 9 May 1944. On completion she was transferred to the Royal Navy as part of an exchange for an equal number of Castle-class corvettes. She was commissioned as HMS Mariner on 23 May 1944. In 1954 Mariner was on patrol in the North Sea as a fishery protection vessel, checking trawlers nets, and giving aid to any of the trawlers should they need it.

She was sold to the Burmese Navy and was reactivated at HM Dockyard Sheerness. She was handed over to Burma in the pools of London on 18 April 1958 and renamed Yang Myo Aung. She was fitted as a minelayer, carrying eight mines in each side.

She served in the Burmese Navy until 1982.

== Bibliography ==
- Chesneau, Roger, ed. (1980). Conway's All the World's Fighting Ships 1922–1946. Greenwich, UK: Conway Maritime Press. ISBN 0-85177-146-7.
- Colledge, J. J.; Warlow, Ben (2006) [1969]. Ships of the Royal Navy: The Complete Record of All Fighting Ships of the Royal Navy from the 15th Century to the Present (3rd Rev ed.). London: Chatham Publishing. ISBN 978-1-86176-281-8. OCLC 67375475.
- Elliott, Peter (1977). Allied Escort Ships of World War II: A complete survey. London: Macdonald and Jane's. ISBN 0-356-08401-9.
- Lenton, H. T. (1998). British & Empire Warships of the Second World War. Annapolis, Maryland: Naval Institute Press. ISBN 1-55750-048-7.
