= HMS Liberty (J391) =

Algerine-class minesweeper

Coordinates: 51.2108215°N 3.2610586°E

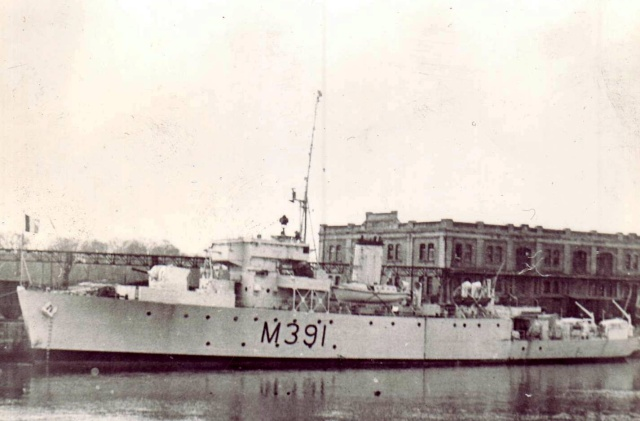
- HMS Liberty (M391)

History

United Kingdom
- Name: Liberty
- Namesake: Liberty
- Ordered: 30 April 1942
- Builder: Harland & Wolff, Belfast
- Laid down: 27 November 1943
- Launched: 22 August 1944
- Commissioned: 18 January 1945
- Decommissioned: July 1946
- Reclassified: M391, 1949
- Identification: Pennant number: J391
- Fate: Sold to the Belgium, 1949

Belgium
- Name: Adrien de Gerlache
- Namesake: Adrien de Gerlache
- Acquired: 1949
- Commissioned: 29 November 1949
- Decommissioned: 11 June 1970
- Reclassified: A954, 1959
- Stricken: 1970
- Identification: Callsign: ORJA; Pennant number: M900
- Fate: Scrapped, 1970

General characteristics
- Class & type: Algerine-class minesweeper
- Displacement: 850 long tons (864 t) (standard); 1,125 long tons (1,143 t) (deep)
- Length: 225 ft (69 m) o/a
- Beam: 35 ft 6 in (10.82 m)
- Draught: 11 ft 6 in (3.51 m)
- Installed power: 2 × Admiralty 3-drum boilers; 2,000 ihp (1,500 kW)
- Propulsion: 2 shafts; 2 × Parsons geared steam turbines
- Speed: 16.5 knots (30.6 km/h; 19.0 mph)
- Range: 5,000 nmi (9,300 km; 5,800 mi) at 10 knots (19 km/h; 12 mph)
- Complement: 85
- Armament: 1 × QF 4 in (102 mm) Mk V anti-aircraft gun; 4 × twin Oerlikon 20 mm cannon

HMS Liberty (J391) was a steam turbine-powered Algerine-class minesweeper during the Second World War. She survived the war and was sold to Belgium in 1949 as Adrien de Gerlache (M900).

== Design and description ==
The turbine-powered ships displaced 850 long tons (860 t) at standard load and 1,125 long tons (1,143 t) at deep load. The ships measured 225 feet (68.6 m) long overall with a beam of 35 feet 6 inches (10.8 m). The turbine group had a draught of 11 feet (3.4 m). The ships' complement consisted of 85 officers and ratings.

The ships had two Parsons geared steam turbines, each driving one shaft, using steam provided by two Admiralty three-drum boilers. The engines produced a total of 2,000 indicated horsepower (1,500 kW) and gave a maximum speed of 16.5 knots (30.6 km/h; 19.0 mph). They carried a maximum of 660 long tons (671 t) of fuel oil that gave them a range of 5,000 nautical miles (9,300 km; 5,800 mi) at 10 knots (19 km/h; 12 mph).

The Algerine class was armed with a QF 4 in (102 mm) Mk V anti-aircraft gun and four twin-gun mounts for Oerlikon 20 mm cannon. The latter guns were in short supply when the first ships were being completed and they often got a proportion of single mounts. By 1944, single-barrel Bofors 40 mm mounts began replacing the twin 20 mm mounts on a one for one basis. All of the ships were fitted for four throwers and two rails for depth charges.

== Construction and career ==
=== Service in the Royal Navy ===
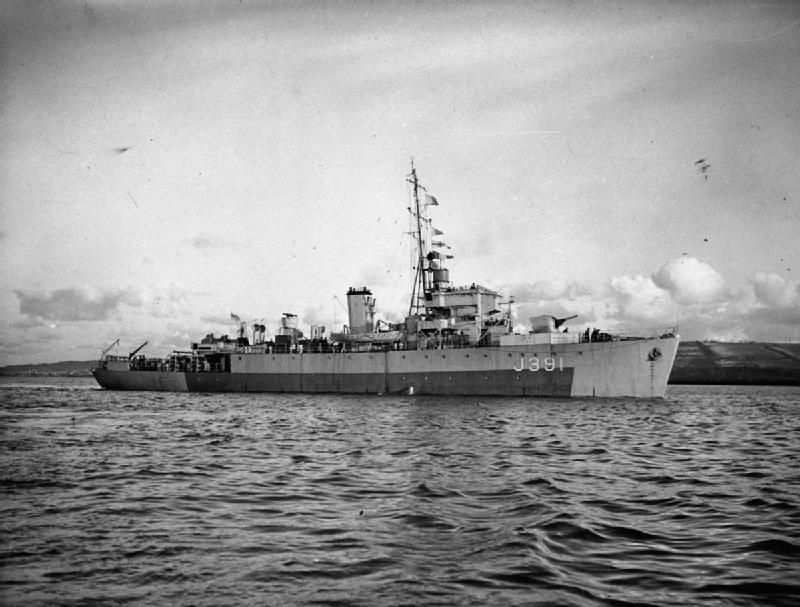
Liberty in the 1940s

The ship was ordered on 30 April 1942 at the Harland & Wolff at Belfast, Ireland. She was laid down on 27 November 1943 and launched on 22 August 1944. She was commissioned on 18 January 1945. She joined the 10th Minesweeper Flotilla.

In April 1945, she was deployed with her flotilla for minesweeping in southern North Sea to ensure safe passage of convoys in Nore Command including military convoys to Antwerp as well as in the Thames estuary for traffic in North Sea.

In October 1945, she was deployed for mine clearance in areas near Singapore including ports in Indonesia she was later based at Hong Kong for similar duties. The ship returned to UK and arrived at Portsmouth to be decommissioned and put into the reserve fleet status in July 1946.

She was then sold to Belgium in 1949.

=== Service in the Belgian Navy ===
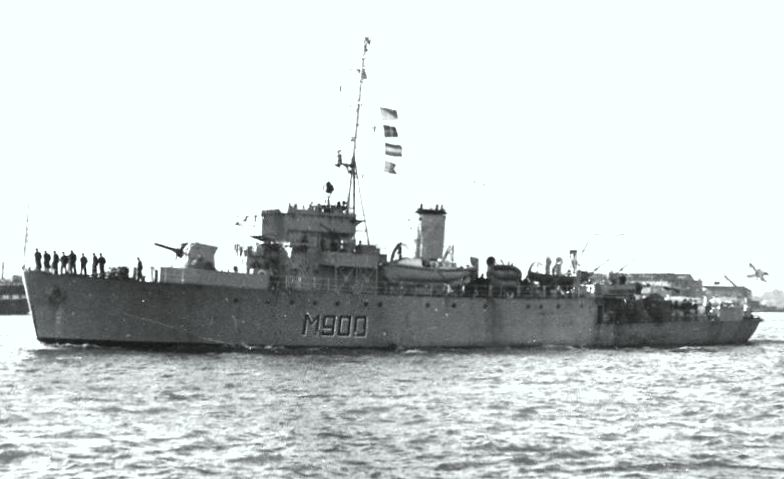
Adrien de Gerlache (M900)

Liberty was renamed Adrien de Gerlache and was commissioned on 29 November 1949.

His Royal Highness Prince Baudouin in 1950 visited the Adrien de Gerlache.

In 1959, her pennant number was changed to A954.

On 19 September 1965, she departed from Ostend for the Mediterranean off Sardinia, for a NATO exercise. With stopovers in Gibraltar, Palma de Mallorca, Cagliari and Cadiz. Return to Ostend on 28 October.

The ship was decommissioned on 11 June 1970 and sold for to Mr. Bakker P.V.B.A, Bruges for scrap in 1970.

The superstructure is part of the Belgian Naval Academy in Brugge.

== Bibliography ==
- Chesneau, Roger, ed. (1980). Conway's All the World's Fighting Ships 1922–1946. Greenwich, UK: Conway Maritime Press. ISBN 0-85177-146-7.
- Colledge, J. J.; Warlow, Ben (2006) [1969]. Ships of the Royal Navy: The Complete Record of All Fighting Ships of the Royal Navy from the 15th Century to the Present (3rd Rev ed.). London: Chatham Publishing. ISBN 978-1-86176-281-8. OCLC 67375475.
- Elliott, Peter (1977). Allied Escort Ships of World War II: A complete survey. London: Macdonald and Jane's. ISBN 0-356-08401-9.
- Lenton, H. T. (1998). British & Empire Warships of the Second World War. Annapolis, Maryland: Naval Institute Press. ISBN 1-55750-048-7.
