= HMS Jewel (J390) =

Algerine-class minesweeper

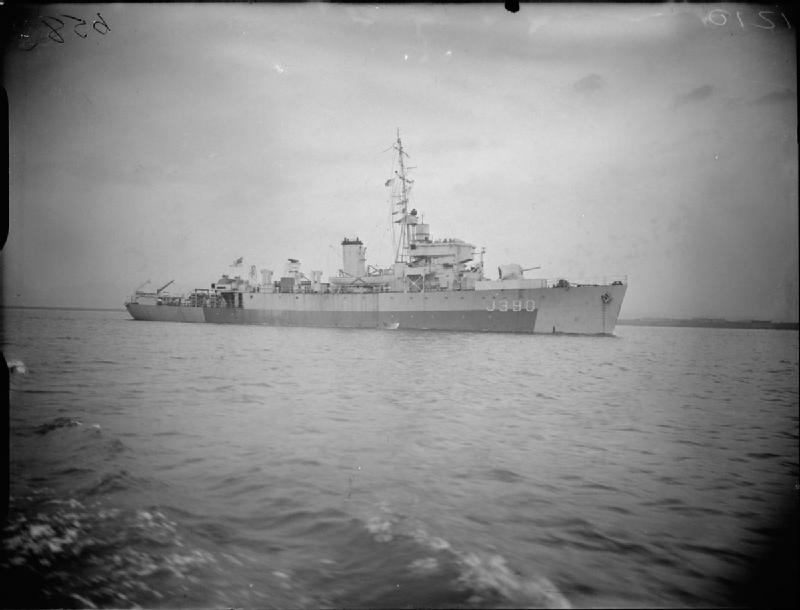
- HMS Jewel

History

United Kingdom
- Name: Jewel
- Namesake: Jewel
- Ordered: 30 April 1942
- Builder: Harland & Wolff, Belfast
- Laid down: 27 November 1943
- Launched: 20 July 1944
- Commissioned: 9 December 1944
- Decommissioned: September 1946
- Recommissioned: 28 December 1955
- Decommissioned: 1961
- Identification: Pennant number: J390
- Fate: Scrapped, 1966

General characteristics
- Class & type: Algerine-class minesweeper
- Displacement: 850 long tons (864 t) (standard); 1,125 long tons (1,143 t) (deep)
- Length: 225 ft (69 m) o/a
- Beam: 35 ft 6 in (10.82 m)
- Draught: 11 ft 6 in (3.51 m)
- Installed power: 2 × Admiralty 3-drum boilers; 2,000 ihp (1,500 kW)
- Propulsion: 2 shafts; 2 × Parsons geared steam turbines
- Speed: 16.5 knots (30.6 km/h; 19.0 mph)
- Range: 5,000 nmi (9,300 km; 5,800 mi) at 10 knots (19 km/h; 12 mph)
- Complement: 85
- Armament: 1 × QF 4 in (102 mm) Mk V anti-aircraft gun; 4 × twin Oerlikon 20 mm cannon

HMS Jewel (J390) was a steam turbine-powered Algerine-class minesweeper during the Second World War.

== Design and description ==
The turbine-powered ships displaced 850 long tons (860 t) at standard load and 1,125 long tons (1,143 t) at deep load. The ships measured 225 feet (68.6 m) long overall with a beam of 35 feet 6 inches (10.8 m). The turbine group had a draught of 11 feet (3.4 m). The ships' complement consisted of 85 officers and ratings.

The ships had two Parsons geared steam turbines, each driving one shaft, using steam provided by two Admiralty three-drum boilers. The engines produced a total of 2,000 indicated horsepower (1,500 kW) and gave a maximum speed of 16.5 knots (30.6 km/h; 19.0 mph). They carried a maximum of 660 long tons (671 t) of fuel oil that gave them a range of 5,000 nautical miles (9,300 km; 5,800 mi) at 10 knots (19 km/h; 12 mph).

The Algerine class was armed with a QF 4 in (102 mm) Mk V anti-aircraft gun and four twin-gun mounts for Oerlikon 20 mm cannon. The latter guns were in short supply when the first ships were being completed and they often got a proportion of single mounts. By 1944, single-barrel Bofors 40 mm mounts began replacing the twin 20 mm mounts on a one for one basis. All of the ships were fitted for four throwers and two rails for depth charges.

== Construction and career ==
The ship was ordered on 30 April 1942 at the Harland & Wolff at Belfast, Ireland. She was laid down on 27 November 1943 and launched on 20 July 1944. The ship was commissioned on 9 December 1944.

On 21 February 1945, she was deployed to Scapa Flow during Operation Shred. Two days later, she swept the Norwegian waters during Operation Groundsheet. In October, she was stationed in Singapore as part of the 10th Flotilla.

In September 1946, the ship was sent back to the UK to be decommissioned on arrival. The ship was put into the reserve fleet and laid up at Harwich until the ship was transferred to be used as a RNVR Drill Ship at Dundee in January 1948.

On 28 December 1955, she was recommissioned into the Dartmouth Training Squadron in which she trained Cadets from the Royal Naval College at Dartmouth until 1961.

In 1956 she was the starting vessel for the Torbay to Lisbon yacht race - now considered to be the first modern Tall Ship Race.

In 1966, she was put on the disposal list and sold to BISCO for scrap at Inverkeithing, Scotland in which she arrived on 7 April 1967.

== Bibliography ==
- Chesneau, Roger, ed. (1980). Conway's All the World's Fighting Ships 1922–1946. Greenwich, UK: Conway Maritime Press. ISBN 0-85177-146-7.
- Colledge, J. J.; Warlow, Ben (2006) [1969]. Ships of the Royal Navy: The Complete Record of All Fighting Ships of the Royal Navy from the 15th Century to the Present (3rd Rev ed.). London: Chatham Publishing. ISBN 978-1-86176-281-8. OCLC 67375475.
- Elliott, Peter (1977). Allied Escort Ships of World War II: A complete survey. London: Macdonald and Jane's. ISBN 0-356-08401-9.
- Lenton, H. T. (1998). British & Empire Warships of the Second World War. Annapolis, Maryland: Naval Institute Press. ISBN 1-55750-048-7.
