= HMS Felicity =

Algerine-class minesweeper

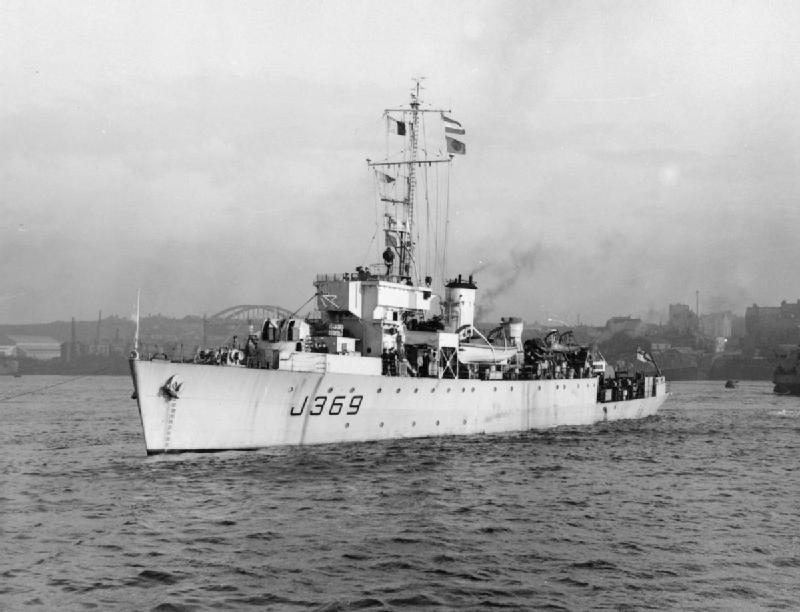
- HMS Felicity

History

United Kingdom
- Name: Felicity
- Namesake: Felicity
- Ordered: 25 November 1942
- Builder: Redfern Construction, Toronto
- Laid down: 22 September 1943
- Launched: 19 January 1944
- Commissioned: 10 August 1944
- Decommissioned: 1947
- Renamed: from Coppercliff
- Namesake: Coppercliff
- Identification: Pennant number: J369
- Fate: Scrapped, 1957

General characteristics
- Class & type: Algerine-class minesweeper
- Displacement: 1,030 long tons (1,047 t) (standard); 1,325 long tons (1,346 t) (deep)
- Length: 225 ft (69 m) o/a
- Beam: 35 ft 6 in (10.82 m)
- Draught: 12.25 ft 6 in (3.89 m)
- Installed power: 2 × Admiralty 3-drum boilers; 2,400 ihp (1,800 kW)
- Propulsion: 2 shafts; 2 vertical triple-expansion steam engines
- Speed: 16.5 knots (30.6 km/h; 19.0 mph)
- Range: 5,000 nmi (9,300 km; 5,800 mi) at 10 knots (19 km/h; 12 mph)
- Complement: 85
- Armament: 1 × QF 4 in (102 mm) Mk V anti-aircraft gun; 4 × twin Oerlikon 20 mm cannon

HMS Felicity (J369) was a reciprocating engine-powered Algerine-class minesweeper during the Second World War.

== Design and description ==
The reciprocating group displaced 1,010–1,030 long tons (1,030–1,050 t) at standard load and 1,305–1,325 long tons (1,326–1,346 t) at deep load The ships measured 225 feet (68.6 m) long overall with a beam of 35 feet 6 inches (10.8 m). They had a draught of 12 feet 3 inches (3.7 m). The ships' complement consisted of 85 officers and ratings.

The reciprocating ships had two vertical triple-expansion steam engines, each driving one shaft, using steam provided by two Admiralty three-drum boilers. The engines produced a total of 2,400 indicated horsepower (1,800 kW) and gave a maximum speed of 16.5 knots (30.6 km/h; 19.0 mph). They carried a maximum of 660 long tons (671 t) of fuel oil that gave them a range of 5,000 nautical miles (9,300 km; 5,800 mi) at 10 knots (19 km/h; 12 mph).

The Algerine class was armed with a QF 4 in (102 mm) Mk V anti-aircraft gun and four twin-gun mounts for Oerlikon 20 mm cannon. The latter guns were in short supply when the first ships were being completed and they often got a proportion of single mounts. By 1944, single-barrel Bofors 40 mm mounts began replacing the twin 20 mm mounts on a one for one basis. All of the ships were fitted for four throwers and two rails for depth charges.

== Construction and career ==
The ship was ordered on 25 November 1942 at the Redfern Construction at Toronto, Canada. She was laid down on 22 September 1943 and launched on 19 January 1944. The ship was commissioned on 10 August 1944. The ship was originally named HMCS Copper Cliff.

In 1947, she was decommissioned and sold to merchant service with the name Fairfree. In 1957, the ship was finally sold for scrap.

== Bibliography ==
- Chesneau, Roger, ed. (1980). Conway's All the World's Fighting Ships 1922–1946. Greenwich, UK: Conway Maritime Press. ISBN 0-85177-146-7.
- Colledge, J. J.; Warlow, Ben (2006) [1969]. Ships of the Royal Navy: The Complete Record of All Fighting Ships of the Royal Navy from the 15th Century to the Present (3rd Rev ed.). London: Chatham Publishing. ISBN 978-1-86176-281-8. OCLC 67375475.
- Elliott, Peter (1977). Allied Escort Ships of World War II: A complete survey. London: Macdonald and Jane's. ISBN 0-356-08401-9.
- Lenton, H. T. (1998). British & Empire Warships of the Second World War. Annapolis, Maryland: Naval Institute Press. ISBN 1-55750-048-7.
