= HMS Hare =

Algerine-class minesweeper

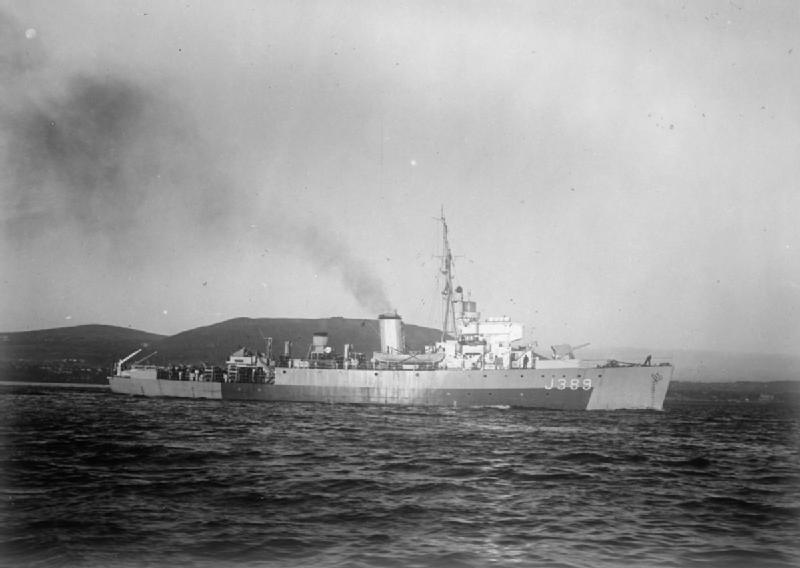
- HMS Hare (J389)

History

United Kingdom
- Name: Hare
- Namesake: Hare
- Ordered: 30 April 1942
- Builder: Harland & Wolff, Belfast
- Laid down: 27 November 1943
- Launched: 20 June 1944
- Commissioned: 10 November 1944
- Decommissioned: 1959
- Identification: Pennant number: J389
- Fate: Sold to Nigeria, May 1958

Nigeria
- Name: Nigeria
- Namesake: Nigeria
- Acquired: May 1958
- Commissioned: 21 July 1959
- Decommissioned: 1962

General characteristics
- Class & type: Algerine-class minesweeper
- Displacement: 1,030 long tons (1,047 t) (standard); 1,325 long tons (1,346 t) (deep)
- Length: 225 ft (69 m) o/a
- Beam: 35 ft 6 in (10.82 m)
- Draught: 12.25 ft 6 in (3.89 m)
- Installed power: 2 × Admiralty 3-drum boilers; 2,000 shp (1,500 kW)
- Propulsion: 2 shafts; 2 geared steam turbines
- Speed: 16.5 knots (30.6 km/h; 19.0 mph)
- Range: 5,000 nmi (9,300 km; 5,800 mi) at 10 knots (19 km/h; 12 mph)
- Complement: 85
- Armament: 1 × QF 4 in (102 mm) Mk V anti-aircraft gun; 4 × Bofors 40 mm

HMS Hare (J389) was a steam turbine-powered Algerine-class minesweeper during the Second World War. She survived the war and was sold to Nigeria in 1958 as HMNS Nigeria.

== Design and description ==
The turbine group displaced 940–980 long tons (960–1,000 t) at standard load and 1,225–1,265 long tons (1,245–1,285 t) at deep load. The ships measured 225 feet (68.6 m) long overall with a beam of 35 feet 6 inches (10.8 m). They had a draught of 12 feet 3 inches (3.7 m). The ships' complement consisted of 85 officers and ratings.

The Algerine class was armed with a QF 4 in (102 mm) Mk V anti-aircraft gun and four single Bofors 40 mm mounts. All of the ships were fitted for four throwers and two rails for depth charges.

== Construction and career ==
=== Service in the Royal Navy ===
The ship was ordered on 30 April 1942 at the Harland & Wolff at Belfast, Northern Ireland. She was laid down on 27 November 1943 and launched on 20 June 1944. Hare was commissioned on 10 November 1944.

Hare was decommissioned on 26 February 1946.

She was then sold to Nigeria in May 1958 with the transfer ceremony took place in Portsmouth.

=== Service in the Nigerian Navy ===
Hare was renamed HMNS Nigeria and was commissioned on 21 July 1959. As part of the ceremony, the silver bell of the cruiser HMS Nigeria, which had been donated in 1940 by Colonial Nigeria, was presented to the minesweeper, which was the Nigerian Navy's new flagship.

The ship was decommissioned in 1962 and returned to the United Kingdom. She arrived in Faslane on 6 November 1962.

== Bibliography ==
- Chesneau, Roger, ed. (1980). Conway's All the World's Fighting Ships 1922–1946. Greenwich, UK: Conway Maritime Press. ISBN 0-85177-146-7.
- Colledge, J. J.; Warlow, Ben (2006) [1969]. Ships of the Royal Navy: The Complete Record of All Fighting Ships of the Royal Navy from the 15th Century to the Present (3rd Rev ed.). London: Chatham Publishing. ISBN 978-1-86176-281-8. OCLC 67375475.
- Elliott, Peter (1977). Allied Escort Ships of World War II: A complete survey. London: Macdonald and Jane's. ISBN 0-356-08401-9.
- Lenton, H. T. (1998). British & Empire Warships of the Second World War. Annapolis, Maryland: Naval Institute Press. ISBN 1-55750-048-7.
