= HMS Rosario (J219) =

Algerine-class minesweeper

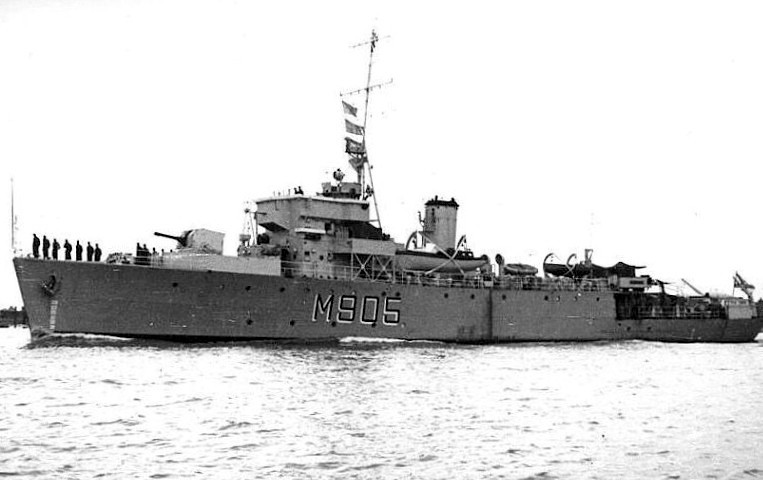
- De Moor (M905)

History

United Kingdom
- Name: Rosario
- Namesake: Rosario
- Ordered: 15 November 1940
- Builder: Harland & Wolff, Belfast
- Laid down: 22 September 1942
- Launched: 3 April 1943
- Commissioned: 9 July 1943
- Decommissioned: 1946
- Identification: Pennant number: J219
- Fate: Sold to the Belgium, January 1953

Belgium
- Name: De Moor
- Namesake: De Moor
- Acquired: 1953
- Commissioned: 15 January 1953
- Decommissioned: 1969
- Identification: Pennant number: M905
- Fate: Scrapped, 1970

General characteristics
- Class & type: Algerine-class minesweeper
- Displacement: 850 long tons (864 t) (standard); 1,125 long tons (1,143 t) (deep)
- Length: 225 ft (69 m) o/a
- Beam: 35 ft 6 in (10.82 m)
- Draught: 11 ft 6 in (3.51 m)
- Installed power: 2 × Admiralty 3-drum boilers; 2,000 ihp (1,500 kW)
- Propulsion: 2 shafts; 2 × Parsons geared steam turbines
- Speed: 16.5 knots (30.6 km/h; 19.0 mph)
- Range: 5,000 nmi (9,300 km; 5,800 mi) at 10 knots (19 km/h; 12 mph)
- Complement: 85
- Armament: 1 × QF 4 in (102 mm) Mk V anti-aircraft gun; 4 × twin Oerlikon 20 mm cannon

HMS Rosario (J219) was a steam turbine-powered Algerine-class minesweeper during the Second World War. She survived the war and was sold to Belgium in 1953 as De Moor (M905).

== Design and description ==
The turbine-powered ships displaced 850 long tons (860 t) at standard load and 1,125 long tons (1,143 t) at deep load. The ships measured 225 feet (68.6 m) long overall with a beam of 35 feet 6 inches (10.8 m). The turbine group had a draught of 11 feet (3.4 m). The ships' complement consisted of 85 officers and ratings.

The ships had two Parsons geared steam turbines, each driving one shaft, using steam provided by two Admiralty three-drum boilers. The engines produced a total of 2,000 indicated horsepower (1,500 kW) and gave a maximum speed of 16.5 knots (30.6 km/h; 19.0 mph). They carried a maximum of 660 long tons (671 t) of fuel oil that gave them a range of 5,000 nautical miles (9,300 km; 5,800 mi) at 10 knots (19 km/h; 12 mph).

The Algerine class was armed with a QF 4 in (102 mm) Mk V anti-aircraft gun and four twin-gun mounts for Oerlikon 20 mm cannon. The latter guns were in short supply when the first ships were being completed and they often got a proportion of single mounts. By 1944, single-barrel Bofors 40 mm mounts began replacing the twin 20 mm mounts on a one for one basis. All of the ships were fitted for four throwers and two rails for depth charges.

== Construction and career ==
=== Service in the Royal Navy ===
The ship was ordered on 15 November 1940 at the Harland & Wolff at Belfast, Ireland. She was laid down on 22 September 1942 and launched on 3 April 1943. She was commissioned on 9 July 1943.

Rosario was decommissioned in 1947.

She was then sold to Belgium in 1953.

=== Service in the Belgian Navy ===
Rosario was renamed De Moor and was commissioned on 15 January 1953.

On 4 April 1967, the ship left Oostende for Australia on a 6-month scientific expedition. She made multiple port calls to Tunis, Port Said, Massawa, Colombo, Djakarta, Fremantle, Melbourne, Sydney, Brisbane, Cairns, Gladstone, Townsville, Darwin, Singapore, Cochin, Diego Suarez, Cape town, Abidjan and Tenerife. She returned to Oostende on 20 February 1968. The ship had to return via South Africa due to the ongoing War of Attrition between Egypt and Israel.

The ship was decommissioned in 1969 and sold for scrap in Bruges, 1970.

== Bibliography ==
- Chesneau, Roger, ed. (1980). Conway's All the World's Fighting Ships 1922–1946. Greenwich, UK: Conway Maritime Press. ISBN 0-85177-146-7.
- Colledge, J. J.; Warlow, Ben (2006) [1969]. Ships of the Royal Navy: The Complete Record of All Fighting Ships of the Royal Navy from the 15th Century to the Present (3rd Rev ed.). London: Chatham Publishing. ISBN 978-1-86176-281-8. OCLC 67375475.
- Elliott, Peter (1977). Allied Escort Ships of World War II: A complete survey. London: Macdonald and Jane's. ISBN 0-356-08401-9.
- Lenton, H. T. (1998). British & Empire Warships of the Second World War. Annapolis, Maryland: Naval Institute Press. ISBN 1-55750-048-7.
