= HMS Pickle (J293) =

Minesweeper of the Royal Navy

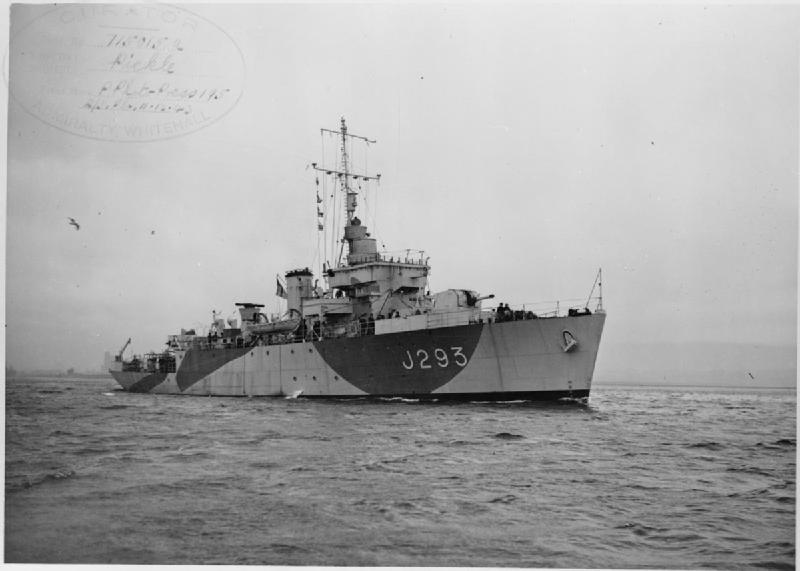
- HMS Pickle c1943 (IWM)

History

United Kingdom
- Name: Pickle
- Builder: Harland & Wolff, Belfast
- Laid down: 11 January 1943
- Launched: 3 August 1943
- Completed: 15 October 1943

History

Ceylon
- Name: Parakrama
- Acquired: 1958
- Commissioned: 1959
- Out of service: 1964
- Home port: Trincomalee
- Fate: broken up, 1964

General characteristics
- Class & type: Algerine-class minesweeper
- Displacement: 850 long tons (864 t) (standard); 1,125 long tons (1,143 t) (deep)
- Length: 225 ft (69 m) o/a
- Beam: 35 ft 6 in (10.82 m)
- Draught: 11 ft (3.4 m)
- Installed power: 2 × Admiralty 3-drum boilers; 2,000 shp (1,500 kW)
- Propulsion: 2 shafts; 2 Parsons geared steam turbines
- Speed: 16.5 knots (30.6 km/h; 19.0 mph)
- Range: 5,000 nmi (9,300 km; 5,800 mi) at 10 knots (19 km/h; 12 mph)
- Complement: 85
- Armament: 1 × QF 4 in (102 mm) Mk V anti-aircraft gun; 4 × twin Oerlikon 20 mm cannon

HMCyS Parakrama, was a turbine-powered Algerine-class minesweeper of the Royal Ceylon Navy, originally built as HMS Pickle (J293) for the Royal Navy during World War II, and transferred to Ceylon by the United Kingdom in 1958. She was scrapped in 1964.

== Design and description ==
The turbine-powered group displaced 850 long tons (860 t) at standard load and 1,125 long tons (1,143 t) at deep load. The ships measured 225 feet (68.6 m) long overall with a beam of 35 feet 6 inches (10.8 m). They had a draught of 11 feet (3.4 m). The ships' complement consisted of 85 officers and ratings.

The ships had two Parsons geared steam turbines, each driving one shaft, using steam provided by two Admiralty three-drum boilers. The engines produced a total of 2,000 shaft horsepower (1,500 kW) and gave a maximum speed of 16.5 knots (30.6 km/h; 19.0 mph). They carried a maximum of 660 long tons (671 t) of fuel oil that gave them a range of 5,000 nautical miles (9,300 km; 5,800 mi) at 10 knots (19 km/h; 12 mph).

The Algerine class was armed with a QF 4 in (102 mm) Mk V anti-aircraft gun and four twin-gun mounts for Oerlikon 20 mm cannon. The latter guns were in short supply when the first ships were being completed and they often got a proportion of single mounts. By 1944, single-barrel Bofors 40 mm mounts began replacing the twin 20 mm mounts on a one for one basis. All of the ships were fitted for four throwers and two rails for depth charges.

== Royal Navy service ==
During construction Pickle was adopted by the civil community of Lunedale in Lancashire during Warship Week in 1942. On commissioning she was based at Tobermory.

In January 1944 she joined the 7th Minesweeping Flotilla and was allocated for minesweeping duties as part of Operation Neptune, the naval component of the Normandy Landings in June 1944.

In 1945 she travelled to the Far East to undertake minesweeping duties to support landings at Rangoon. She returned to the UK in September 1945 for paying off. She did attend the Coronation Review at Spithead in 1953. She was placed in reserve and remained there until earmarked for disposal in 1957.

== Ceylon Navy service ==
In 1958 she was transferred to Ceylon with a formal transfer taking place in Devonport on 6 April 1959.

She remained in service until 1964, after which she was scrapped.

== Bibliography ==
- Chesneau, Roger, ed. (1980). Conway's All the World's Fighting Ships 1922–1946. Greenwich, UK: Conway Maritime Press. ISBN 0-85177-146-7.
- Colledge, J. J.; Warlow, Ben (2006) [1969]. Ships of the Royal Navy: The Complete Record of All Fighting Ships of the Royal Navy from the 15th Century to the Present (3rd Rev ed.). London: Chatham Publishing. ISBN 978-1-86176-281-8. OCLC 67375475.
- Lenton, H. T. (1998). British & Empire Warships of the Second World War. Annapolis, Maryland: Naval Institute Press. ISBN 1-55750-048-7.
