= HMS Maenad (J335) =

Algerine-class minesweeper

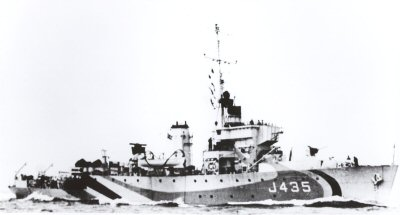
- HMS Maenad showing pennant J435, and in dazzle camouflage

History

United Kingdom
- Name: HMS Maenad
- Builder: Redfern Construction Co., Toronto
- Laid down: 1 March 1943
- Launched: 8 June 1944
- Commissioned: 16 November 1944
- Identification: Pennant number J335
- Fate: Arrived for scrapping on 18 December 1957

General characteristics
- Class & type: Algerine-class minesweeper
- Displacement: 1,030 long tons (1,047 t) (standard); 1,325 long tons (1,346 t) (deep)
- Length: 225 ft (69 m) o/a
- Beam: 35 ft 6 in (10.82 m)
- Draught: 12.25 ft 6 in (3.89 m)
- Installed power: 2 × Admiralty 3-drum boilers; 2,400 ihp (1,800 kW)
- Propulsion: 2 shafts; 2 vertical triple-expansion steam engines
- Speed: 16.5 knots (30.6 km/h; 19.0 mph)
- Range: 5,000 nmi (9,300 km; 5,800 mi) at 10 knots (19 km/h; 12 mph)
- Complement: 85
- Armament: 1 × QF 4 in (102 mm) Mk V anti-aircraft gun; 4 × twin Oerlikon 20 mm cannon

HMS Maenad was a reciprocating engine-powered Algerine-class minesweeper built for the Royal Navy during the Second World War. She survived the war and was scrapped in 1957.

== Name ==
In Greek mythology, the Maenad's were the frenzied women followers of Dionysus (also known as Bacchus), the god of wine.

== Design and description ==
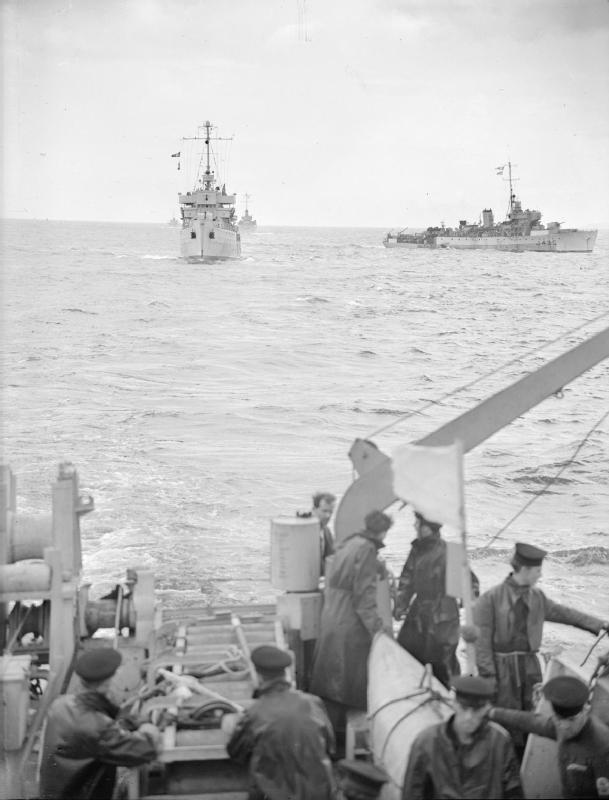
Maenad, right background, on minesweeping operations out of HMS Lochinvar, Granton, Scotland

The reciprocating group displaced 1,010–1,030 long tons (1,030–1,050 t) at standard load and 1,305–1,325 long tons (1,326–1,346 t) at deep load The ships measured 225 feet (68.6 m) long overall with a beam of 35 feet 6 inches (10.8 m). They had a draught of 12 feet 3 inches (3.7 m). The ships' complement consisted of 85 officers and ratings.

The reciprocating ships had two vertical triple-expansion steam engines, each driving one shaft, using steam provided by two Admiralty three-drum boilers. The engines produced a total of 2,400 indicated horsepower (1,800 kW) and gave a maximum speed of 16.5 knots (30.6 km/h; 19.0 mph). They carried a maximum of 660 long tons (671 t) of fuel oil that gave them a range of 5,000 nautical miles (9,300 km; 5,800 mi) at 10 knots (19 km/h; 12 mph).

The Algerine class was armed with a QF 4 in (102 mm) Mk V anti-aircraft gun and four twin-gun mounts for Oerlikon 20 mm cannon. The latter guns were in short supply when the first ships were being completed and they often got a proportion of single mounts. By 1944, single-barrel Bofors 40 mm mounts began replacing the twin 20 mm mounts on a one for one basis. All of the ships were fitted for four throwers and two rails for depth charges.

== Construction and career ==
Maenad was laid down by Redfern Construction Ltd., Toronto, Ontario, Canada on 1 March 1944. She was launched on 8 June 1944 and completed on 11 November of that year. She was initially assigned to the 11th Flotilla of the East Indies Fleet with her last sweep being the Addu Atoll in the Maldives.

Maenad was then put into reserve in March 1947 and became part of the 6th Flotilla based at Singapore. The ship arrived for scrapping at Grays on 18 December 1957.

== Bibliography ==
- Chesneau, Roger, ed. (1980). Conway's All the World's Fighting Ships 1922–1946. Greenwich, UK: Conway Maritime Press. ISBN 0-85177-146-7.
- Colledge, J. J.; Warlow, Ben (2006) [1969]. Ships of the Royal Navy: The Complete Record of All Fighting Ships of the Royal Navy from the 15th Century to the Present (3rd Rev ed.). London: Chatham Publishing. ISBN 978-1-86176-281-8. OCLC 67375475.
- Lenton, H. T. (1998). British & Empire Warships of the Second World War. Annapolis, Maryland: Naval Institute Press. ISBN 1-55750-048-7.
