= HMS Larne (J274) =

Algerine-class minesweeper

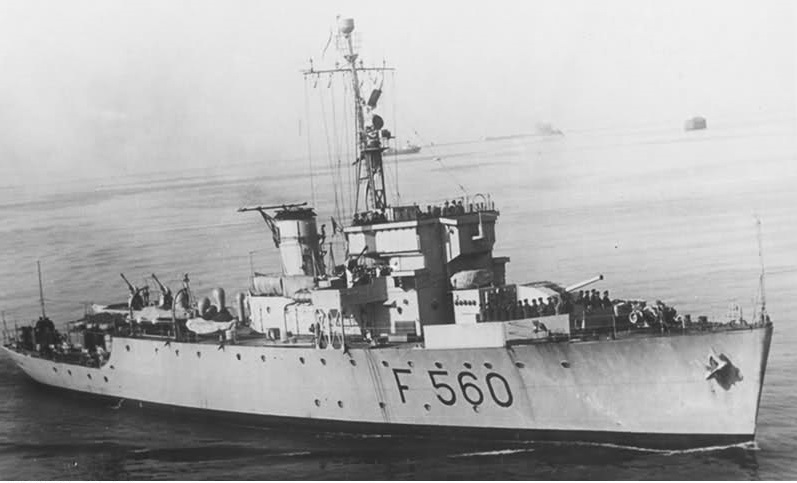
- Alabarda (F 560)

History

United Kingdom
- Name: Larne
- Namesake: Larne
- Ordered: 3 May 1942
- Builder: Lobnitz & Company, Renfrew
- Laid down: 25 January 1943
- Launched: 2 September 1943
- Commissioned: 22 November 1943
- Decommissioned: 1946
- Identification: Pennant number: J274
- Fate: Sold to the Italy, 1946

Italy
- Name: Eritrea
- Namesake: Eritrea
- Acquired: 1946
- Commissioned: 1 April 1950
- Renamed: Alabarda
- Namesake: Alabarda
- Decommissioned: 1 July 1968
- Home port: Taranto
- Identification: Pennant number: F 560
- Fate: Scrapped, 1981

General characteristics
- Class & type: Algerine-class minesweeper
- Displacement: 1,030 long tons (1,047 t) (standard); 1,325 long tons (1,346 t) (deep)
- Length: 225 ft (69 m) o/a
- Beam: 35 ft 6 in (10.82 m)
- Draught: 12.25 ft 6 in (3.89 m)
- Installed power: 2 × Admiralty 3-drum boilers; 2,400 ihp (1,800 kW)
- Propulsion: 2 shafts; 2 vertical triple-expansion steam engines
- Speed: 16.5 knots (30.6 km/h; 19.0 mph)
- Range: 5,000 nmi (9,300 km; 5,800 mi) at 10 knots (19 km/h; 12 mph)
- Complement: 85
- Armament: 1 × QF 4 in (102 mm) Mk V anti-aircraft gun; 4 × twin Oerlikon 20 mm cannon

HMS Larne (J274) was a reciprocating engine-powered Algerine-class minesweeper during the Second World War. She survived the war and was sold to Italy in 1947 as Alabarda (F 560).

== Design and description ==
The reciprocating group displaced 1,010–1,030 long tons (1,030–1,050 t) at standard load and 1,305–1,325 long tons (1,326–1,346 t) at deep load The ships measured 225 feet (68.6 m) long overall with a beam of 35 feet 6 inches (10.8 m). They had a draught of 12 feet 3 inches (3.7 m). The ships' complement consisted of 85 officers and ratings.

The reciprocating ships had two vertical triple-expansion steam engines, each driving one shaft, using steam provided by two Admiralty three-drum boilers. The engines produced a total of 2,400 indicated horsepower (1,800 kW) and gave a maximum speed of 16.5 knots (30.6 km/h; 19.0 mph). They carried a maximum of 660 long tons (671 t) of fuel oil that gave them a range of 5,000 nautical miles (9,300 km; 5,800 mi) at 10 knots (19 km/h; 12 mph).

The Algerine class was armed with a QF 4 in (102 mm) Mk V anti-aircraft gun and four twin-gun mounts for Oerlikon 20 mm cannon. The latter guns were in short supply when the first ships were being completed and they often got a proportion of single mounts. By 1944, single-barrel Bofors 40 mm mounts began replacing the twin 20 mm mounts on a one for one basis. All of the ships were fitted for four throwers and two rails for depth charges.

== Construction and career ==
=== Service in the Royal Navy ===
The ship was ordered on 3 May 1942 at the Lobnitz & Company at Renfrew, Scotland. She was laid down on 25 January 1943 and launched on 2 September 1942. She was commissioned on 22 November 1943.

On 31 July 1944, she was sent to the Mediterranean under the 7th Minesweeper Flotilla and supported Operation Dragoon on the 15 August. During Operation Edgehill on 15 October, she struck a sea mine while sweeping off Cape Kalouri, Greece, which caused major damage to her boiler and No. 1 fuel tank. Unfortunately, two of her engine room crew were also killed by the explosion. Moreover, the flotilla leader, HMS Clinton, also struck a mine under her bow. The next day on the 16th, Larne was beached at Poros, East Coast of Greece. The ship was towed back shortly after and spent the remainder of the war under repair.

She was then sold to Italy in 1946 with the intention of replacing the lead ship of the Azio-class minelayer Azio, which was expected to be decommissioned.

=== Service in the Italian Navy ===
Larne was initially renamed Ammiraglio Magnaghi and later Alabarda

== Bibliography ==
- Chesneau, Roger, ed. (1980). Conway's All the World's Fighting Ships 1922–1946. Greenwich, UK: Conway Maritime Press. ISBN 0-85177-146-7.
- Colledge, J. J.; Warlow, Ben (2006) [1969]. Ships of the Royal Navy: The Complete Record of All Fighting Ships of the Royal Navy from the 15th Century to the Present (3rd Rev ed.). London: Chatham Publishing. ISBN 978-1-86176-281-8. OCLC 67375475.
- Elliott, Peter (1977). Allied Escort Ships of World War II: A complete survey. London: Macdonald and Jane's. ISBN 0-356-08401-9.
- Lenton, H. T. (1998). British & Empire Warships of the Second World War. Annapolis, Maryland: Naval Institute Press. ISBN 1-55750-048-7.
