= HMS Postillion (J296) =

Minesweeper of the Royal Navy

History

United Kingdom
- Name: HMS Postillion
- Builder: Toronto Shipbuilding Co., Toronto
- Laid down: 17 November 1942
- Launched: 18 March 1943
- Commissioned: 25 November 1943
- Stricken: 1976
- Identification: Pennant number J296
- Fate: Sold to Greek Navy in 1947
- Badge

History

Greece
- Name: Machitis
- Acquired: 1947
- Stricken: 1976
- Fate: Sunk as target 1984

General characteristics
- Class & type: Algerine-class minesweeper
- Displacement: 1,030 long tons (1,047 t) (standard); 1,325 long tons (1,346 t) (deep)
- Length: 225 ft (69 m) o/a
- Beam: 35 ft 6 in (10.82 m)
- Draught: 12.25 ft 6 in (3.89 m)
- Installed power: 2 × Admiralty 3-drum boilers; 2,400 ihp (1,800 kW)
- Propulsion: 2 shafts; 2 vertical triple-expansion steam engines
- Speed: 16.5 knots (30.6 km/h; 19.0 mph)
- Range: 5,000 nmi (9,300 km; 5,800 mi) at 10 knots (19 km/h; 12 mph)
- Complement: 85
- Armament: 1 × QF 4 in (102 mm) Mk V anti-aircraft gun; 4 × twin Oerlikon 20 mm cannon

HMS Postillion was a reciprocating engine-powered Algerine-class minesweeper during the Second World War. She was ordered for the United States Navy as USS AM 335, but was transferred on completion under Lend-Lease to the Royal Navy as Postillion. She survived the war and was returned to the USN, being sold to the Greek Navy in 1947.

== Design and description ==
The reciprocating group displaced 1,010–1,030 long tons (1,030–1,050 t) at standard load and 1,305–1,325 long tons (1,326–1,346 t) at deep load The ships measured 225 feet (68.6 m) long overall with a beam of 35 feet 6 inches (10.8 m). They had a draught of 12 feet 3 inches (3.7 m). The ships' complement consisted of 85 officers and ratings.

The reciprocating ships had two vertical triple-expansion steam engines, each driving one shaft, using steam provided by two Admiralty three-drum boilers. The engines produced a total of 2,400 indicated horsepower (1,800 kW) and gave a maximum speed of 16.5 knots (30.6 km/h; 19.0 mph). They carried a maximum of 660 long tons (671 t) of fuel oil that gave them a range of 5,000 nautical miles (9,300 km; 5,800 mi) at 10 knots (19 km/h; 12 mph).

The Algerine class was armed with a QF 4 in (102 mm) Mk V anti-aircraft gun and four twin-gun mounts for Oerlikon 20 mm cannon. The latter guns were in short supply when the first ships were being completed and they often got a proportion of single mounts. By 1944, single-barrel Bofors 40 mm mounts began replacing the twin 20 mm mounts on a one for one basis. All of the ships were fitted for four throwers and two rails for depth charges.

== Construction and career ==
The ship was put on order for the United States Navy in December 1941 at the Toronto Shipbuilding Company. She was laid down on 17 November 1942 as AM 335, launched on 18 March 1943 and completed 25 November the same year. At that point the USN had little need for her, and she was transferred to the Royal Navy under the Lend-Lease arrangement, being commissioned into the Royal Navy on 25 November 1943 as HMS Postillion.

After war service she was returned to the USN in December 1946, and was sold to the Greek Navy in 1947 as Machitis. She was finally used as a target and sunk off Crete in 1984.

== War Service ==
- HX-276 (Departed New York City, 22 January 1944, arrived Liverpool, 7 February 1944 - ESCORT 27/01 - 06/02)
- OS-120/ KMS-94 (Depart Clyde & Downs, 1 April 1945, Convoy Split 7 April 1945 - ESCORT 03/04 - 05/04)

== Bibliography ==
- Chesneau, Roger, ed. (1980). Conway's All the World's Fighting Ships 1922–1946. Greenwich, UK: Conway Maritime Press. ISBN 0-85177-146-7.
- Colledge, J. J.; Warlow, Ben (2006) [1969]. Ships of the Royal Navy: The Complete Record of All Fighting Ships of the Royal Navy from the 15th Century to the Present (3rd Rev ed.). London: Chatham Publishing. ISBN 978-1-86176-281-8. OCLC 67375475.
- Elliott, Peter (1977). Allied Escort Ships of World War II: A complete survey. London: Macdonald and Jane's. ISBN 0-356-08401-9.
- Lenton, H. T. (1998). British & Empire Warships of the Second World War. Annapolis, Maryland: Naval Institute Press. ISBN 1-55750-048-7.
