= HMS Minstrel (J445) =

Algerine-class minesweeper

Coordinates: 12.5327462°N 102.0755306°E

History

United Kingdom
- Name: Minstrel
- Namesake: Minstrel
- Ordered: 15 March 1943
- Builder: Redfern Construction Co., Toronto
- Laid down: 27 June 1944
- Launched: 5 October 1944
- Commissioned: 7 June 1945
- Decommissioned: February 1947
- Identification: Pennant number: J445
- Fate: Sold to the Thailand, 1947

Thailand
- Name: Phosamton; (โพธิ์สามต้น)
- Namesake: Battle of Pho Sam Ton
- Acquired: April 1947
- Commissioned: 20 November 1947
- Decommissioned: 2012
- Reclassified: MSC-451; MSC-611
- Identification: Pennant number: MSF-1
- Status: Museum ship at Nong Bua, Mueang Chanthaburi District

General characteristics
- Class & type: Algerine-class minesweeper
- Displacement: 1,030 long tons (1,047 t) (standard); 1,325 long tons (1,346 t) (deep)
- Length: 225 ft (69 m) o/a
- Beam: 35 ft 6 in (10.82 m)
- Draught: 12.25 ft 6 in (3.89 m)
- Installed power: 2 × Admiralty 3-drum boilers; 2,400 ihp (1,800 kW)
- Propulsion: 2 shafts; 2 vertical triple-expansion steam engines
- Speed: 16.5 knots (30.6 km/h; 19.0 mph)
- Range: 5,000 nmi (9,300 km; 5,800 mi) at 10 knots (19 km/h; 12 mph)
- Complement: 85
- Armament: 1 × QF 4 in (102 mm) Mk V anti-aircraft gun; 4 × twin Oerlikon 20 mm cannon

HMS Minstrel (J445) was a reciprocating engine-powered Algerine-class minesweeper during the Second World War. She survived the war and was sold to Thailand in 1947 as HTMS Phosamton (MSF-1).

== Design and description ==
The reciprocating group displaced 1,010–1,030 long tons (1,030–1,050 t) at standard load and 1,305–1,325 long tons (1,326–1,346 t) at deep load The ships measured 225 feet (68.6 m) long overall with a beam of 35 feet 6 inches (10.8 m). They had a draught of 12 feet 3 inches (3.7 m). The ships' complement consisted of 85 officers and ratings.

The reciprocating ships had two vertical triple-expansion steam engines, each driving one shaft, using steam provided by two Admiralty three-drum boilers. The engines produced a total of 2,400 indicated horsepower (1,800 kW) and gave a maximum speed of 16.5 knots (30.6 km/h; 19.0 mph). They carried a maximum of 660 long tons (671 t) of fuel oil that gave them a range of 5,000 nautical miles (9,300 km; 5,800 mi) at 10 knots (19 km/h; 12 mph).

The Algerine class was armed with a QF 4 in (102 mm) Mk V anti-aircraft gun and four twin-gun mounts for Oerlikon 20 mm cannon. The latter guns were in short supply when the first ships were being completed and they often got a proportion of single mounts. By 1944, single-barrel Bofors 40 mm mounts began replacing the twin 20 mm mounts on a one for one basis. All of the ships were fitted for four throwers and two rails for depth charges.

== Construction and career ==
=== Service in the Royal Navy ===
The ship was ordered on 15 March 1943 at the Redfern Construction Company at Toronto, Canada. She was laid down on 27 June 1944 and launched on 5 October 1944. She was commissioned on 7 June 1945.

On 9 April 1947, a turning over ceremony from the Royal Navy to Royal Siamese Navy was held in the naval dockyard of Singapore. She was commissioned later that year on 20 November.

=== Service in the Royal Thai Navy ===
On 4 April 1953, she was reclassified as a training ship for cadets. Along with the cadets, the ship traveled to Europe for Naval Cadets training and joined the Sea Review on the occasion of Queen Elizabeth II’s coronation day on 2 June.

In 1966, she underwent refit which replaced her main gun with a single Bofors 40 mm gun, two dual Bofors 40 mm Mark 24 guns and two DCT radars.

Her pennant number was later changed to MSC-415, somewhere after 1969.

In 1984, the ship again underwent refit which replaced her main gun with a 3"/50 caliber Mark 22 gun, one single Bofors 40 mm Mark 3 gun, two single Oerlikon 20 mm Mark 10 cannons and a Raytheon 1500B navigation radar.

Her pennant number was again changed to MSC-611, somewhere before 2002.

The ship was decommissioned in 2012 and since then, in October later that year, she was turned into a museum ship and now permanently moored at Nong Bua, Mueang Chanthaburi District, Chanthaburi.

On 13 May 2019, Royal Thai Navy had sent high-ranking officials to inspect the ship for the ship's condition. It was noted that the ship has been in disrepair for a long time and they would be finding a solution to repair her.

== Bibliography ==
- Chesneau, Roger, ed. (1980). Conway's All the World's Fighting Ships 1922–1946. Greenwich, UK: Conway Maritime Press. ISBN 0-85177-146-7.
- Colledge, J. J.; Warlow, Ben (2006) [1969]. Ships of the Royal Navy: The Complete Record of All Fighting Ships of the Royal Navy from the 15th Century to the Present (3rd Rev ed.). London: Chatham Publishing. ISBN 978-1-86176-281-8. OCLC 67375475.
- Elliott, Peter (1977). Allied Escort Ships of World War II: A complete survey. London: Macdonald and Jane's. ISBN 0-356-08401-9.
- Lenton, H. T. (1998). British & Empire Warships of the Second World War. Annapolis, Maryland: Naval Institute Press. ISBN 1-55750-048-7.
