= HMS Ready (J223) =

Algerine-class minesweeper

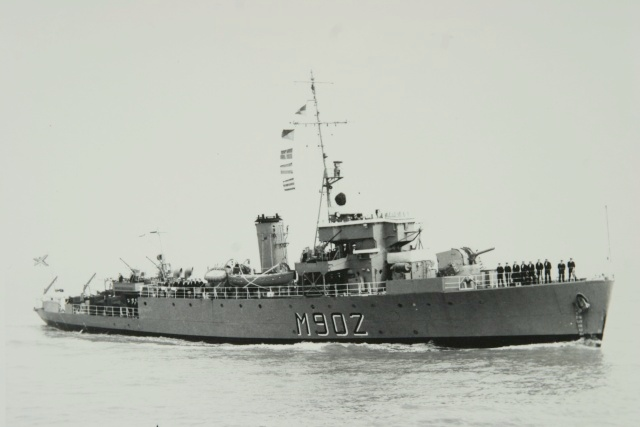
- A. F. Dufour (M902)

History

United Kingdom
- Name: Ready
- Namesake: Ready
- Ordered: 15 November 1940
- Builder: Harland & Wolff, Belfast
- Laid down: 14 April 1942
- Launched: 11 January 1943
- Commissioned: 21 May 1943
- Decommissioned: 1948
- Reclassified: M223, 1949
- Identification: Pennant number: J223
- Fate: Sold to the Belgium, 1951

Belgium
- Name: Van Haverbeke
- Namesake: J.F. Van Haverbeke
- Acquired: 1951
- Commissioned: 4 July 1951
- Decommissioned: June 1960
- Stricken: June 1960
- Identification: Callsign: ORJC; Pennant number: M902
- Motto: Semper Paratus; (Always Prepared)
- Fate: Scrapped, 1961
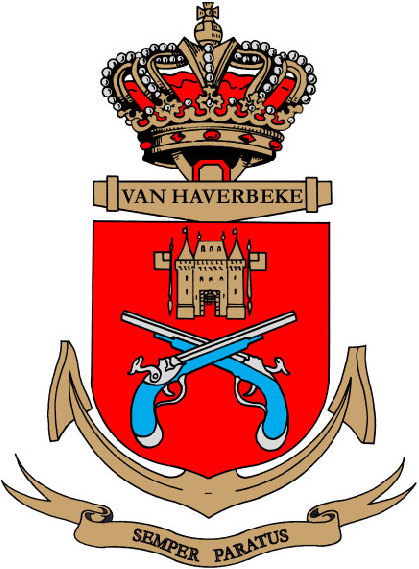
- Badge

General characteristics
- Class & type: Algerine-class minesweeper
- Displacement: 850 long tons (864 t) (standard); 1,125 long tons (1,143 t) (deep)
- Length: 225 ft (69 m) o/a
- Beam: 35 ft 6 in (10.82 m)
- Draught: 11 ft 6 in (3.51 m)
- Installed power: 2 × Admiralty 3-drum boilers; 2,000 ihp (1,500 kW)
- Propulsion: 2 shafts; 2 × Parsons geared steam turbines
- Speed: 16.5 knots (30.6 km/h; 19.0 mph)
- Range: 5,000 nmi (9,300 km; 5,800 mi) at 10 knots (19 km/h; 12 mph)
- Complement: 85
- Armament: 1 × QF 4 in (102 mm) Mk V anti-aircraft gun; 4 × twin Oerlikon 20 mm cannon

HMS Ready (J226) was a steam turbine-powered Algerine-class minesweeper during the Second World War. She survived the war and was sold to Belgium in 1951 as Van Haverbeke (M902).

== Design and description ==
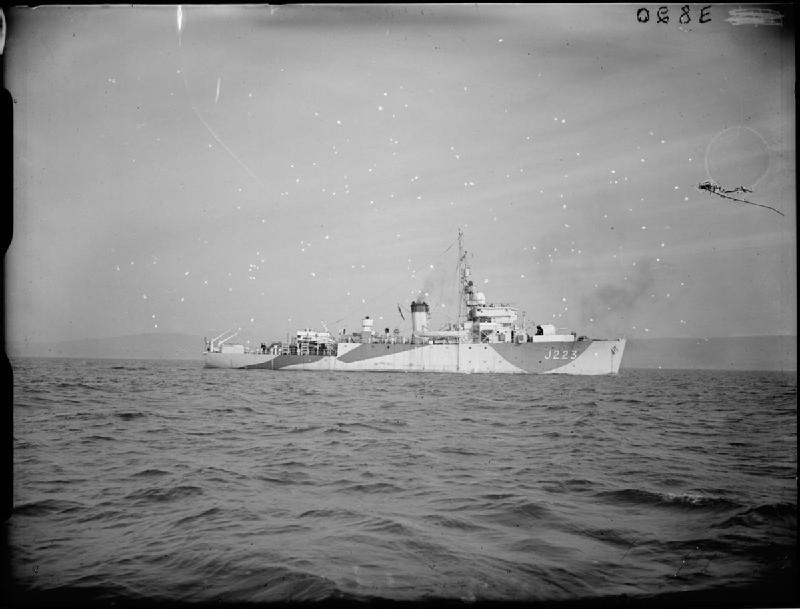
Ready in the 1940s

The turbine-powered ships displaced 850 long tons (860 t) at standard load and 1,125 long tons (1,143 t) at deep load. The ships measured 225 feet (68.6 m) long overall with a beam of 35 feet 6 inches (10.8 m). The turbine group had a draught of 11 feet (3.4 m). The ships' complement consisted of 85 officers and ratings.

The ships had two Parsons geared steam turbines, each driving one shaft, using steam provided by two Admiralty three-drum boilers. The engines produced a total of 2,000 indicated horsepower (1,500 kW) and gave a maximum speed of 16.5 knots (30.6 km/h; 19.0 mph). They carried a maximum of 660 long tons (671 t) of fuel oil that gave them a range of 5,000 nautical miles (9,300 km; 5,800 mi) at 10 knots (19 km/h; 12 mph).

The Algerine class was armed with a QF 4 in (102 mm) Mk V anti-aircraft gun and four twin-gun mounts for Oerlikon 20 mm cannon. The latter guns were in short supply when the first ships were being completed and they often got a proportion of single mounts. By 1944, single-barrel Bofors 40 mm mounts began replacing the twin 20 mm mounts on a one for one basis. All of the ships were fitted for four throwers and two rails for depth charges.

== Construction and career ==
=== Service in the Royal Navy ===
The ship was ordered on 15 November 1940 at the Harland & Wolff at Belfast, Ireland. She was laid down on 14 April 1942 and launched on 11 January 1943. She was commissioned on 21 May 1943.

On 29 December 1944 she captured the miniature submarine Biber 90 which was found with its sole crew-member dead from carbon monoxide poisoning. It was towed to Dover although sunk in the harbour before being recovered.

Ready was decommissioned in 1948.

She was then sold to Belgium in 1951.

=== Service in the Belgian Navy ===
Ready was renamed Van Haverbeke and was commissioned on 4 July 1951.

The ship was decommissioned in June 1960 and sold for to Mr. Bakker P.V.B.A, Bruges for scrap on 7 March 1961.

== Bibliography ==
- Chesneau, Roger, ed. (1980). Conway's All the World's Fighting Ships 1922–1946. Greenwich, UK: Conway Maritime Press. ISBN 0-85177-146-7.
- Colledge, J. J.; Warlow, Ben (2006) [1969]. Ships of the Royal Navy: The Complete Record of All Fighting Ships of the Royal Navy from the 15th Century to the Present (3rd Rev ed.). London: Chatham Publishing. ISBN 978-1-86176-281-8. OCLC 67375475.
- Elliott, Peter (1977). Allied Escort Ships of World War II: A complete survey. London: Macdonald and Jane's. ISBN 0-356-08401-9.
- Lenton, H. T. (1998). British & Empire Warships of the Second World War. Annapolis, Maryland: Naval Institute Press. ISBN 1-55750-048-7.
