= HMS Fancy (J308) =

Algerine-class minesweeper

Coordinates: 6.0081372°S 12.4024879°E

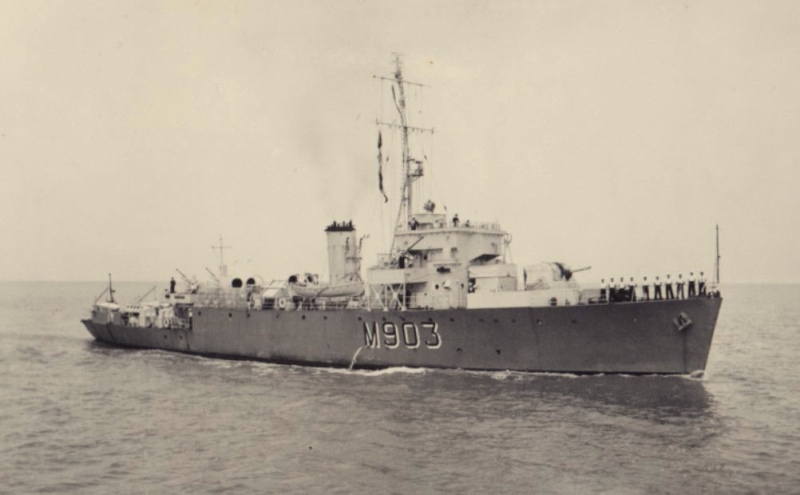
- A. F. Dufour (M903)

History

United Kingdom
- Name: Fancy
- Namesake: Fancy
- Ordered: 25 June 1941
- Builder: Blyth Shipbuilding Company, Blyth
- Laid down: 22 July 1941
- Launched: 20 April 1943
- Commissioned: 21 November 1943
- Decommissioned: December 1947
- Identification: Pennant number: J308
- Fate: Sold to Belgium, 1951

Belgium
- Name: A.F. Dufour
- Namesake: A.F. Dufour
- Acquired: 1951
- Commissioned: 9 August 1951
- Decommissioned: 1957
- Renamed: N'Zadi
- Namesake: N'Zadi
- Decommissioned: 30 June 1960
- Stricken: 1960
- Identification: Call sign: ORJD; Pennant number: M903
- Fate: Abandoned, 1960

General characteristics
- Class & type: Algerine-class minesweeper
- Displacement: 850 long tons (864 t) (standard); 1,125 long tons (1,143 t) (deep)
- Length: 225 ft (69 m) o/a
- Beam: 35 ft 6 in (10.82 m)
- Draught: 11 ft 6 in (3.51 m)
- Installed power: 2 × Admiralty 3-drum boilers; 2,000 ihp (1,500 kW)
- Propulsion: 2 shafts; 2 × Parsons geared steam turbines
- Speed: 16.5 knots (30.6 km/h; 19.0 mph)
- Range: 5,000 nmi (9,300 km; 5,800 mi) at 10 knots (19 km/h; 12 mph)
- Complement: 85
- Armament: 1 × QF 4 in (102 mm) Mk V anti-aircraft gun; 4 × twin Oerlikon 20 mm cannon

HMS Fancy (J308) was a steam turbine-powered Algerine-class minesweeper during the Second World War. She survived the war and was sold to Belgium in 1951 as A.F. Dufour (M903).

== Design and description ==
The turbine-powered ships displaced 850 long tons (860 t) at standard load and 1,125 long tons (1,143 t) at deep load. The ships measured 225 feet (68.6 m) long overall with a beam of 35 feet 6 inches (10.8 m). The turbine group had a draught of 11 feet (3.4 m). The ships' complement consisted of 85 officers and ratings.

The ships had two Parsons geared steam turbines, each driving one shaft, using steam provided by two Admiralty three-drum boilers. The engines produced a total of 2,000 indicated horsepower (1,500 kW) and gave a maximum speed of 16.5 knots (30.6 km/h; 19.0 mph). They carried a maximum of 660 long tons (671 t) of fuel oil that gave them a range of 5,000 nautical miles (9,300 km; 5,800 mi) at 10 knots (19 km/h; 12 mph).

The Algerine class was armed with a QF 4 in (102 mm) Mk V anti-aircraft gun and four twin-gun mounts for Oerlikon 20 mm cannon. The latter guns were in short supply when the first ships were being completed and they often got a proportion of single mounts. By 1944, single-barrel Bofors 40 mm mounts began replacing the twin 20 mm mounts on a one for one basis. All of the ships were fitted for four throwers and two rails for depth charges.

== Construction and career ==
=== Service in the Royal Navy ===
The ship was ordered on 25 June 1941 at the Blyth Shipbuilding Company at Blyth, England. She was laid down on 22 July 1941 and launched on 20 April 1943. She was commissioned on 21 November 1943. She joined the 6th Minesweeper Flotilla.

In March 1944, she conducted her first minesweeping operation off Yarmouth. Then in May, she sweeper the south coast in preparation of the upcoming Invasion of Normandy code named D-Day. Moreover, in June, she cleared ten channels for the invasion force to safely cross.

In April 1945, she was sent to sweep the Adriatic, clearing Venice and Trieste at the same time.

The ship supervised German minesweepers as they swept the waters off Norway in July 1946.

Fancy was decommissioned in December 1947.

She was then sold to Belgium in 1952. The ship underwent refit from June 1952 and February 1953.

=== Service in the Belgian Navy ===
Fancy was renamed A.F. Dufour and was commissioned on 9 August 1951.

On 30 March 1956, the ship left to patrol the waters off Belgium for 3 weeks.

She left Ostend on 2 August 1957 for the Belgian Congo to serve in the training of Congolese personnel at the Banane Naval base, Banana District. She made a stopover in Las Palmas (Canary Island) from August 9 to 10, then in Freetown (Sierra Leone) from August 16 to 18, in Ango-Ango (Angola) on the 26th and in Banana on the 27th. On 3 September, she was renamed N'Zadi.

In 1960, the Belgian Navy left Congo and also leaving behind N'Zadi behind.

The ship still remained at the same position where she was abandoned by the Belgian Navy and is now capsized at the pier.

== Bibliography ==
- Chesneau, Roger, ed. (1980). Conway's All the World's Fighting Ships 1922–1946. Greenwich, UK: Conway Maritime Press. ISBN 0-85177-146-7.
- Colledge, J. J.; Warlow, Ben (2006) [1969]. Ships of the Royal Navy: The Complete Record of All Fighting Ships of the Royal Navy from the 15th Century to the Present (3rd Rev ed.). London: Chatham Publishing. ISBN 978-1-86176-281-8. OCLC 67375475.
- Elliott, Peter (1977). Allied Escort Ships of World War II: A complete survey. London: Macdonald and Jane's. ISBN 0-356-08401-9.
- Lenton, H. T. (1998). British & Empire Warships of the Second World War. Annapolis, Maryland: Naval Institute Press. ISBN 1-55750-048-7.
