= Algerine-class minesweeper =

Class of ships built for the navies of Britain and Canada during World War II

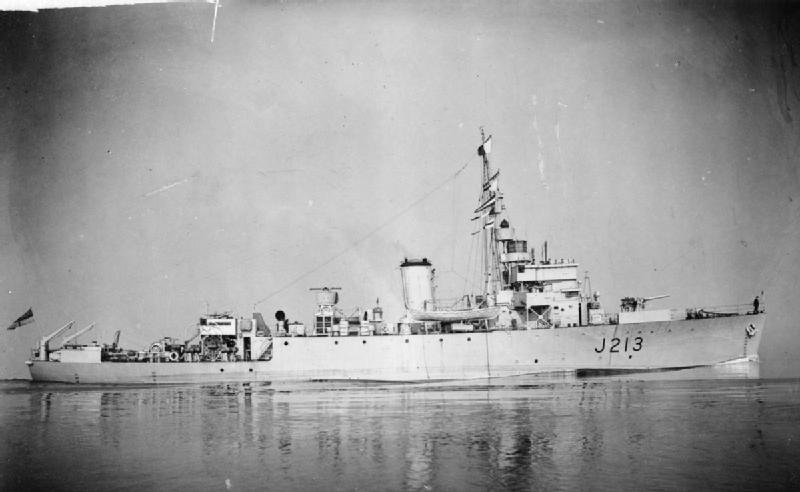
- HMS Algerine

Class overview
- Name: Algerine class
- Builders: United Kingdom (50); Canada (60)
- Operators: Royal Navy; Royal Canadian Navy; Belgian Navy; Burmese Navy; Hellenic Navy; Imperial Iranian Navy; Italian Navy; Royal Nigerian Navy; South African Navy; Royal Ceylon Navy; Sri Lanka Navy; Royal Thai Navy
- Preceded by: Bangor class
- Succeeded by: Ton class
- In service: 1942
- Completed: 110
- Active: 0
- Lost: 6
- Retired: 104
- Preserved: 1; HTMS Phosampton

General characteristics
- Type: Minesweeper
- Displacement: 850–1,030 long tons (864–1,047 t) (standard); 1,125–1,325 long tons (1,143–1,346 t) (deep)
- Length: 225 ft (69 m) o/a
- Beam: 35 ft 6 in (10.82 m)
- Draught: 11 ft (3.4 m)–12 ft 3 in (3.73 m)
- Installed power: 2 × Admiralty 3-drum boilers; 2,400 ihp (1,800 kW) (VTE) or; 2,000 shp (1,500 kW) (turbine)
- Propulsion: 2 shafts; 2 vertical triple-expansion steam engines or; 2 steam turbines
- Speed: 16.5 knots (30.6 km/h; 19.0 mph)
- Range: 5,000 nmi (9,300 km; 5,800 mi) at 10 knots (19 km/h; 12 mph)
- Complement: 85
- Armament: 1 × QF 4 in (102 mm) Mk V anti-aircraft gun; 4 × twin Oerlikon 20 mm cannon; Hedgehog (Escorts only)

The Algerine-class minesweeper was a large group of minesweepers built for the Royal Navy (RN) and the Royal Canadian Navy (RCN) during the Second World War. 110 ships of the class were launched between 1942 and 1944.

== Design and description ==
By 1940 the Royal Navy had realized that the Bangor-class minesweepers were too small to carry the equipment needed to handle magnetic mines. A bigger ship was designed, ironically about the same size as the older Halcyon class that the Royal Navy had rejected earlier as too large and expensive for mass production. The size of the new ship made them suitable for use as ocean-going escort ships and many were used to supplement specialist escorts. Most of the ships built for the RCN were solely employed as such and were fitted with more anti-submarine weapons than the RN ships. To maximise production, alternate designs were made to use either steam turbines or reciprocating steam engines. This enabled ships to be built at yards more used to merchant ship design and as with other mass-produced escort vessels (such as the Flower-class corvettes or the River-class frigates, could use merchant-style reciprocating vertical triple expansion (VTE) engines.

Both groups of ships had the same dimensions, although the VTE powered ships had a greater displacement and a deeper draught. The hull measured 225 feet (68.6 m) long overall with a beam of 35 feet 6 inches (10.8 m). The turbine group had a draught of 11 feet (3.4 m) while the reciprocating engined ships sat 1 foot 3 inches (0.4 m) deeper in the water. The turbine-powered ships displaced 850 long tons (860 t) at standard load and 1,125 long tons (1,143 t) at deep load while the reciprocating engined group displaced 1,010–1,030 long tons (1,030–1,050 t) at standard load and 1,305–1,325 long tons (1,326–1,346 t) at deep load. The ships' complement consisted of 85 officers and ratings.

The turbine-powered ships had two Parsons geared steam turbines, each driving one shaft, using steam provided by two Admiralty three-drum boilers. The engines produced a total of 2,000 shaft horsepower (1,500 kW) and gave a maximum speed of 16.5 knots (30.6 km/h; 19.0 mph). The reciprocating engined ships had two vertical triple-expansion steam engines totalling 2,400 indicated horsepower (1,800 kW) and reached the same speed. They carried a maximum of 660 long tons (671 t) of fuel oil that gave them a range of 5,000 nautical miles (9,300 km; 5,800 mi) at 10 knots (19 km/h; 12 mph).

The Algerine class was armed with a QF 4 in (102 mm) Mk V anti-aircraft gun and four twin-gun mounts for Oerlikon 20 mm cannon. The latter guns were in short supply when the first ships were being completed and they often got a proportion of single mounts. By 1944, single-barrel Bofors 40 mm mounts began replacing the twin 20 mm mounts on a one for one basis. All of the ships were fitted for four throwers and two rails for depth charges. Many Canadian ships omitted their sweeping gear in exchange for a 24-bomb Hedgehog spigot mortar and a stowage capacity for 90+ depth charges.

The construction contracts were awarded to shipbuilders in both the United Kingdom and Canada.

- United Kingdom
  - Blyth Dry Docks & Shipbuilding Co., Blyth
  - Fleming & Ferguson, Port Glasgow
  - Harland & Wolff, Belfast
  - Lobnitz & Co., Paisley
  - William Simons & Co., Paisley
- Canada
  - Collingwood Shipbuilding Co., Collingwood
  - Port Arthur Shipbuilding Co., Thunder Bay
  - Toronto Shipbuilding Co., Toronto
  - Redfern Construction Co., Toronto

== Construction ==
A total of 94 Algerine class vessels served with the Royal Navy; of these 45 were built in the UK and another 49 in Canada. A further 12 vessels served with the Royal Canadian Navy; all these were built in Canada.

The ships were built in the UK were ordered under the 1940 to 1943 war emergency building programmes. The companies involved were Harland & Wolff (22), Lobnitz (18), Blyth (2), Fleming & Ferguson (1) and William Simons (2). Another 15 were ordered in 1943 but cancelled, to free yard space for building Loch-class frigates. The ships were built in two types; 26 powered by steam turbine and 22 by reciprocating or vertical triple expansion (VTE) steam engines. The turbine powered ships were all built by Harland & Wolff, save two, built at Blyth; the VTE powered ships were built at Lobnitz, Simons and Fleming & Ferguson.

Of the ships built in Canada, the companies involved were Toronto Shipbuilding (later Redfern), Port Arthur and Collingwood. All the Canadian-built ships were VTE powered. Only 12 of these ships served with the RCN; a further 17 were built for the RCN but transferred to the Royal Navy in exchange for an equal number of Castle-class corvettes, as the RCN was in need of escort vessels. Fourteen ships were built for the United States Navy, but again were transferred to the RN on completion under Lend-Lease. Nineteen ships were ordered directly by the RN under the 1943 programme; a further six ships were ordered, but cancelled.

== Service history ==
The Algerine class vessels in service with the Royal Navy were employed mainly as minesweepers, though they were equipped as anti-submarine warfare vessels also, and could serve as escort ships as needed. Their ASDIC and depth-charge equipment was equal to that of the Flower-class corvettes or even River-class frigates, though they were not equipped with forward-firing weapons like Hedgehog. Five Algerines were sunk in action, and four others were declared constructive total losses after sustaining damage. The Algerines of the Royal Canadian Navy by contrast were employed as escorts. They were not fitted with mine-sweeping gear, though they were optimized for service in the Arctic. The Algerines served principally as senior ships in Canadian escort groups of the Western Local Escort Force and the Halifax Force. No RCN vessels of the class were lost.

== Post-war service ==
After the war, a number of Algerines continued in service as patrol boats, survey ships, and training ships. On 11 March 1959, HMS Acute and HMS Jewel, training ships at Dartmouth, rescued the burning German coaster Vorman Rass, off Start Point, Devon. At least one, HMS Pickle, was still engaged in minesweeping duties in British waters as late as 1955. All Algerines in RN and RCN service were disposed of by the late 1950s or early 1960s.

Some were sold to other navies or into merchant service. The fourteen ships under Lend-Lease were returned to the USN in 1946; five of these later transferred to the Greek Navy. Of the RN ships, five were transferred to the Belgian Navy, two to South Africa and two to Ceylon; another five, one apiece, were acquired by Burma, Nigeria, Italy, Iran, and Thailand. Two RCN ships were transferred to Belgium in 1959 as replacements for two ex-RN ships that were due for disposal. One, HTMS Phosampton (ex-HMS Minstrel), was in service until 2012 with the Royal Thai Navy.

== Ships ==
Algerine-class ships of the Royal Canadian Navy
Name	Builder	Power	Notes
Border Cities (J344)	Port Arthur Shipbuilding	Reciprocating	1948 sold for demolition
Fort Frances (J396)	Port Arthur Shipbuilding	Reciprocating	Department of Mines and Technical Surveys 1948, broken up 1974
Kapuskasing (J326)	Port Arthur Shipbuilding	Reciprocating	Loan Department of Mines and Technical Surveys 1949–1972, sunk as a target 1978
Middlesex (J328)	Port Arthur Shipbuilding	Reciprocating	Aground near Halifax, 2 December 1946 lost
New Liskeard (J397)	Port Arthur Shipbuilding	Reciprocating	Broken up 1969
Oshawa (J330)	Port Arthur Shipbuilding	Reciprocating	Sold civilian survey vessel 1958, broken up 1966
Portage (J331)	Port Arthur Shipbuilding	Reciprocating	Broken up 1961
Rockcliffe (J335)	Port Arthur Shipbuilding	Reciprocating	Broken up 1960
Sault Ste. Marie (J334)	Port Arthur Shipbuilding	Reciprocating	Broken up 1960
St. Boniface (J332)	Port Arthur Shipbuilding	Reciprocating	Sold mercantile as Bess Barry M. 1948
Wallaceburg (J336)	Port Arthur Shipbuilding	Reciprocating	Sold, Belgian Navy 1959 Georges Lecointe, broken up 1970
Winnipeg (J337)	Port Arthur Shipbuilding	Reciprocating	Sold, Belgian Navy A.F. Dufour 1959, broken up 1966

Algerine-class ships of the Royal Navy
Name	Builder	Powerplant	Fate
Acute (J106)	Harland & Wolff	Turbine	1964 destroyed as a target
Alarm (J140)	Harland & Wolff	Turbine	2 January 1943 badly damaged by mine near Bône; December 1943 sold for demolition
Albacore (J101)	Harland & Wolff	Turbine	1963 broken up
Algerine (J213)	Harland & Wolff	Turbine	15 November 1942 sunk by Italian submarine off Bougie
Antares (J282)	Toronto Shipbuilding	Reciprocating	1947 returned to USA after lend-lease
Arcturus (J283)	Redfern Construction	Reciprocating	1946 returned to USA after lend-lease 1946 sold to Hellenic Navy as Pyrpolitis; 1984 sunk as a target
Aries (J284)	Toronto Shipbuilding	Reciprocating	1946 returned to USA after lend-lease 1947 sold to Hellenic Navy as Armatolos; 1977 sunk as a target
Bramble	Lobnitz & Co	Reciprocating	1961 broken up
Brave (J305)	Blyth Dry Docks	Turbine	1951 RNVR drillship Satellite; 1958 broken up
Cadmus (J230)	Harland & Wolff	Turbine	1950 sold to Belgian Navy as Georges Lecointe; 1960 broken up
Chameleon (J387)	Harland & Wolff	Turbine	1966 broken up
Cheerful (J388)	Harland & Wolff	Turbine	1963 broken up
Circe (J214)	Harland & Wolff	Turbine	1967 broken up
Clinton (J286)	Toronto Shipbuilding	Reciprocating	1947 returned to USA after lend-lease
Cockatrice (J229)	Fleming & Ferguson	Reciprocating	1963 broken up
Coquette (J350)	Redfern Construction	Reciprocating	1958 broken up
Courier (J349)	Redfern Construction	Reciprocating	1959 broken up
Espiegle (J216)	Harland & Wolff	Turbine	1967 broken up
Fancy (J308)	Blyth Dry Docks	Turbine	1950 sold to Belgian Navy as A. F. Dufour; 1959 renamed Nzadi; 1960 broken up
Fantome (J224)	Harland & Wolff	Turbine	1947 broken up
Felicity (J369)	Redfern Construction	Reciprocating	1947 sold mercantile as Fairfree; 1957 broken up
Fierce (J453)	Lobnitz & Co	Reciprocating	1959 broken up
Fly (J306)	Lobnitz & Co	Reciprocating	1949 sold to Imperial Iranian Navy as Palang; 1972 broken up
Flying Fish (J370)	Redfern Construction	Reciprocating	1949 gifted to Royal Ceylon Navy as HMCyS Vijaya; 1972 Sri Lanka Navy; 1975 broken up
Friendship (J398)	Toronto Shipbuilding	Reciprocating	1947 returned to USA after lend-lease
Golden Fleece (J376)	Redfern Construction	Reciprocating	1960 broken up
Gozo (J287)	Redfern Construction	Reciprocating	1946 returned to USA after lend-lease 1947 sold to Hellenic Navy as Polemistis; 1977 deleted
Hare (J389)	Harland & Wolff	Turbine	21 July 1959 sold to Nigerian Navy as HMNS Nigeria; 1962 broken up
Hound (J307)	Lobnitz & Co	Reciprocating	1962 broken up
Hydra (J275)	Lobnitz & Co	Reciprocating	10 November 1944 damaged by mine and not repaired 1947 broken up
Jaseur (J428)	Redfern Construction	Reciprocating	1956 broken up
Jewel (J390)	Harland & Wolff	Turbine	1967 broken up
Laertes (J433)	Redfern Construction	Reciprocating	1959 broken up
Larne (J274)	Lobnitz & Co (transferred from William Simons)	Reciprocating	1947 sold to Italian Navy as Eritrea
Lennox (J276)	Lobnitz & Co (transferred from William Simons)	Reciprocating	1961 broken up
Liberty (J391)	Harland & Wolff	Turbine	1949 sold to Belgian Navy as Adrien de Gerlache; 1969 sold for demolition
Lightfoot (J288)	Redfern Construction	Reciprocating	1946 returned to USA after lend-lease 1947 sold to Hellenic Navy as Navmachos; 1976 withdrawn
Lioness (J377)	Redfern Construction	Reciprocating	1956 broken up
Loyalty ex-Rattler(1943)	Harland & Wolff	Turbine	22 August 1944 sunk by German submarine in the English Channel
Lysander HMS Cornflower 1950–1951	Port Arthur Shipbuilding	Reciprocating	1957 broken up
Maenad (J335)	Redfern Construction	Reciprocating	1957 broken up
Magicienne (J436)	Redfern Construction	Reciprocating	1956 broken up
Mameluke (J437)	Redfern Construction	Reciprocating	1950 broken up
Mandate (J438)	Redfern Construction	Reciprocating	1957 broken up
Mariner (J380)	Port Arthur Shipbuilding	Reciprocating	1958 sold to Burmese Navy as Yan Myo Aung; 1982 withdrawn and laid up
Marmion (J381)	Port Arthur Shipbuilding	Reciprocating	1959 broken up
Marvel (J443)	Redfern Construction	Reciprocating	1958 broken up
Mary Rose (J360)	Redfern Construction	Reciprocating	1957 broken up
Melita (J289)	Redfern Construction	Reciprocating	1959 broken up
Michael (J444)	Redfern Construction	Reciprocating	1956 broken up
Minstrel (J445)	Redfern Construction	Reciprocating	1947 sold to Royal Thai Navy as Phosampton; 2012 withdrawn from service
Moon (J329)	Redfern Construction	Reciprocating	1957 broken up
Mutine (J227)	Harland & Wolff	Turbine	1967 broken up
Myrmidon (J454)	Redfern Construction	Reciprocating	1958 broken up
Mystic (J455)	Redfern Construction	Reciprocating	1958 broken up
Nerissa (J456)	Redfern Construction	Reciprocating	1960 broken up
Niger (J442)	Lobnitz & Co	Reciprocating	1966 broken up
Octavia (J290)	Redfern Construction	Reciprocating	1950 broken up
Onyx (J221)	Harland & Wolff	Turbine	1967 broken up
Orcadia (J462)	Port Arthur Shipbuilding	Reciprocating	1958 broken up
Orestes (J277)	Lobnitz & Co	Reciprocating	1963 broken up
Ossory (J463)	Port Arthur Shipbuilding	Reciprocating	1959 broken up
Pelorus (J291)	Lobnitz & Co	Reciprocating	1947 sold to South African Navy as HMSAS Pietermaritzburg); 1976 stricken 19 November 1994 scuttled in Smitswinkel Bay, South Africa
Persian (J347)	Redfern Construction	Reciprocating	1946 returned to USA after lend-lease 1948 transferred to State Department
Pickle (J293)	Harland & Wolff	Turbine	1959 sold to Royal Ceylon Navy as HMCyS Parakrama; 1964 broken up
Pincher (J294)	Harland & Wolff	Turbine	1962 broken up
Plucky (J295)	Harland & Wolff	Turbine	1962 broken up
Pluto (J446)	Port Arthur Shipbuilding	Reciprocating	1973 broken up
Polaris (J447)	Port Arthur Shipbuilding	Reciprocating	1956 broken up
Postillion (J296)	Redfern Construction	Reciprocating	1946 returned to USA after lend-lease 1947 sold to Hellenic Navy as Machitis; 1976 withdrawn
Prompt (J378)	Redfern Construction	Reciprocating	8 May 1945 damaged by mine (CTL); 1947 broken up
Providence (J325)	Redfern Construction	Reciprocating	1958 broken up
Pyrrhus (J448)	Port Arthur Shipbuilding	Reciprocating	1956 broken up
Rattler see Loyalty	Harland & Wolff	Turbine	22 August 1944 sunk by submarine in the English Channel
Rattlesnake (J297)	Lobnitz & Co	Reciprocating	1959 broken up
Ready (J223)	Harland & Wolff	Turbine	1951 sold to Belgian Navy as Jan van Haverbeke; 1961 broken up
Recruit (J298)	Harland & Wolff	Turbine	1965 broken up
Regulus (J327)	Toronto Shipbuilding	Reciprocating	12 January 1945 sunk by mine in Corfu Channel
Rifleman (J299)	Harland & Wolff	Turbine	1972 broken up
Rinaldo (J225)	Harland & Wolff	Turbine	1961 broken up
Romola (J449)	Collingwood Shipbuilding (transferred from Port Arthur Shipbuilding)	Reciprocating	1957 broken up
Rosamund (J439)	Collingwood Shipbuilding (transferred from Port Arthur Shipbuilding)	Reciprocating	1947 sold to South African Navy as HMSAS Bloemfontein; 5 June 1967 sunk as a target off Simonstown
Rosario (J219)	Harland & Wolff	Turbine	1951 sold to Belgian Navy as De Moor; 1969 broken up
Rowena (J384)	Lobnitz & Co	Reciprocating	1958 broken up
Seabear (J333)	Redfern Construction	Reciprocating	1958 broken up
Serene (J354)	Redfern Construction	Reciprocating	1959 broken up
Skipjack (J300)	Redfern Construction	Reciprocating	1959 broken up
Spanker (J226)	Harland & Wolff	Turbine	1953 sold to Belgian Navy as De Brouwer; 1963 broken up
Squirrel (J301)	Harland & Wolff	Turbine	24 July 1945 scuttled off Phuket, Thailand after mine damage
Stormcloud (J367)	Lobnitz & Co	Reciprocating	1959 broken up
Sylvia (J382)	Lobnitz & Co	Reciprocating	1958 broken up
Tanganyika (J383)	Lobnitz & Co	Reciprocating	1963 broken up
Thisbe (J302)	Redfern Construction	Reciprocating	1957 broken up
Truelove (J303)	Redfern Construction	Reciprocating	1957 broken up
Vestal (J215)	Harland & Wolff	Turbine	26 July 1945 sunk by Japanese aircraft off Phuket, Thailand
Waterwitch (J304)	Lobnitz & Co	Reciprocating	1963 broken up
Wave (J385)	Lobnitz & Co	Reciprocating	1962 broken up
Welcome (J386)	Lobnitz & Co	Reciprocating	1962 broken up
Welfare (J356)	Redfern Construction	Reciprocating	1957 broken up

Cancelled Algerine-class ships
Name	Builder	Powerplant	Fate
Fireball (J464)	Lobnitz & Co	?Reciprocating	Cancelled October 1944
Gabriel (J465)	Lobnitz & Co	?Reciprocating	Cancelled October 1944
Happy Return (J466)	Lobnitz & Co	?Reciprocating	Cancelled October 1944
Larne	William Simons	?Reciprocating	Cancelled March 1942
Lennox	William Simons	?Reciprocating	Cancelled March 1942
Lysander	Harland & Wolff	?Turbine	Cancelled May 1943
Mariner	Harland & Wolff	?Turbine	Cancelled May 1943
Marmion	Harland & Wolff	?Turbine	Cancelled May 1943
Mary Rose	Harland & Wolff	?Turbine	Cancelled May 1943
Moon	Harland & Wolff	?Turbine	Cancelled May 1943
Nicator (J457)	Toronto Shipbuilding	?Reciprocating	
Niger	Toronto Shipbuilding	?Reciprocating	
Nonpareil (J459)	Toronto Shipbuilding	?Reciprocating	
Nox (J459)	Toronto Shipbuilding	?Reciprocating	
Odin (J460)	Toronto Shipbuilding	?Reciprocating	
Providence	Harland & Wolff	?Turbine	Cancelled May 1943
Regulus	Harland & Wolff	?Turbine	Cancelled May 1943
Rowena	Harland & Wolff	?Turbine	Cancelled May 1943
Seabriar	Harland & Wolff	?Turbine	Cancelled May 1943
Serene	Harland & Wolff	?Turbine	Cancelled May 1943
Styx (J440)	Collingwood Shipbuilding (transferred from Port Arthur Shipbuilding)	?Reciprocating	

== Post-war operators ==
Algerine-class ships of the Belgian Navy (post-war)
Name	Ex-	Powerplant	Acquired	Stricken
M900 Adrien de Gerlache	HMS Liberty	Turbine	1949	1969
M901 Georges Lecointe (i)	HMS Cadmus	Turbine	1950	1959
M901 Georges Lecointe (ii)	HMCS Wallaceburg	VTE	1959	1969
M902 Jan Van Haverbeke	HMS Ready	Turbine	1951	1960
M903 A. F. Dufour (i)	HMS Fancy	Turbine	1951	1959
M903 A. F. Dufour (ii)	HMCS Winnipeg	VTE	1959	1966
M904 De Brouwer	HMS Spanker	Turbine	1953	1966
M905 De Moor	HMS Rosario	Turbine	1953	1966

Algerine-class ships of the Royal Ceylon Navy (post-war)
Name	Ex-	Powerplant	Acquired	Stricken
HMCyS Vijaya	HMS Flying Fish	VTE	1949	1975
HMCyS Parakrama	HMS Pickle	Turbine	1959	1964

Algerine-class ships of the South African Navy (post-war)
Name	Ex-	Powerplant	Acquired	Stricken
HMSAS Pietermaritzburg	HMS Pelorus	VTE	1947	1976
HMSAS Bloemfontein	HMS Rosamund	VTE	1947	1967

Algerine-class ships in post-war service in other navies
Name	Ex-	Powerplant	Navy	Acquired	Stricken
Yan Myo Aung	HMS Mariner	VTE	Burmese Navy	1958	1982
HMNS Nigeria	HMS Hare	Turbine	Nigerian Navy	1959	1962
Eritrea (renamed Alabarda)	HMS Larne	VTE	Italian Navy	1947	1981
Palang	HMS Fly	VTE	Imperial Iranian Navy	1949	1972
Phosampton	HMS Minstrel	VTE	Royal Thai Navy	1947	2012

== Algerines sunk in action ==
Five Algerines were sunk in action and four others were written off after sustaining damage.

- Algerine was torpedoed by the Ascianghi off Bougie, Algeria on 15 November 1942.
- Alarm was damaged beyond repair by air attack off Bône, Algeria on 2 January 1943.
- Fantome was mined, and damaged beyond repair, in the Mediterranean on 20 May 1943
- Loyalty (ex-Rattler) was sunk by the U-480 in the English Channel on 22 August 1944.
- Hydra was mined, and damaged beyond repair, off Ostend on 10 November 1944
- Regulus was sunk by a mine off Corfu on 12 January 1945.
- Prompt was mined, and damaged beyond repair, off Ostend on 9 May 1945
- Squirrel was sunk by a mine off Phuket, Thailand on 24 July 1945.
- Vestal was sunk by a Japanese kamikaze plane off Phuket, Thailand on 26 July 1945.

== Bibliography ==
- Chesneau, Roger, ed. (1980). Conway's All the World's Fighting Ships 1922–1946. Greenwich, UK: Conway Maritime Press. ISBN 0-85177-146-7.
- Colledge, J. J.; Warlow, Ben (2006) [1969]. Ships of the Royal Navy: The Complete Record of All Fighting Ships of the Royal Navy from the 15th Century to the Present (3rd Rev ed.). London: Chatham Publishing. ISBN 978-1-86176-281-8. OCLC 67375475.
- Elliott, Peter (1977). Allied Escort Ships of World War II: A complete survey. London: Macdonald and Jane's. ISBN 0-356-08401-9.
- Lenton, H. T. (1998). British & Empire Warships of the Second World War. Annapolis, Maryland: Naval Institute Press. ISBN 1-55750-048-7.
