= HMS Espiegle (J216) =

Algerine-class minesweeper

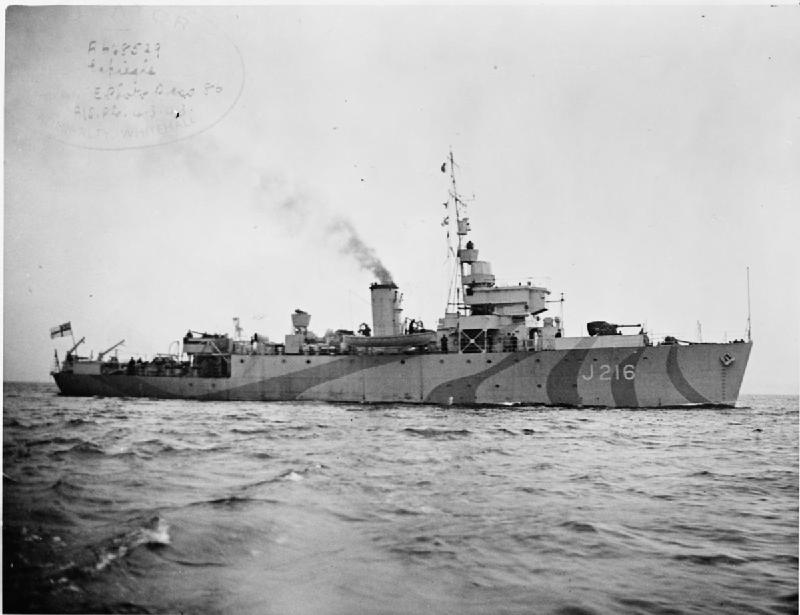
- HMS Espiegle

History

United Kingdom
- Name: Espiegle
- Namesake: Espiegle
- Ordered: 15 November 1940
- Builder: Harland & Wolff, Belfast
- Laid down: 5 February 1942
- Launched: 12 August 1942
- Commissioned: 1 December 1942
- Decommissioned: 1948
- Identification: Pennant number: J216
- Fate: Scrapped, 1966

General characteristics
- Class & type: Algerine-class minesweeper
- Displacement: 850 long tons (864 t) (standard); 1,125 long tons (1,143 t) (deep)
- Length: 225 ft (69 m) o/a
- Beam: 35 ft 6 in (10.82 m)
- Draught: 11 ft 6 in (3.51 m)
- Installed power: 2 × Admiralty 3-drum boilers; 2,000 ihp (1,500 kW)
- Propulsion: 2 shafts; 2 × Parsons geared steam turbines
- Speed: 16.5 knots (30.6 km/h; 19.0 mph)
- Range: 5,000 nmi (9,300 km; 5,800 mi) at 10 knots (19 km/h; 12 mph)
- Complement: 85
- Armament: 1 × QF 4 in (102 mm) Mk V anti-aircraft gun; 4 × twin Oerlikon 20 mm cannon

HMS Espiegle (J216) was a steam turbine-powered Algerine-class minesweeper during the Second World War.

== Design and description ==
The turbine-powered ships displaced 850 long tons (860 t) at standard load and 1,125 long tons (1,143 t) at deep load. The ships measured 225 feet (68.6 m) long overall with a beam of 35 feet 6 inches (10.8 m). The turbine group had a draught of 11 feet (3.4 m). The ships' complement consisted of 85 officers and ratings.

The ships had two Parsons geared steam turbines, each driving one shaft, using steam provided by two Admiralty three-drum boilers. The engines produced a total of 2,000 indicated horsepower (1,500 kW) and gave a maximum speed of 16.5 knots (30.6 km/h; 19.0 mph). They carried a maximum of 660 long tons (671 t) of fuel oil that gave them a range of 5,000 nautical miles (9,300 km; 5,800 mi) at 10 knots (19 km/h; 12 mph).

The Algerine class was armed with a QF 4 in (102 mm) Mk V anti-aircraft gun and four twin-gun mounts for Oerlikon 20 mm cannon. The latter guns were in short supply when the first ships were being completed and they often got a proportion of single mounts. By 1944, single-barrel Bofors 40 mm mounts began replacing the twin 20 mm mounts on a one for one basis. All of the ships were fitted for four throwers and two rails for depth charges.

== Construction and career ==
The ship was ordered on 15 November 1940 at the Harland & Wolff at Belfast, Ireland. She was laid down on 5 February 1942 and launched on 12 August 1942. The ship was commissioned on 1 December 1942 and in April, she was put into the 12th Minesweeping Flotilla.

In May 1943, she was nominated for joint operations with 13th Minesweeping Flotilla for mine clearance of passage through Galita and Sicilian Channels during Operation Antidote. In June, she was nominated for minesweeping and escort duties during the Operation Husky. In September, she was deployed for minesweeping support of Operation Avalanche. In December, she was chosen to take part in the Operation Shingle.

On 14 July 1944, the ship took part in operation to clear a channel to Port of Leghorn with ships of the 19th and 13th Minesweeping Flotilla during Operation Lobster. In October, she was nominated for minesweeping service with her Flotilla in support of the Operation Manna.

From October 1945 until 1948, the ship and her flotilla intercepted ships carrying illegal immigrants into Palestine. The ship was transferred to the 5th Flotilla in December 1946 and put into the reserve fleet in the UK in 1948.

In 1966, she was sold to BISCO for scrap by the Arnott Young at Dalmuir in which she arrived in March 1967.

== Bibliography ==
- Chesneau, Roger, ed. (1980). Conway's All the World's Fighting Ships 1922–1946. Greenwich, UK: Conway Maritime Press. ISBN 0-85177-146-7.
- Colledge, J. J.; Warlow, Ben (2006) [1969]. Ships of the Royal Navy: The Complete Record of All Fighting Ships of the Royal Navy from the 15th Century to the Present (3rd Rev ed.). London: Chatham Publishing. ISBN 978-1-86176-281-8. OCLC 67375475.
- Elliott, Peter (1977). Allied Escort Ships of World War II: A complete survey. London: Macdonald and Jane's. ISBN 0-356-08401-9.
- Lenton, H. T. (1998). British & Empire Warships of the Second World War. Annapolis, Maryland: Naval Institute Press. ISBN 1-55750-048-7.
