= List of patrol vessels of the Turkish Navy =

This is a list of Turkish Navy patrol vessels that have served past and present, from 10 July 1920 to present.

== Torpedo boats ==
=== Hamidiye-class ===
| Name | Builder | Launched | Commissioned | Fate |
|---|---|---|---|---|
| Yunus | (Kingdom of Italy) Ansaldo, Sestri Ponente, Genoa | 1901 | 1902 | Decommissioned 1929; Broken up 1935 |

=== Akhisar-class ===
| Name | Builder | Launched | Commissioned | Fate |
|---|---|---|---|---|
| Akhisar | (Kingdom of Italy) Ansaldo, Sestri Ponente, Genoa | 25 April 1904 | June 1904 | Stricken 1930; Scrapped 1935 |

=== Antalya-class ===
| Name | Builder | Launched | Commissioned | Fate |
|---|---|---|---|---|
| Draç | (Kingdom of Italy) Ansaldo, Sestri Ponente, Genoa | 1904 | 8 January 1907 | Decommissioned September 10, 1920; used as a work barge in 1926; Scrapped 1936 |
| Musul | (Kingdom of Italy) Ansaldo, Sestri Ponente, Genoa | 1904 | 1905 | Decommissioned 1929; Broken up 1936 |

=== Demirhisar-class ===
| Name | Builder | Launched | Commissioned | Fate |
|---|---|---|---|---|
| Sivrihisar | (Kingdom of Italy) Ansaldo, Sestri Ponente, Genoa | 1907 | 1907 | Decommissioned 1928; Broken up 1935 |
| Sultanhisar | (Kingdom of Italy) Ansaldo, Sestri Ponente, Genoa | 1907 | 1907 | Decommissioned 1928; Broken up 1935 |

Motor Torpedo Boats MTB-1 - MTB-10

== Patrol vessels ==
Harbour Defence Motor Launches: ML-1 - ML-7 - active as late as the early 1970s

Fairmile B motor launches: AB-1 - AB-8

=== Ex-US Auk class ===
Ex- Royal Navy Auk class:

| Name | Builder | Launched | Commissioned | Fate |
|---|---|---|---|---|
| TCG Çandarlı | (United States) Associated, Seattle, WA | Ex-HMS Frolic (J406) | March 1947 | converted to survey ship TCG Çandarlı (A-593) in the 1960s; stricken 1986 |
| TCG Çardak (M-507) | (United States) Gulf Shipbuilding Corporation, Chickasaw, AL | 4 October 1942 as Ex-HMS Tourmaline (J339) | March 1947 | decommissioned 1974 |
| TCG Çarşamba | (United States) Gulf Shipbuilding Corporation, Chickasaw, AL | 27 January 1943 as Ex-HMS Tattoo (J374) | March 1947 | converted to survey ship TCG Çarşamba (A-594), stricken 1985 |
| TCG Çeşme (M-505) | (United States) Associated, Seattle, WA | Ex-HMS Elfreda (J402) | 1947 | stricken 1974 |
| TCG Edincik (M-509) | (United States) Savannah Machine & Foundry, Savannah, GA | Ex-HMS Grecian (J352) | March 1947 | stricken 1974 |
| TCG Erdemit (M-512) | (United States) Associated, Seattle, WA | Ex-HMS Chance (J340) | March 1947 | stricken 1973 |
| TCG Erdemli | (United States) Associated, Seattle, WA | Ex-HMS Catherine (J12) | March 1947 | stricken 1963 |
| TCG Ereğli | (United States) Associated, Seattle, WA | Ex-HMS Pique (J23) | March 1947 | |

=== Ex-British Bathurst class ===
Ex- Royal Australian Navy Bathurst class corvette:

| Name | Builder | Launched | Acquired | Fate |
|---|---|---|---|---|
| TCG Alanya (M-501) | (Australia) Evans Deakin, Brisbane | 6 October 6 1941 as Ex-HMAS Broome (J191) | 1946 | Decommissioned 1975 |
| TCG Amasra (M-502) | (Australia) BHP, Whyalla | 3 December 1941 as Ex-HMAS Pirie (J189) | 21 May 1946 | Decommissioned 26 March 1984 |
| TCG Ayvalık | (Australia) BHP, Whyalla | 4 October 1941 as Ex-HMAS Gawler (J188) | 1946 | Decommissioned 1963 |
| TCG Antalya (M-500) | (Australia) Poole & Steel, Sydney | 16 August 1941 as Ex-HMAS Geraldton (J178) | 14 June 1946 | Renamed as TCG Ayvalık in 1963 after her sister ship (formerly HMAS Gawler); Decommissioned 1975 |
| TCG Ayancık (M-503) | (Australia) Evans Deakin, Brisbane | 30 June 1941 as Ex-HMAS Launceston (J179) | 21 May 1946 | renamed as Hamit Naci in 1965 & transferred to the Turkish Seamanship College |

=== Ex-British Bangor class ===
Ex- (Canada) Royal Canadian Navy Bangor-class minesweeper:

| Name | Builder | Launched | Acquired | Fate |
|---|---|---|---|---|
| TCG Bafra (P-121) | Dufferin, Toronto, Ontario | 1 October 1940 as Ex-HMCS Nipigon (J154) | 29 November 1957 | Discarded & scrapped 1972 |
| TCG Bandırma (P-129) | Port Arthur, Port Arthur, Ontario | 20 December 1941 as Ex-HMCS Kenora (J281) | 29 November 1957 | Discarded & scrapped 1972 |
| TCG Bartın (P-130) | Port Arthur, Port Arthur, Ontario | 17 April 1942 as Ex-HMCS Kentville (J312) | 29 November 1957 | Decommissioned & scrapped 1972 |
| TCG Beykoz (P-122) | Port Arthur, Port Arthur, Ontario | 14 May 1942 as Ex-HMCS Blairmore (J314) | 29 March 1958 | Discarded & scrapped 1971 |
| TCG Beylerbeyi (P-123) | North Van Ship Repair, North Vancouver, BC | 14 November 1940 as Ex-HMCS Mahone (J159) | 29 March 1958 | Discarded & scrapped 1972 |
| TCG Biga (P-124) | Canadian Vickers, Montreal, Quebec | 25 June 1941 as Ex-HMCS Medicine Hat (J256) | 29 November 1957 | Discarded & scrapped 1963 |
| TCG Bodrum (P-125) | Port Arthur, Port Arthur, Ontario | 30 December 1941 as Ex-HMCS Fort William (J311) | 29 November 1957 | Discarded & scrapped 1971 |
| TCG Bornova (P-126) | Davie Shipbuilding, Lévis, Quebec | 14 March 1942 as Ex-HMCS Westmount (J318) | 29 March 1958 | Discarded & scrapped 1972 |
| TCG Bozcaada (P-127) | Canadian Vickers, Montreal, Quebec | 29 May 1941 as Ex-HMCS Swift Current (J254) | 29 March 1958 | Discarded & scrapped 1971 |
| TCG Büyükdere (P-128) | Dufferin, Toronto, Ontario | 21 January 1942 as Ex-HMCS Sarnia (J309) | 29 March 1958 | Decommissioned & scrapped 1972 |

=== Ex-US PC type ===
Hisar class patrol boat (Ex- (United States) US Navy PC-1638-class submarine chaser):

| Name | Builder | Launched | Acquired | Fate |
|---|---|---|---|---|
| TCG Sultanhisar (P-111) | (United States) Gunderson, Portland, OR | 1963 as Ex-USS PC-1638 | 9 May 1964 | Decommissioned 3 June 2002 |
| TCG Demirhisar (P-112) | (United States) Gunderson, Portland, OR | 1964 as Ex-USS PC-1639 | | Unknown |
| TCG Yarhisar (P-113) | (United States) Gunderson, Portland, OR | 14 May 1964 as Ex-USS PC-1640 | 18 July 1965 | Decommissioned 2005; Museum ship at Yarhisar Naval Museum 2006 |
| TCG Akhisar (P-114) | (United States) Gunderson, Portland, OR | 14 May 1964 as Ex-USS PC-1641 | | Unknown |
| TCG Sivrihisar (P-115) | (United States) Gunderson, Portland, OR | 1964 as Ex-USS PC-1642 | | Unknown |
| TCG Koçhisar (P-116) | (United States) Gunderson, Portland, OR | December 1964 as Ex-USS PC-1643 (assembled at Gölcük?) | | Unknown |

=== Spanish Lazaga-class ===
Light version of Spanish Lazaga-class fast attack craft:

| Name | Builder | Launched | Commissioned | Fate |
|---|---|---|---|---|
| TCG Girne (P-140) | (Turkey) Taşkızak Naval Shipyard, Istanbul | | | |

=== Ex-US PGM-71 class ===
AB-21-class gunboat (Ex- (United States) US Navy PGM-71-class motor gunboat):

| Name | Builder | Launched | Acquired | Fate |
|---|---|---|---|---|
| TCG AB-21 (P-1221) | (United States) | Ex-USS PGM-104 | | |
| TCG AB-22 (P-1222) | (United States) | Ex-USS PGM-105 | | |
| TCG AB-23 (P-1223) | (United States) | Ex-USS PGM-106 | | |
| TCG AB-24 (P-1224) | (United States) | Ex-USS PGM-108 | | |

=== Ex-USCG 83-footer cutter type ===
Ex- USCG "83-footer" cutter type

| Name | Builder | Launched | Acquired | Fate |
|---|---|---|---|---|
| LS-9 | (United States) | | | P-339/P-1209/P-109 |
| LS-10 | (United States) | | | P-308/P-1210/P-110 |
| LS-11 | (United States) | | | P-309/P-1211/P-111 |
| LS-12 | (United States) | | | P-310/P-1212/P-112 |
| LS-13 | (United States) | | | |
| LS-14 | (United States) | | | |
| LS-15 | (United States) | | | |
| LS-16 | (United States) | | | |
| LS-17 | (United States) | | | |
| LS-18 | (United States) | | | |
| LS-19 | (United States) | | | |

=== AB-25 class ===
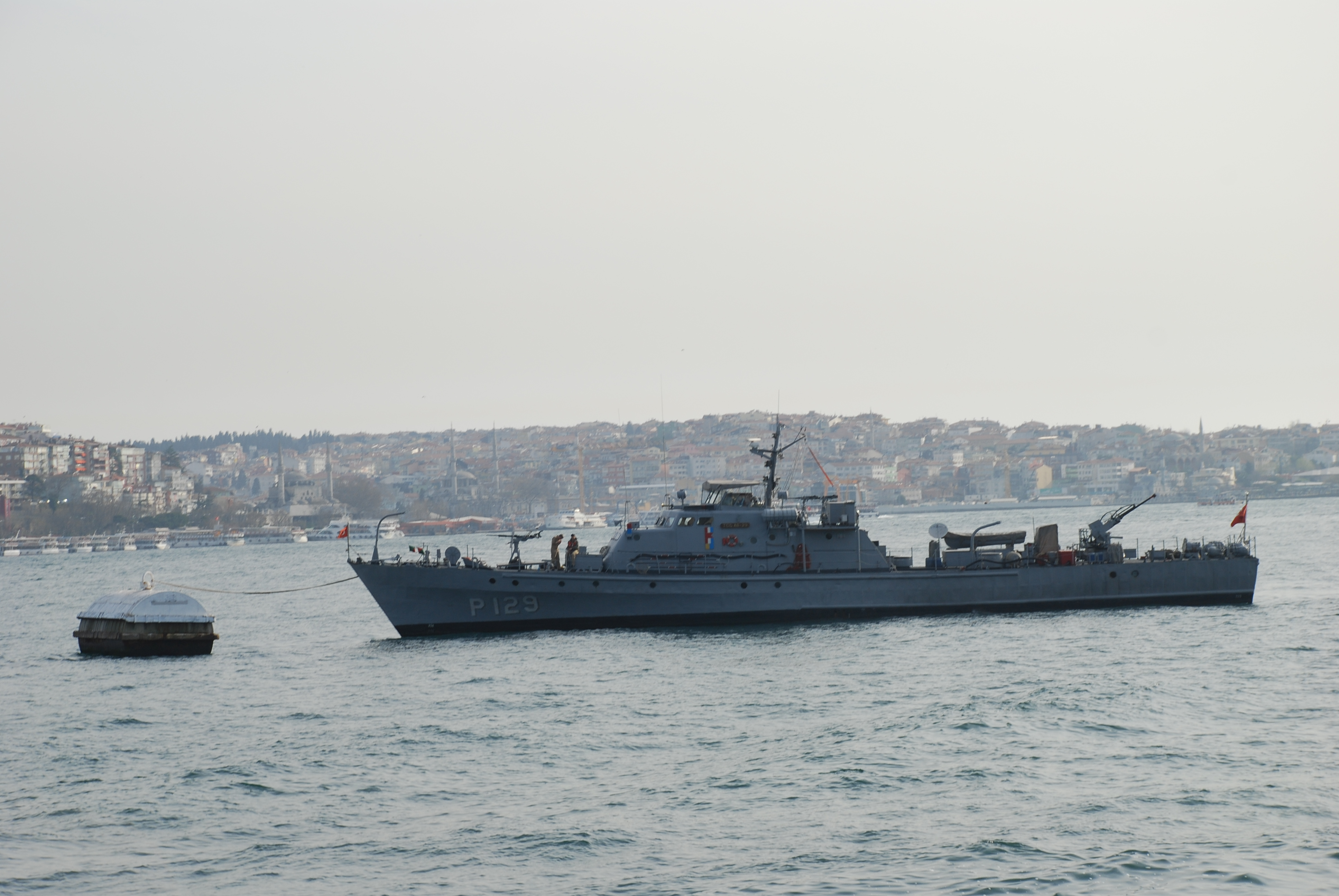
TCG AB-29

AB-25 class (Turkish type hunting boat):

| Name | Builder | Launched | Commissioned | Fate |
|---|---|---|---|---|
| TCG AB-25 (P-125) | (Turkey) Camialtı Shipyard, Istanbul | late 1960s | 1969 | out of service 2000 |
| TCG AB-26 (P-126) | (Turkey) Camialtı Shipyard, Istanbul | late 1960s-early 1970s | | transferred to Kazakhstan 1999 |
| TCG AB-27 (P-127) | (Turkey) Camialtı Shipyard, Istanbul | late 1960s-early 1970s | | active |
| TCG AB-28 (P-128) | (Turkey) Camialtı Shipyard, Istanbul | late 1960s-early 1970s | | active |
| TCG AB-29 (P-129) | (Turkey) Camialtı Shipyard, Istanbul | late 1960s-early 1970s | | active |
| TCG AB-30 (P-130) | (Turkey) Camialtı Shipyard, Istanbul | late 1960s-early 1970s | | transferred to Georgia 1998 |
| TCG AB-31 (P-131) | (Turkey) Camialtı Shipyard, Istanbul | late 1960s-early 1970s | | active |
| TCG AB-32 (P-132) | (Turkey) Camialtı Shipyard, Istanbul | late 1960s-early 1970s | | transferred to Kazakhstan 2001 |
| TCG AB-33 (P-133) | (Turkey) Camialtı Shipyard, Istanbul | late 1960s-early 1970s | | out of service 2002 |
| TCG AB-34 (P-134) | (Turkey) Camialtı Shipyard, Istanbul | late 1960s-early 1970s | | transferred to Azerbaijan 2000 |
| TCG AB-35 (P-135) | (Turkey) Camialtı Shipyard, Istanbul | late 1960s-early 1970s | | active |
| TCG AB-36 (P-136) | (Turkey) Camialtı Shipyard, Istanbul | late 1960s-early 1970s | | active |

=== New Type Patrol Boat ===
Tuzla-class patrol boat:

| Name | Builder | Launched | Commissioned | Fate |
|---|---|---|---|---|
| P-1200 | (Turkey) Dearsan Shipyard, Tuzla | 9 April 2010 | | active |

== Offshore patrol boats ==
=== Hisar-class ===
| Name | Builder | Launched | Acquired | Fate |
|---|---|---|---|---|
| Koçhisar | (Turkey) Istanbul Naval Shipyard | | 2026 | |

== Fast attack crafts ==
=== Doğan-class ===
Doğan class MAS:

| Name | Builder | Launched | Acquired | Fate |
|---|---|---|---|---|
| Doğan | (Kingdom of Italy) S.V.A.N. | 1926 | 1931 | 1940s |
| Martı | (Kingdom of Italy) S.V.A.N. | 1926 | 1931 | 1940s |
| Denizkuşu | (Kingdom of Italy) S.V.A.N. | 1926 | 1931 | 1940s |

Bora, Kasırga, Şimşek, Tayfun, Yıldırım

=== Ex-West German Nasty class ===
Ex-West German Nasty-class (Klasse 152)/Turkish Nasty-type patrol boat:

| Name | Builder | Launched | Acquired | Fate |
|---|---|---|---|---|
| TCG Doğan (P-327) | (Norway) Båtservice Verft, Mandal | Ex-P6191 Hugin | 1964 | Discarded 1973 |
| TCG Martı (P-328) | (Norway) Båtservice Verft, Mandal | Ex-P6192 Munin | 1964 | Discarded 1973 |

=== Ex-West German Jaguar class ===
Ex-West German Jaguar-class fast attack craft, Klasse 140:

| Name | Builder | Launched | Acquired | Fate |
|---|---|---|---|---|
| TCG Fırtına (P-330) | (Germany) Lürssen, Bremen-Vegesack | Ex-Pelikan (S-30) | 1974? | retired |
| TCG Tufan (P-331) | (Germany) Lürssen, Bremen-Vegesack | Ex-Storch (S-17) | 1974? | retired |
| TCG Kılıç (P-332) | (Germany) Lürssen, Bremen-Vegesack | Ex-Löwe (S-12) | 1975 | retired |
| TCG Mızrak (P-333) | (Germany) Lürssen, Bremen-Vegesack | Ex-Häher (S-18) | 1975? | retired |
| TCG Yıldız (P-334) | (Germany) Lürssen, Bremen-Vegesack | Ex-Tiger (S-23) | 1974? | retired |
| TCG Kalkan (P-335) | (Germany) Lürssen, Bremen-Vegesack | Ex-Wolf (S-3) | 1975 | retired |
| TCG Karayel (P-336) | (Germany) Lürssen, Bremen-Vegesack | Ex-Pinguin (S-22) | 1972? | converted to private yacht Sea Star, 2007? |

=== Kartal class ===
Kartal-class fast attack craft (ex (Germany) West German Zobel-class fast attack, Klasse 142):

| Name | Builder | Launched | Acquired | Fate |
|---|---|---|---|---|
| TCG Denizkuşu (P-321) | (Germany) Lürssen, Bremen-Vegesack | | 15 June 1968 | Active? |
| TCG Atmaca (P-322) | (Germany) Lürssen, Bremen-Vegesack | | 28 July 1967 | Active? |
| TCG Şahin (P-323) | (Germany) Lürssen, Bremen-Vegesack | | 19 July 1966 | Active? |
| TCG Kartal (P-324) | (Germany) Lürssen, Bremen-Vegesack | | 25 July 1966 | Active? |
| TCG Meltem (P-325) | (Germany) Lürssen, Bremen-Vegesack | | 25 October 1968 | Sunk in collision on 24 September 1985, then salvaged but not repaired |
| TCG Pelikan (P-326) | (Germany) Lürssen, Bremen-Vegesack | | 17 December 1969 | Active? |
| TCG Albatros (P-327) | (Germany) Lürssen, Bremen-Vegesack | | 7 February 1968 | Active? |
| TCG Şimsek (P-328) | (Germany) Lürssen, Bremen-Vegesack | | 22 July 1970 | Active? |
| TCG Kasırga (P-329) | (Germany) Lürssen, Bremen-Vegesack | | 23 October 1970 | Active? |

=== Ex-US Asheville class ===
Yıldırım-class fast attack craft (Ex- (United States) US Navy Asheville-class gunboat):

| Name | Builder | Launched | Acquired | Fate |
|---|---|---|---|---|
| TCG Yıldırım (P-338) | (United States) Peterson Builders, Sturgeon Bay, WI | 24 August 1968 as Ex-USS Defiance (PGM-95) | 11 June 1973 | sank off by an explosion & fire on 11 April 1985 off the coast Lesbos; stricken 6 July 1987 |
| TCG Bora (P-339) | (United States) Peterson Builders, Sturgeon Bay, WI | 7 December 1968 as Ex-USS Surprise (PGM-97) | 28 February 1973 | Sold to Turkey, June 1987 & stricken, 2000 |

=== Doğan class ===
Doğan-class fast attack craft (version of (Germany) Lürssen Werft FPB-57):

| Name | Builder | Launched | Commissioned | Fate |
|---|---|---|---|---|
| TCG Doğan (P-340) | (Germany) Lürssen | 16 June 1976 | 23 December 1977 | Active |
| TCG Martı (P-341) | (Turkey) | 28 July 1977 | 1 August 1978 | Decommissioned 2022 |
| TCG Tayfun (P-342) | (Turkey) | 19 July 1979 | 10 July 1980? | Active |
| TCG Volkan (P-343) | (Turkey) | 11 August 1980 | 12 May 1981 | Active |

=== Rüzgar class ===
Rüzgar-class fast attack craft (version of (Germany) Lürssen Werft FPB-57):

| Name | Builder | Launched | Commissioned | Fate |
|---|---|---|---|---|
| TCG Rüzgar (P-344) | (Turkey) | 1984 | 14 February 1986 | Active |
| TCG Poyraz (P-345) | (Turkey) | 17 December 1984 | 27 June 1987 | Active |
| TCG Gurbet (P-346) | (Turkey) | 24 July 1987 | 25 October 1987 | Active |
| TCG Fırtına (P-347) | (Turkey) | 30 April 1988 | 22 June 1988 | Active |

=== Yıldız class ===
Yıldız-class fast attack craft (version of (Germany) Lürssen Werft FPB-57):

| Name | Builder | Launched | Commissioned | Fate |
|---|---|---|---|---|
| TCG Yıldız (P-348) | (Turkey) Taşkisak Yard, Istanbul | | 3 June 1996 | Active |
| TCG Karayel (P-349) | (Turkey) Taşkisak Yard, Istanbul | 20 June 1995 | 19 September 1996 | Active |

=== Kılıç class ===
Kılıç-class fast attack craft ( (Germany) Lürssen Werft):

| Name | Builder | Launched | Commissioned | Fate |
|---|---|---|---|---|
| TCG Kılıç (P-330) | (Germany) Lürssen | | 1998? | Active |
| TCG Kalkan (P-331) | (Turkey) Gölcük Naval Shipyard, Gölcük, Kocaeli | | 1999 | Active |
| TCG Mızrak (P-332) | (Turkey) Gölcük Naval Shipyard, Gölcük, Kocaeli | | 2000 | Active |

=== Kılıç II class ===
Kılıç II-class fast attack craft ( (Germany) Lürssen Werft):

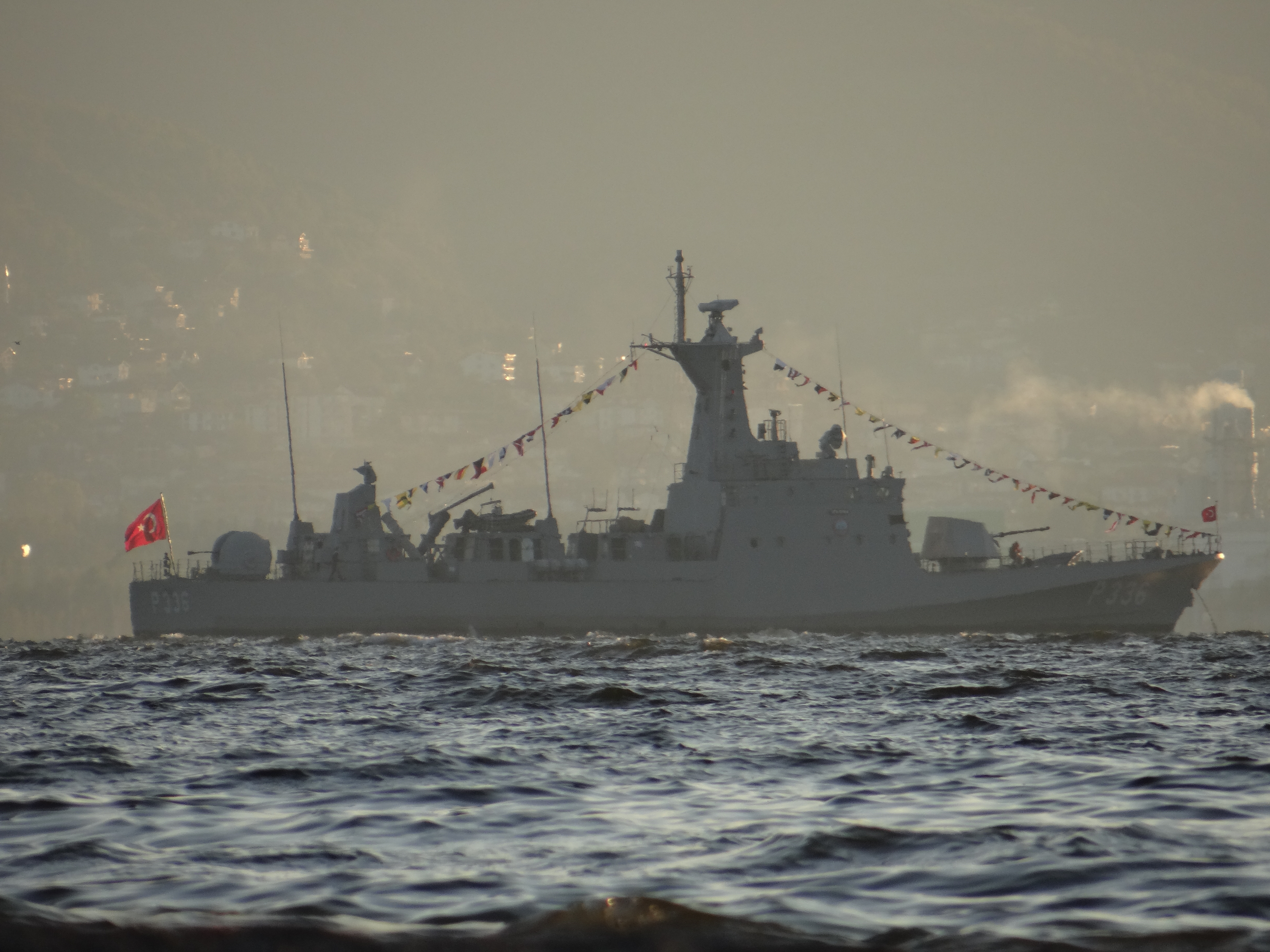
TCG Zıpkın (P-336)

| Name | Builder | Launched | Commissioned | Fate |
|---|---|---|---|---|
| TCG Tufan (P-333) | (Turkey) Gölcük Naval Shipyard, Gölcük, Kocaeli | | 2005 | Active |
| TCG Meltem (P-334) | (Turkey) Gölcük Naval Shipyard, Gölcük, Kocaeli | | 2005 | Active |
| TCG İmbat (P-335) | (Turkey) Gölcük Naval Shipyard, Gölcük, Kocaeli | | 2007 | Active |
| TCG Zıpkın (P-336) | (Turkey) Gölcük Naval Shipyard, Gölcük, Kocaeli | | 2007 | Active |
| TCG Atak (P-337) | (Turkey) Gölcük Naval Shipyard, Gölcük, Kocaeli | | 2009 | Active |
| TCG Bora (P-338) | (Turkey) Gölcük Naval Shipyard, Gölcük, Kocaeli | | 2010 | Active |
