= TCG Demirhisar =

Three ships of the Turkish Navy have borne the name Demirhisar:

- Ottoman torpedo boat Demirhisar was a torpedo boat launched in 1907 for service with the Ottoman Navy. Beached in 1915 and subsequently destroyed.
- TCG Demirhisar (H80) was a Demirhisar-class destroyer launched in 1941 and stricken in 1960.
- TCG Demirhisar (P-112) was a Hisar-class patrol boat, launched in 1964 as the submarine chaser USS PC-1639 of the US Navy. She was transferred to Turkey in 1964.
