= TCG Sultanhisar =

Three ships of the Turkish Navy have borne the name TCG Sultanhisar, after Sultanhisar, a town and a small district of Aydın Province, Turkey:

- Ottoman torpedo boat Sultanhisar was a torpedo boat launched in 1907 for service with the Ottoman Navy. She was transferred to the successor navy and struck in 1935.
- TCG Sultanhisar (1940) was a Demirhisar-class destroyer launched in 1940 and decommissioned in 1960.
- TCG Sultanhisar (P-111) was a Hisar-class patrol boat, formerly the submarine chaser USS PC-1638 of the US Navy. She was transferred to Turkey in 1964 and was decommissioned in 2002.
