= HMCS Nipigon =

Several Canadian naval units have been named HMCS Nipigon.

- HMCS Nipigon (J154) (I) was a Bangor-class minesweeper that served in the Second World War.
- HMCS Nipigon (DDH 266) (II) was an Annapolis-class destroyer that served during the Cold War.

== Battle honours ==
- Atlantic, 1941–45.
- Gulf of St. Lawrence 1942, 1944.
