= P124 =

P124 may refer to:

- Papyrus 124
- TCG Biga (P-124), a patrol boat of the Turkish Navy
- P124, a state regional road in Latvia
