= Naval Shipyards, York =

- York, Upper Canada
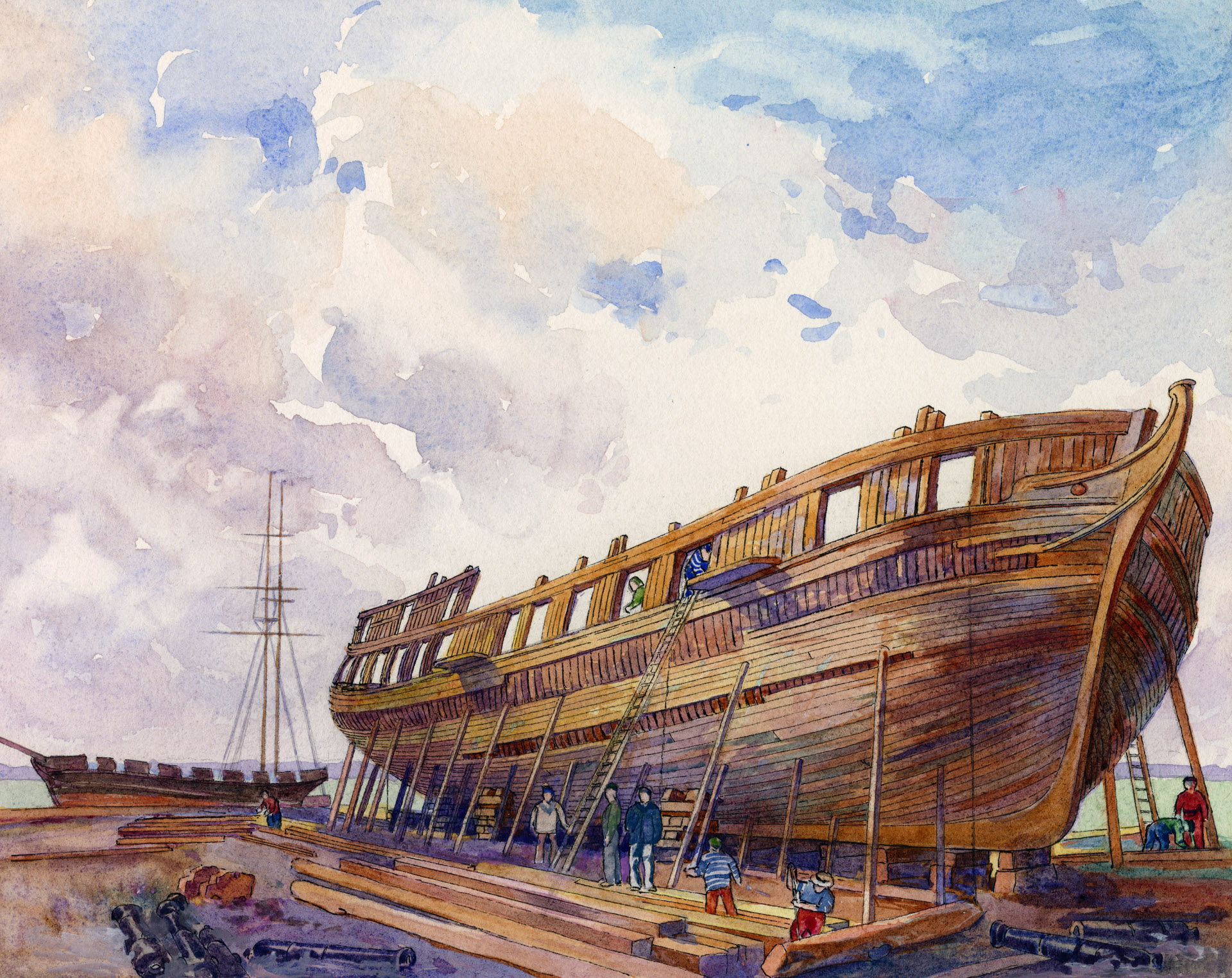
- Work on HMS Isaac Brock at the York Naval Shipyards, April 1813.

Site information
- Type: Shipyard
- Controlled by: Royal Navy

Location
- Coordinates: 43°38′35″N 79°22′51″W

Site history
- Built: 1793–1798
- In use: 1790s–1813
- Battles/wars: Battle of York

Garrison information
- Garrison: Fort York

The Naval Shipyards were naval shipbuilding facilities used by the Provincial Marine and the Royal Navy in York, Upper Canada (present day Toronto). The naval shipyards were ordered by the Lieutenant Governor of Upper Canada John Graves Simcoe in 1793, and were opened in 1798.

== History ==
The shipyards were called for by Lieutenant Governor John Graves Simcoe in 1793 and operated from 1798. The shipyards were situated on Humber Bay, near the western edge of the settlement (east of the ruins of Fort Rouille) and located south of Front Street on the shores of Lake Ontario west of Bay Street (today this is where the rail tracks south of Union Station are located). Ships were built along the sand shores using the trees from the forests inland and launched into Toronto Bay.

Several ships were built for the Provincial Marine and the Royal Navy during the 1810s, including the schooner Prince Regent in 1812 (later renamed HMS Beresford in 1813, as HMS Netley 1814 and finally base ship HMS Niagara; broken up 1843).

During the Battle of York, Major General Roger Hale Sheaffe dispatched Captain Tito LeLievre of the Royal Newfoundland Fencibles to the naval dockyards to set fire to the incomplete sloop-of-war HMS Isaac Brock. After the Battle of York, a naval squadron was stationed at York, and assisted with transporting wounded soldiers from the Niagara front to the medical hospital established at Fort York. However, although private shipbuilding resumed in York, the naval yards did not build any other navy ships after 1813 and abandoned and likely moved to a safer and more protected location in Kingston Royal Naval Dockyard.

== Post-military history ==
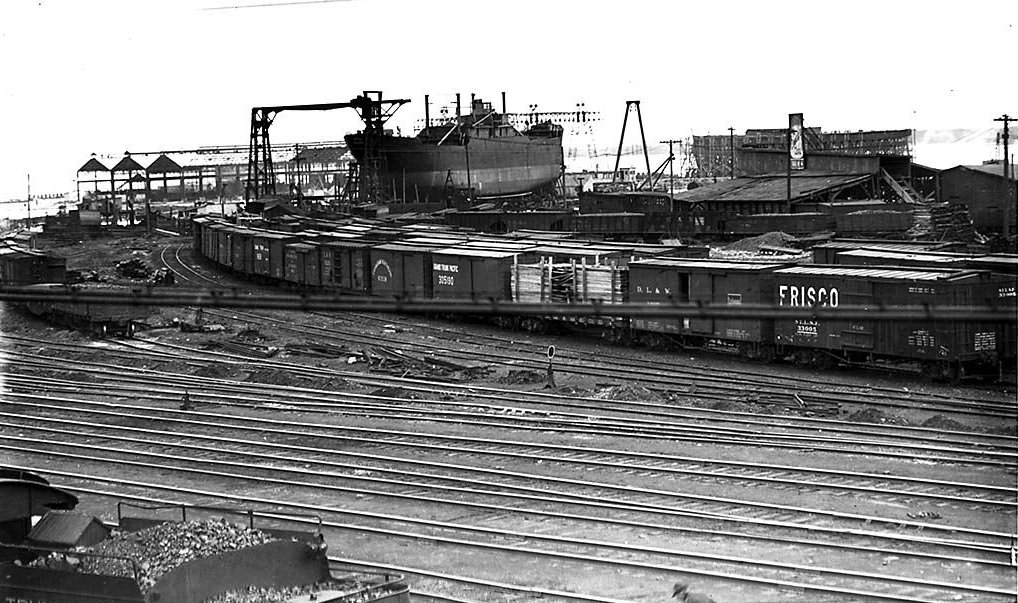
Ships under construction at the naval shipyards during World War I.

Numerous builders at mouth of Rouge River 1810–1856 After the War of 1812, shipbuilding yards in Toronto were typically held in private hands. Cooper's Wharf slip was another early 19th century shipbuilder in Toronto and remained in operations until 1845.

Polson Iron Works Limited was established in Toronto in 1883, was a major builder of steamers into the 1900s. Located at the foot of Sherbourne Street, Polson produced around 150 assorted vessels, including ten steel-hulled minesweepers for the Royal Canadian Navy and Royal Navy, and six cargo vessels during World War I. The company declared bankruptcy shortly after the end of the war and closed in 1919.

Several other ship builders were also based at the Bathurst Street Wharf. They include:

- Doty Engine Works 1890 new shipyard at Lakeshore and Spadina
- Bertram Engineering Works 1893 Doty yard changes owners
- Canadian Shipbuilding Company 1905 – acquired Bertram site but company fails by 1908
- Toronto Shipyards 1908 – took over from Canadian Shipbuilding and remains in operations until 1910
- Thor Iron Works 1913 – acquire vacant Toronto Shipyards
- Dominion Shipbuilding and Repair Company Limited 1917 – renamed from Thor and operated at both Spadina Avenue and Bathurst Street as well as Keating Channel building mostly cargo ships for Canadian and overseas buyers as well as yacht Oriole IV which later became HMCS Oriole; folded 1920 after strike with last two ships completed by Collingwood Shipyards

=== World War II ===
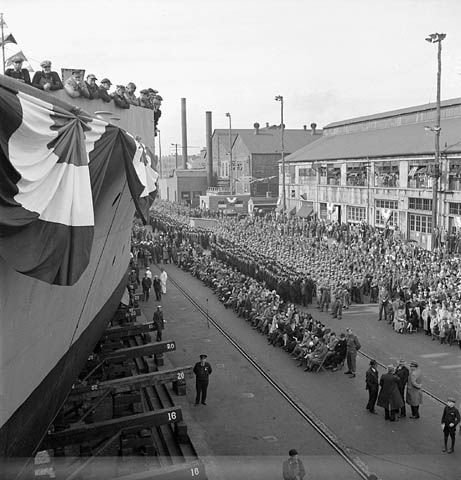
A ship launch at the Toronto shipyards for the 1,000th Canadian ship built during World War II, 1944.

In the 20th century, shipbuilding activity remained dormant (other than Toronto Drydock Company) until the start of World War II with demand for war ships. Several shipbuilding enterprises emerged including:

- Dufferin Shipbuilding Company 1940 – acquires Keating Channel site from the former Dominion Shipbuilding site
- Toronto Shipbuilding Company 1941 – renamed from Dufferin after take over by the Canadian government
- Redfern Construction Company 1943 – renamed from Toronto Shipbuilding and closed 1945

== See also ==
- Provincial Marine
- Navy Island Royal Naval Shipyard
- Amherstburg Royal Naval Dockyard
- Kingston Royal Naval Dockyard
