= TCG Alanya =

TCG Alanya is the name of the following ships of the Turkish Navy:

- TCG Alanya (M 501), ex-HMAS Broome (J191), a Bathurst-class corvette acquired in 1946 and decommissioned in 1975
- TCG Alanya (M 265), an A-class minehunter commissioned in 2005

== See also ==
- Alanya
