= Sultanhisar (disambiguation) =

Sultanhisar may refer to:

In geography

- Sultanhisar, a town and a small district of Aydın Province, Turkey

Ships

- Ottoman torpedo boat Sultanhisar, a torpedo boat of the Ottoman Navy
- TCG Sultanhisar, three ships of the Turkish Navy, including the above
