= P111 =

P111 may refer to:

== Vessels ==
- ARC Quitasueño (P-111), a patrol boat of the Colombian Navy
- ARM Ignacio Miguel Altamirano (P111), a patrol boat of the Mexican Navy
- TCG Sultanhisar (P-111), a patrol boat of the Turkish Navy

== Other uses ==
- Boulton Paul P.111, a British experimental aircraft
- Papyrus 111, a biblical manuscript
- Pentium III, a central processing unit
- Piaggio P.111, an Italian high-altitude research aircraft
- P111, a state regional road in Latvia
