= P115 =

P115 may refer to:

- ARM Felipe Xicoténcatl (P115), a patrol boat of the Mexican Navy
- Boulton Paul P.115, a British trainer aircraft
- BRM P115, a Formula One racing car
- Papyrus 115, a biblical manuscript
- TCG Sivrihisar (P-115), a patrol boat of the Turkish Navy
- USO1, general vesicular transport factor p115
- Yamaha P-115, a portable digital piano
- P115, a state regional road in Latvia
