= HMCS Sarnia =

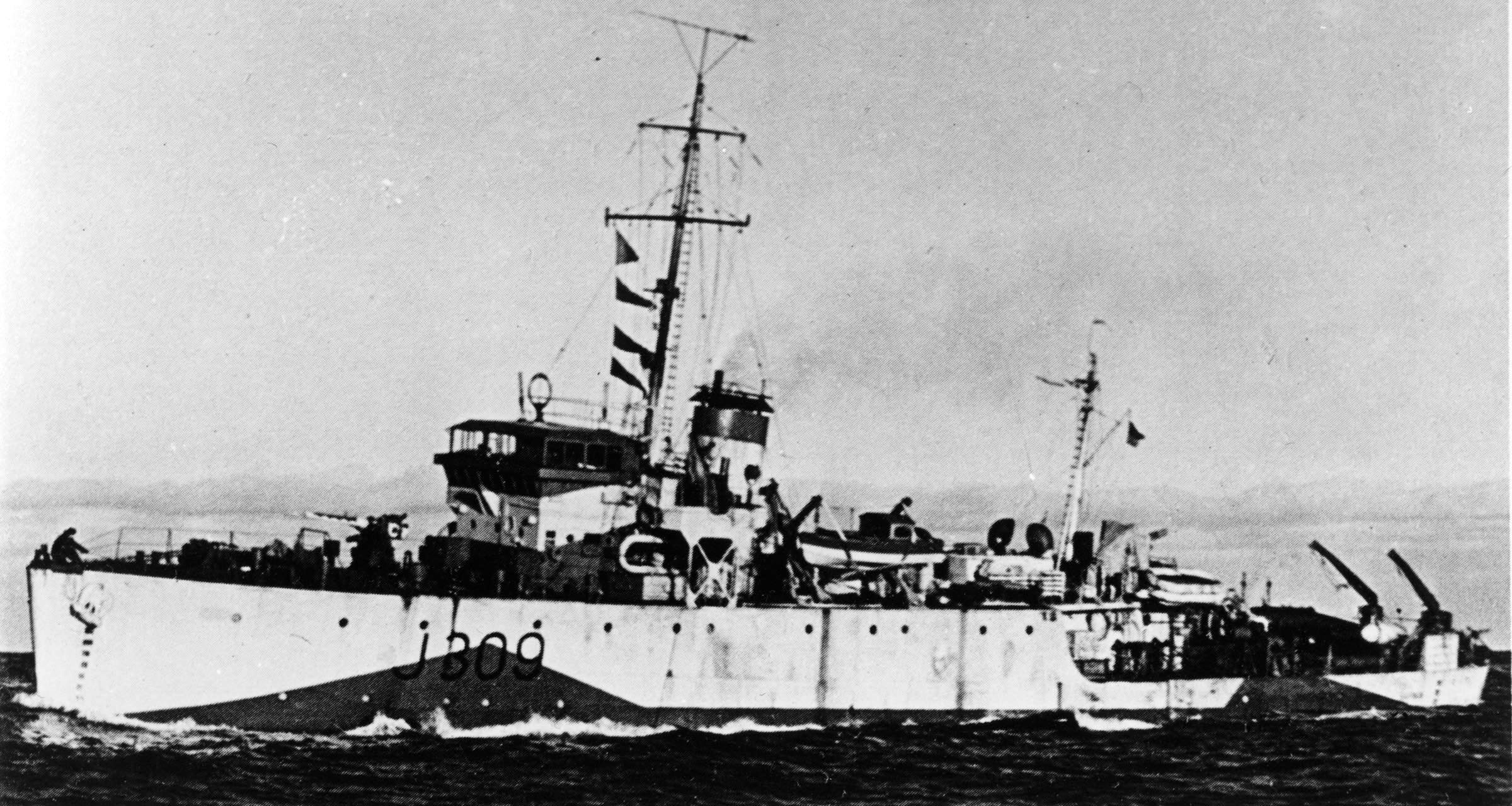

History

Canada
- Name: Sarnia
- Namesake: City of Sarnia
- Builder: Davie Shipbuilding, Lauzon (Note: Colledge and shipbuildinghistory.com both have Sarnia being built by Dufferin Shipbuilding Co., Toronto)
- Laid down: 18 September 1941
- Launched: 21 January 1942
- Commissioned: 13 August 1942
- Decommissioned: 28 October 1945
- Identification: Pennant number: J309
- Honours and awards: Atlantic 1942–43, Gulf of St. Lawrence 1942
- Fate: Sold to Turkey

Turkey
- Name: Büyükdere
- Acquired: 29 March 1958
- Decommissioned: 1972
- Identification: P-128
- Fate: Registry deleted 1972

General characteristics
- Class & type: Bangor-class minesweeper
- Displacement: 672 long tons (683 t)
- Length: 180 ft (54.9 m) oa
- Beam: 28 ft 6 in (8.7 m)
- Draught: 9 ft 9 in (3.0 m)
- Propulsion: 2 Admiralty 3-drum water tube boilers, 2 shafts, vertical triple-expansion reciprocating engines, 2,400 ihp (1,790 kW)
- Speed: 16.5 knots (31 km/h)
- Complement: 83
- Armament: 1 × 12-pounder (3 in (76 mm)) 12 cwt HA gun or QF 3-inch (76 mm) 20 cwt gun; 1 x QF 2 pdr Mark VIII; 2 × QF 20 mm Oerlikon guns; 40 depth charges as escort

HMCS Sarnia was a Bangor-class minesweeper that served in the Royal Canadian Navy during the Second World War. She saw action in the Battle of the Atlantic and the Battle of the St. Lawrence. She was named for Sarnia, Ontario. After the war she was refitted and transferred to the Turkish Naval Forces and renamed Büyükdere. She served with them until 1972.

== Design and description ==
A British design, the Bangor-class minesweepers was smaller than the preceding Halcyon-class minesweepers in British service, but larger than the Fundy class in Canadian service. They came in two versions powered by different engines; those with a diesel engines and those with vertical triple-expansion steam engines. Sarnia was of the latter design and was larger than her diesel-engined cousins. Sarnia was 180 feet (54.9 m) long overall, had a beam of 28 feet 6 inches (8.7 m) and a draught of 9 feet 9 inches (3.0 m). The minesweeper had a displacement of 672 long tons (683 t). She had a complement of 6 officers and 77 enlisted.

Sarnia had two vertical triple-expansion steam engines, each driving one shaft, using steam provided by two Admiralty three-drum boilers. The engines produced a total of 2,400 indicated horsepower (1,800 kW) and gave a maximum speed of 16.5 knots (30.6 km/h; 19.0 mph). The minesweeper could carry a maximum of 150 long tons (152 t) of fuel oil.

Sarnia was armed with a single quick-firing (QF) 3-inch (76 mm) 20 cwt gun mounted forward. (Note: "Cwt" is the abbreviation for hundredweight, 20 cwt referring to the weight of the gun.) The ship was also fitted with a QF 2-pounder Mark VIII aft and was eventually fitted with single-mounted QF 20 mm Oerlikon guns on the bridge wings. Those ships assigned to convoy duty had two depth charge launchers and four chutes to deploy the 40 depth charges they carried. Sarnia was equipped with LL and SA minesweeping gear to clear both magnetic and acoustic naval mines.

== Service history ==
Sarnia was ordered as part of the Royal Canadian Navy's 1941–42 shipbuilding programme. The minesweeper's keel was laid down on 18 September 1941 by Davie Shipbuilding and Repairing Co. Ltd. at Lauzon, Quebec. The ship was launched on 21 January 1942 and commissioned into the Royal Canadian Navy at Toronto on 13 August 1942.

After commissioning, Sarnia escorted a Quebec-Sydney convoy en route to Halifax. She was then assigned to Newfoundland Force and remained with the unit until September 1944. That September she underwent a major refit at Lunenburg. In late 1943, the ship was involved in two sabotage events. The investigation pointed to three engine room crew members but there was not enough evidence to press charges.

After returning to service and working up in Bermuda, Sarnia was assigned to Halifax Force and then Halifax Local Defence Force, remaining with this group until June 1945. On 15 April 1945, she rescued survivors from the torpedoed HMCS Esquimalt, which had been waiting for Sarnia in the Halifax Approaches. Sarnia unsuccessfully depth charged Esquimalt's attacker, U-190, after making contact with the submarine. After June she performed miscellaneous duties along the east coast until paid off on 28 October 1945 at Sydney and laid up at Shelburne.

=== Cold War service ===
Following the war, Sarnia was placed in strategic reserve at Sorel, Quebec. She was reacquired by the Royal Canadian Navy in 1951 and refitted. Her pennant number was changed to 190. Sarnia was the first Bangor-class minesweeper to finish her refit and was towed to Sydney, Nova Scotia and placed back in reserve. She was not recommissioned and was instead transferred to Turkey on 29 March 1958 and renamed Büyükdere. She served until 1972 when her registry was deleted. The ship was broken up in Turkey in 1972.

== See also ==
- List of ships of the Canadian Navy
