= German submarine U-190 =

German World War II submarine

Coordinates: 43.917°N 63.000°W

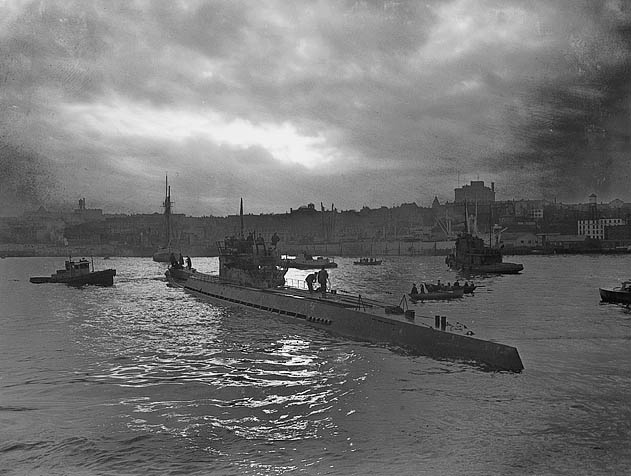
- U-190 in June 1945

History

Nazi Germany
- Name: U-190
- Ordered: 4 November 1940
- Builder: DeSchiMAG AG Weser, Bremen
- Yard number: 1036
- Laid down: 7 October 1941
- Launched: 8 June 1942
- Commissioned: 24 September 1942
- Fate: Surrendered to the Royal Canadian Navy, 14 May 1945

Canada
- Acquired: 14 May 1945
- Commissioned: 19 May 1945
- Decommissioned: 24 July 1947
- Fate: Sunk as a target, 21 October 1947

General characteristics
- Class & type: Type IXC/40 submarine
- Displacement: 1,144 t (1,126 long tons) surfaced; 1,257 t (1,237 long tons) submerged
- Length: 76.76 m (251 ft 10 in) o/a; 58.75 m (192 ft 9 in) pressure hull
- Beam: 6.86 m (22 ft 6 in) o/a; 4.44 m (14 ft 7 in) pressure hull
- Height: 9.60 m (31 ft 6 in)
- Draught: 4.67 m (15 ft 4 in)
- Installed power: 4,400 PS (3,200 kW; 4,300 bhp) (diesels); 1,000 PS (740 kW; 990 shp) (electric)
- Propulsion: 2 shafts; 2 × diesel engines; 2 × electric motors
- Speed: 18.3 knots (33.9 km/h; 21.1 mph) surfaced; 7.3 knots (13.5 km/h; 8.4 mph) submerged
- Range: 13,850 nmi (25,650 km; 15,940 mi) at 10 knots (19 km/h; 12 mph) surfaced; 63 nmi (117 km; 72 mi) at 4 knots (7.4 km/h; 4.6 mph) submerged
- Test depth: 230 m (750 ft)
- Complement: 4 officers, 44 enlisted
- Armament: 6 × torpedo tubes (4 bow, 2 stern); 22 × 53.3 cm (21 in) torpedoes; 1 × 10.5 cm (4.1 in) SK C/32 deck gun (180 rounds); 1 × 3.7 cm (1.5 in) SK C/30 AA gun; 1 × twin 2 cm FlaK 30 AA guns

Service record (Kriegsmarine)
- Part of: 4th U-boat Flotilla; 24 September 1942 – 28 February 1943; 2nd U-boat Flotilla; 1 March 1943 – 30 September 1944; 33rd U-boat Flotilla; 1 October 1944 – 1 May 1945
- Identification codes: M 49 098
- Commanders: Kptlt. Max Wintermeyer; 24 September 1942 – 5 July 1944; Oblt.z.S. Hans-Erwin Reith; 6 July 1944 – 14 May 1945
- Operations: 6 patrols: 1st patrol: 20 February – 30 March 1943; 2nd patrol: a. 1 May – 19 August 1943; b. 30 September – 1 October 1943; 3rd patrol: a. 7 October 1943 – 15 January 1944; b. 7 – 8 March 1944; c. 11 – 12 March 1944; 4th patrol: 16 March – 20 June 1944; 5th patrol: a. 17 August – 4 October 1944; b. 10 – 14 February 1945; 6th patrol: 19 February – 14 May 1945
- Victories: 1 merchant ship sunk (7,015 GRT); 1 warship sunk (590 tons)

German submarine U-190 was a Type IXC/40 U-boat of Nazi Germany's Kriegsmarine built for service during World War II.

Her keel was laid down on 7 October 1941 by DeSchiMAG AG Weser of Bremen. She was launched on 8 June 1942 and commissioned on 24 September 1942 with Kapitänleutnant Max Wintermeyer in command.

She carried out a total of six war patrols during which she sank two ships. On 6 July 1944 Wintermeyer was relieved by Oberleutnant zur See Hans-Erwin Reith who commanded the boat for the rest of her career in the Kriegsmarine.

After VE Day, she was surrendered to the Royal Canadian Navy, in which she served for two more years as HMCS U-190.

== Design ==
German Type IXC/40 submarines were slightly larger than the original Type IXCs. U-190 had a displacement of 1,144 tonnes (1,126 long tons) when at the surface and 1,257 tonnes (1,237 long tons) while submerged. The U-boat had a total length of 76.76 m (251 ft 10 in), a pressure hull length of 58.75 m (192 ft 9 in), a beam of 6.86 m (22 ft 6 in), a height of 9.60 m (31 ft 6 in), and a draught of 4.67 m (15 ft 4 in). The submarine was powered by two MAN M 9 V 40/46 supercharged four-stroke, nine-cylinder diesel engines producing a total of 4,400 metric horsepower (3,240 kW; 4,340 shp) for use while surfaced, two Siemens-Schuckert 2 GU 345/34 double-acting electric motors producing a total of 1,000 shaft horsepower (1,010 PS; 750 kW) for use while submerged. She had two shafts and two 1.92 m (6 ft) propellers. The boat was capable of operating at depths of up to 230 metres (750 ft).

The submarine had a maximum surface speed of 18.3 knots (33.9 km/h; 21.1 mph) and a maximum submerged speed of 7.3 knots (13.5 km/h; 8.4 mph). When submerged, the boat could operate for 63 nautical miles (117 km; 72 mi) at 4 knots (7.4 km/h; 4.6 mph); when surfaced, she could travel 13,850 nautical miles (25,650 km; 15,940 mi) at 10 knots (19 km/h; 12 mph). U-190 was fitted with six 53.3 cm (21 in) torpedo tubes (four fitted at the bow and two at the stern), 22 torpedoes, one 10.5 cm (4.13 in) SK C/32 naval gun, 180 rounds, and a 3.7 cm (1.5 in) SK C/30 as well as a 2 cm (0.79 in) C/30 anti-aircraft gun. The boat had a complement of 48.

== Armament ==
=== FLAK weaponry ===
U-190 was mounted with two 2cm Flak C38 in a M 43U Zwilling (meaning "twin") mount with short folding shield on the upper Wintergarten. The M 43U mount was used on a number of U-boats (U-249, U-250, U-278, U-337, U-475, U-853, U-1058, U-1109 U-1023, U-1105, U-1165 and U-1306).

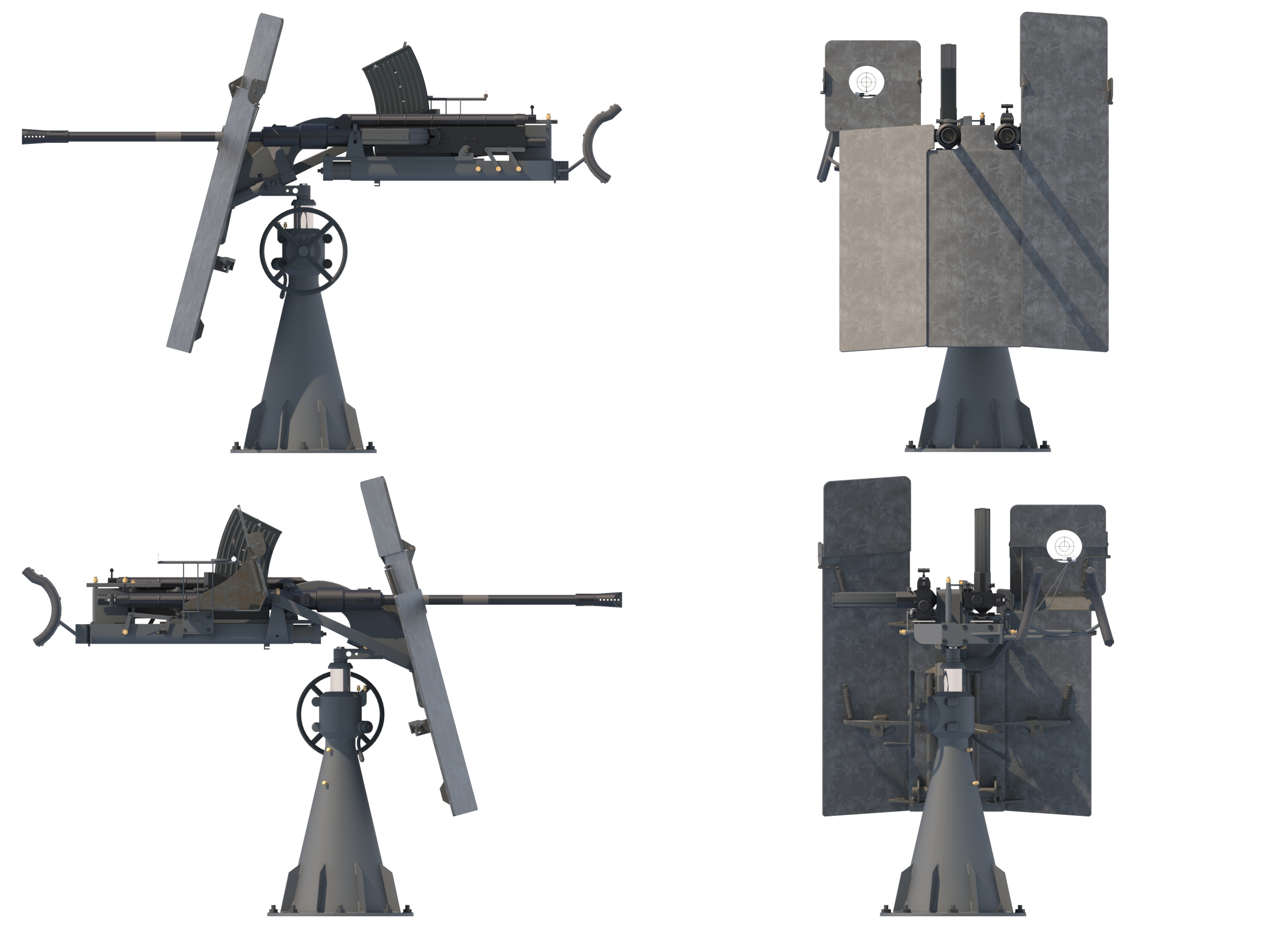
2 cm Flak C38 in a M 43U single mount with short folding shield. U-190 had a Zwilling - twin mount.

== Service history ==
U-190 conducted six war patrols, sinking two ships with a total of 7,015 GRT and 590 tons. The first was the 7,015 GRT British cargo ship Empire Lakeland, sunk off Rockall on 8 March 1943, one week into U-190's first operation. The next four patrols were unsuccessful.

=== Attack on William H. Webb ===
On 13 June 1943, U-190 attacked a convoy off the east coast of the United States, east of New York. The Liberty Ship William H. Webb was in the most dangerous convoy position (tail ship, outside starboard column), when U-190 fired a torpedo at the vessel, but the Liberty Ship was equipped with a special anti-torpedo mine, which detonated the torpedo 200 feet away from the ship, causing minor damage. The captain of U-190 would report to U-boat HQ in Germany that he had fired a torpedo, and that the ship had detonated the torpedo and proceeded apparently unhurt.

=== Sinking of HMCS Esquimalt ===
U-190's final war patrol began on 22 February 1945. She left Norway equipped with six contact and eight T-5 "GNAT" acoustic torpedoes. Her mission was to interdict Allied shipping off Sable Island and in the approaches to Halifax, Nova Scotia harbour. On 16 April she was keeping station off the Sambro light ship when her crew heard ASDIC (Sonar) pinging.

The minesweeper HMCS Esquimalt was conducting a routine patrol of the harbour. She was employing none of the mandatory anti-submarine precautions: she was not zig-zagging; she had not streamed her towed Foxer-type decoy, designed as a countermeasure against GNAT torpedoes; she had turned off her radar. Nonetheless, the U-boat crew was sure that they had been detected, and when Esquimalt turned toward them, U-190 turned to run and fired one GNAT from a stern tube.

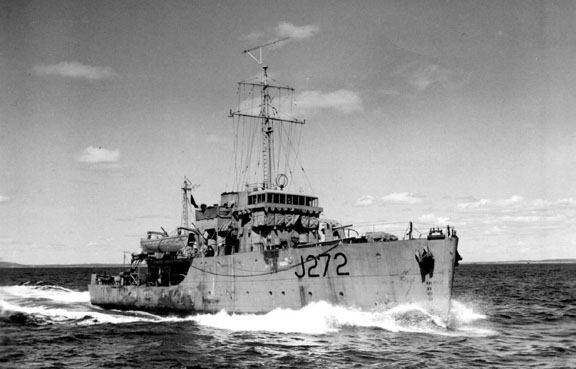
HMCS Esquimalt in 1944

The torpedo struck Esquimalt's starboard side. She sank within five minutes, the last Canadian vessel to be lost due to enemy action in World War II. While eight of her crew went down with her, the remainder survived the immediate disaster. Esquimalt sank so rapidly, however, that no distress signals were sent, and no one knew of the sinking until some eight hours later when HMCS Sarnia discovered the survivors. During the delay 44 crewmen had died of exposure, leaving only 26.

=== Surrender and the tour ===
U-190 escaped the area and remained on patrol off the North American east coast until she received Reichspräsident Karl Dönitz's 8 May order to surrender. The boat met the Canadian frigate HMCS Victoriaville 500 nautical miles (930 km; 580 mi) off Cape Race, Newfoundland, on 11 May. Reith signed a document of unconditional surrender and was taken prisoner with his crew aboard Victoriaville which escorted the submarine to Newfoundland. With the white ensign flying from her masthead, U-190 sailed under the command of Lieutenant F. S. Burbidge into Bay Bulls, Newfoundland, on 14 May. The prisoners were taken to Halifax.

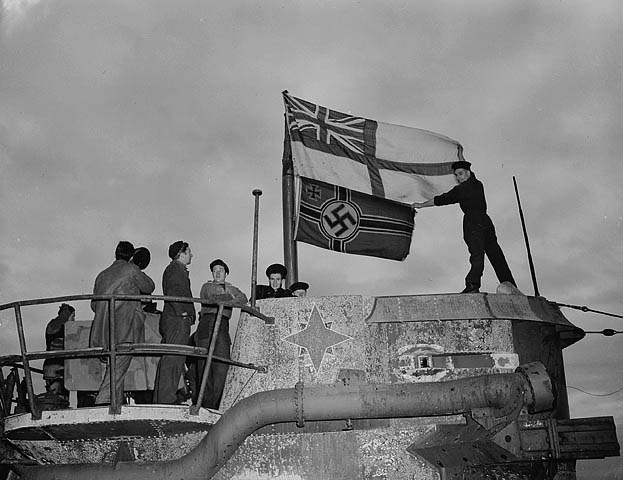
Canadian seamen raise the White Ensign over U-190 in St. John's, Newfoundland in 1945

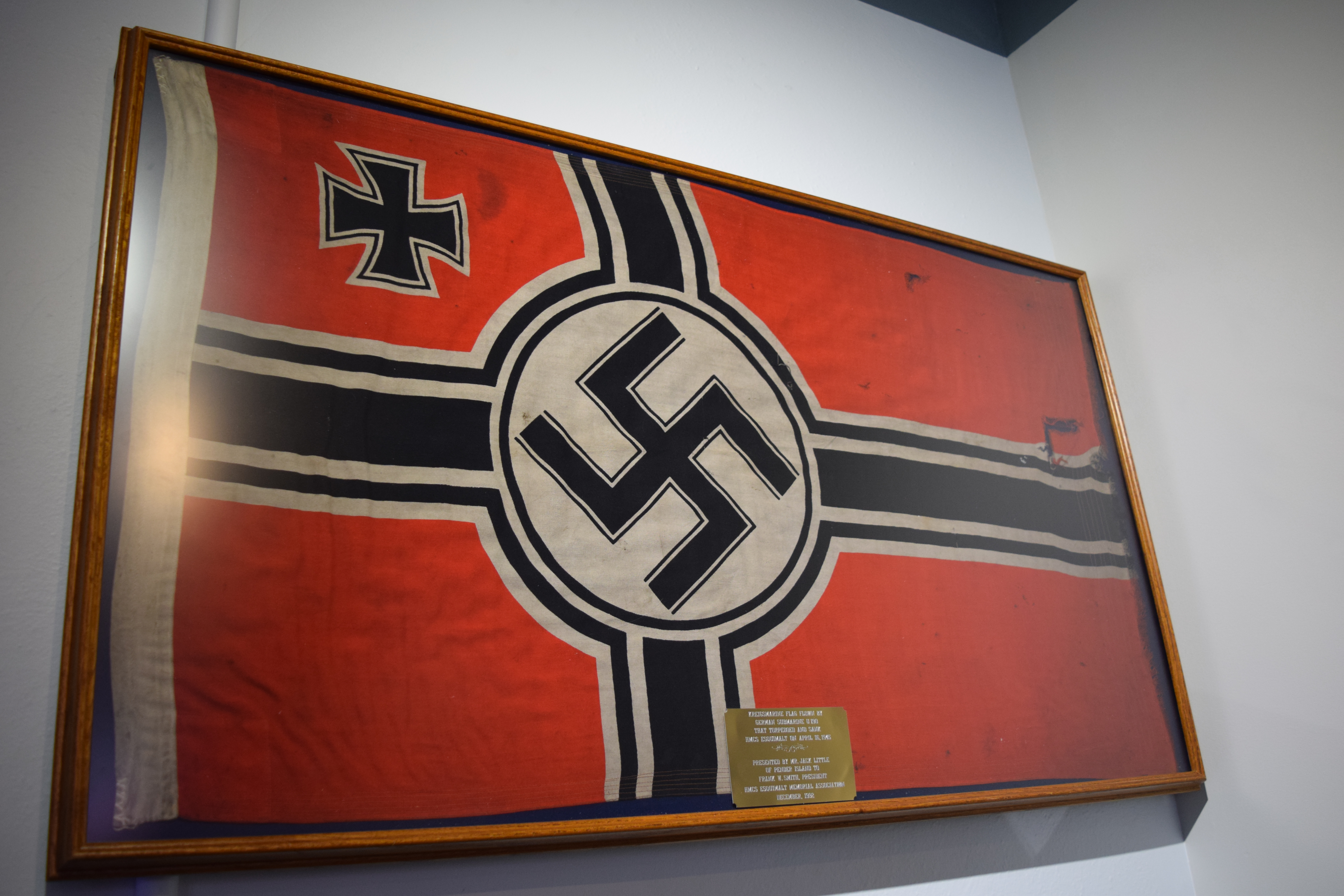
U-190's ensign today

U-190 was formally commissioned into the Royal Canadian Navy on 19 May. Her first assignment, in the summer of 1945, was a ceremonial tour of communities along the St. Lawrence River and Gulf of St. Lawrence, with stops in Montreal, Trois-Rivières, Quebec City, Gaspé, Pictou, and Sydney. On returning to Halifax she assumed duties as an anti-submarine training vessel, which she continued to fulfill for a year and a half.

=== Operation Scuttled ===
U-190 was paid off on 24 July 1947, but had one last mission to complete.

The official purpose of "Operation Scuttled" was to provide training for inexperienced post-war recruits in the art of combined operations. U-190, painted in lurid red and yellow stripes, was towed to the spot where she had sunk Esquimalt, and at precisely 11:00 hours on Trafalgar Day 1947, the fireworks began. The "exercise" called for a deliberately escalating firepower demonstration, beginning with airborne rockets and culminating in a destroyer bombardment with 4.7-inch guns and a hedgehog anti-submarine weapon providing the coup de grace.

While numerous reporters and photographers watched, and HMCS New Liskeard, Nootka, and Haida stood by awaiting their turn, the Naval Air Arm began the attack with eight Seafires, eight Fairey Fireflies, two Avro Ansons, and two Fairey Swordfish.

The first rocket attack struck home, and almost before the destroyers had a chance to train their guns, the U-boat was on the bottom of the ocean less than twenty minutes after the commencement of "Operation Scuttled."

=== Periscope and search ===
Before U-190 was sunk, her periscope had been salvaged. In 1963 it was installed at the Crow's Nest Officers Club in St. John's, Newfoundland. Many years of exposure to the weather damaged it to the point of uselessness, but it was overhauled and repaired; in a ceremony on 22 October 1998, it was "recommissioned" and is once again looking out at Water Street from the club. Original shipment of the periscope had been affected by Commodore Edward N. "Cookie" Clarke from HMC Dockyard, Halifax, where it had been in storage, to the Crow's Nest where Cookie had been a member during the war. U-190 suffered no casualties from her crews during her career.

An 18 January 2006 article in the Edmonton Journal reported that a team of divers planned to search for U-190 and another U-boat, U-520.

== Summary of raiding history ==
Date	Ship	Nationality	Tonnage (Note: Merchant ship tonnages are in gross register tons. Military vessels are listed by tons displacement.)	Fate
8 March 1943	Empire Lakeland	United Kingdom	7,015	Sunk
16 April 1945	HMCS Esquimalt	Royal Canadian Navy	590	Sunk

== See also ==
- German submarine U-889
- List of ships of the Canadian Navy

== Bibliography ==
- Busch, Rainer; Röll, Hans-Joachim (1999). German U-boat commanders of World War II : a biographical dictionary. Translated by Brooks, Geoffrey. London, Annapolis, Md: Greenhill Books, Naval Institute Press. ISBN 1-55750-186-6.
- Gröner, Erich; Jung, Dieter; Maass, Martin (1991). U-boats and Mine Warfare Vessels. German Warships 1815–1945. Vol. 2. Translated by Thomas, Keith; Magowan, Rachel. London: Conway Maritime Press. ISBN 0-85177-593-4.
