= HMCS Kentville =

1942 Royal Canadian Navy minesweeper

History

Canada
- Name: Kentville
- Namesake: Kentville, Nova Scotia
- Builder: Port Arthur Shipbuilding Co., Port Arthur
- Laid down: 15 December 1941
- Launched: 17 April 1942
- Commissioned: 10 October 1942
- Decommissioned: 28 October 1945
- Identification: Pennant number:J312
- Recommissioned: 1954
- Decommissioned: 30 September 1954
- Identification: pennant number: 182
- Honours and awards: Atlantic 1944–45 (Note: Kentville served in the Battle of the St. Lawrence, but did not earn a battle honour.)
- Fate: Transferred to Turkish Navy, 1957

Turkey
- Name: Bartin
- Acquired: 29 November 1957
- Commissioned: 1957
- Decommissioned: 1972
- Identification: P-130
- Fate: Registry deleted 1980

General characteristics
- Class & type: Bangor-class minesweeper
- Displacement: 672 long tons (683 t)
- Length: 180 ft (54.9 m) oa
- Beam: 28 ft 6 in (8.7 m)
- Draught: 9 ft 9 in (3.0 m)
- Propulsion: 2 Admiralty 3-drum water tube boilers, 2 shafts, vertical triple-expansion reciprocating engines, 2,400 ihp (1,790 kW)
- Speed: 16.5 knots (31 km/h)
- Complement: 83
- Armament: 1 × 12-pounder (3 in (76 mm)) 12 cwt HA gun or QF 3-inch (76 mm) 20 cwt gun; 1 x QF 2 pdr Mark VIII; 2 × QF 20 mm Oerlikon guns; 40 depth charges as escort

HMCS Kentville was a Bangor-class minesweeper that served in the Royal Canadian Navy during the Second World War. She saw action in the Battle of the Atlantic. She was named for Kentville, Nova Scotia. After the war she was recommissioned for a short period with the Royal Canadian Navy before being sold to Turkey in 1957 and renamed Bartin. She served with the Turkish Naval Forces until 1972.

== Design and description ==
A British design, the Bangor-class minesweepers were smaller than the preceding Halcyon-class minesweepers in British service, but larger than the Fundy class in Canadian service. They came in two versions powered by different engines; those with a diesel engines and those with vertical triple-expansion steam engines. Kentville was of the latter design and was larger than her diesel-engined cousins. Kentville was 180 feet (54.9 m) long overall, had a beam of 28 feet 6 inches (8.7 m) and a draught of 9 feet 9 inches (3.0 m). The minesweeper had a displacement of 672 long tons (683 t). She had a complement of 6 officers and 77 enlisted.

Kentville had two vertical triple-expansion steam engines, each driving one shaft, using steam provided by two Admiralty three-drum boilers. The engines produced a total of 2,400 indicated horsepower (1,800 kW) and gave a maximum speed of 16.5 knots (30.6 km/h; 19.0 mph). The minesweeper could carry a maximum of 150 long tons (152 t) of fuel oil.

Kentville was armed with a single quick-firing (QF) 12-pounder (3 in (76 mm)) 12 cwt HA gun mounted forward. (Note: "Cwt" is the abbreviation for hundredweight, 20 cwt referring to the weight of the gun.) The ships were also fitted with a QF 2-pounder Mark VIII aft and were eventually fitted with single-mounted QF 20 mm Oerlikon guns on the bridge wings. Those ships assigned to convoy duty had two depth charge launchers and four chutes to deploy the 40 depth charges they carried.

== Service history ==
Kentville was ordered as part of the 1941–42 programme of minesweeper production. The minesweeper's keel was laid down on 15 December 1941 by Port Arthur Shipbuilding Co at Port Arthur, Ontario. The ship was launched on 17 April 1942 and was commissioned into the Royal Canadian Navy on 10 October 1942 with pennant number J146 at Port Arthur.

After escorting a coastal convoy en route to Halifax, Kentville was assigned to Halifax Force in January 1943 after working up. She spent the majority of her war service working out of Halifax. In May 1943 she was assigned to Sydney Force, working out of Sydney, Nova Scotia. Her duties involved escorting coastal convoys in Atlantic Canada. She remained with the group until November 1943, when she transferred back to Halifax.

During the course of her duties, she rescued the freighter Imperial Monarch in distress from heavy weather and the tugboat Foundation Franklin. In May 1944, Kentville underwent a refit at Charlottetown, completing in July and working up in Bermuda until August. She returned to Halifax following workups and resumed her duties.

Kentville saw enemy action in January 1945 when she defended her convoy against submarine attacks which sank two merchant ships. During the war her crew often took leave in her namesake town of Kentville. On 14 January 1945 she picked up five survivors from the freighter Polarland, which had been sunk by U-1232. In April 1945, Kentville was one of four ships sent to hunt down the U-boat that had sunk HMCS Esquimalt. The search was unsuccessful. She was paid off at Sydney on 28 October 1945 and placed in reserve at Shelburne.

=== Postwar service ===
In 1946, Kentville was moved to Sorel, Quebec to be placed in strategic reserve. She was briefly recommissioned in 1954 under pennant number 182. After being mothballed again later that year, she was transferred to Turkey in 1957 where she was renamed Bartin and served until 1972. The ship was broken up in 1972. Her registry was deleted in 1980. Today her bell is preserved at the Kings County Museum in Kentville.

== See also ==
- List of ships of the Canadian Navy
