= USS PC-1643 =

Patrol boat of the US Navy

History

United States
- Name: PC-1643
- Builder: Gunderson Brothers Engineering Corp., Portland
- Laid down: 1963
- Launched: December 1964
- Commissioned: July 1965
- Fate: Transferred to Turkish Navy

Turkey
- Name: Koçhisar
- Namesake: Koçhisar
- Identification: Callsign: TBLR; Pennant number: P 116
- Status: Unknown

General characteristics
- Class & type: PC-1638-class submarine chaser; Hisar-class patrol boat
- Displacement: 295 tons (full load)
- Length: 175 ft (53 m)
- Beam: 23 ft (7.0 m)
- Draft: 10 ft 10 in (3.30 m)
- Propulsion: 2 x 2,400hp ALCO 169X 10AT diesel engines; 2 shafts
- Speed: 20 knots (37 km/h)
- Complement: 59
- Armament: 1 x Mk 15 ASW Hedgehog mortar; 1 × 40 mm gun; 3 × 20 mm cannons; 2 rocket launchers; 4 depth charge projectiles; 2 depth charge tracks

USS PC-1643 was an PC-1638-class submarine chaser in the United States Navy during the Cold War. She was transferred to the Turkish Navy as TCG Koçhisar (P-116) of the Hisar-class patrol boat.

== Construction and commissioning ==
PC-1642 was laid down in 1963 at Gunderson Brothers Engineering Corps., Portland, Oregon. Launched in December 1964.

She was transferred to the Turkish Navy and renamed TCG Koçhisar (P-116).
