= HMCS Esquimalt =

Royal Canadian minesweeper

Coordinates: 44°28′N 63°10′W

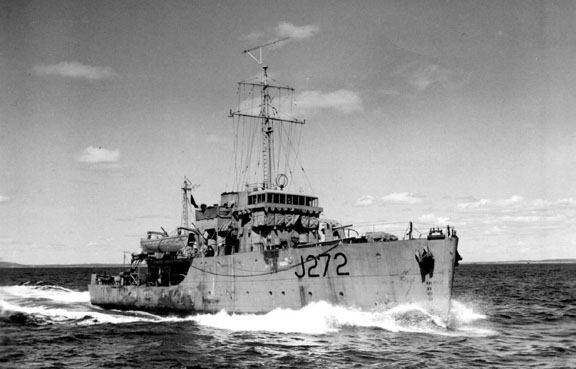
- HMCS Esquimalt

History

Canada
- Name: Esquimalt
- Namesake: Township of Esquimalt
- Builder: Marine Industries Ltd., Sorel
- Laid down: 20 December 1940
- Launched: 8 August 1941
- Commissioned: 26 October 1942
- Identification: Pennant number: J272
- Honours and awards: Atlantic 1943–44, Gulf of St. Lawrence 1942.
- Fate: Sunk 16 April 1945

General characteristics
- Class & type: Bangor-class minesweeper
- Displacement: 592 long tons (601 t)
- Length: 162 ft (49.4 m)
- Beam: 28 ft (8.5 m)
- Draught: 8.25 ft (2.51 m)
- Propulsion: 2 shafts, 9-cylinder diesel, 2,000 bhp (1,500 kW)
- Speed: 16 knots (30 km/h)
- Complement: 83
- Armament: 1 × QF 12-pounder 12 cwt naval gun; 1 × QF 2-pounder Mark VIII; 2 × QF 20 mm Oerlikon guns; 40 depth charges as escort

HMCS Esquimalt was a Bangor-class minesweeper that served in the Royal Canadian Navy during the Second World War. She saw service in the Battle of the Atlantic and in the Battle of the St. Lawrence. She was sunk in 1945, the last Canadian warship to suffer that fate. She was named for Esquimalt, British Columbia.

== Design and description ==
The Bangor class was initially to be a scaled down minesweeper design of the Halcyon class in Royal Navy service. However, due to the difficulty procuring diesel engines led to the small number of the diesel version being completed. The ships displaced 592 long tons (601 t) standard and 690 long tons (701 t) fully loaded. They were 162 feet (49.4 m) long with a beam of 28 feet (8.5 m) and a draught of 8 feet 3 inches (2.51 m). However, the size of the ship led to criticisms of their being too cramped for magnetic or acoustic minesweeping gear. This may have been due to all the additions made during the war with the installation of ASDIC, radar and depth charges.

The Bangor class came in two versions. Esquimalt was of the diesel-powered version, being equipped with a 9-cylinder diesel engine driving two shafts that produced 2,000 brake horsepower (1,500 kW). This gave the ship a maximum speed of 16.5 knots (30.6 km/h). The vessels carried 65 long tons (66 t) of oil. The vessels had a complement of 6 officers and 77 ratings.

The Canadian diesel-powered Bangors were armed with a single quick-firing (QF) 12-pounder 12 cwt gun mounted forward. (Note: "Cwt" is the abbreviation for hundredweight, 20 cwt referring to the weight of the gun.) Initially the design called for a 4-inch (102 mm) gun, however these were replaced with 12-pounder guns. The ships were also fitted with a QF 2-pounder Mark VIII gun aft and were eventually fitted with single-mounted QF 20 mm Oerlikon guns on the bridge wings. For those ships assigned to convoy duty, they were armed with two depth charge launchers and two chutes to deploy the 40 depth charges they carried.

== Service history ==
Esquimalt was ordered as part of the 1940–41 building programme. The minesweeper's keel was laid down on 20 December 1940 by Marine Industries Ltd. at Sorel, Quebec. The ship was launched on 8 August 1941 and was commissioned into the Royal Canadian Navy on 26 October 1942 at Sorel with the pennant number J272.

After arriving at Halifax in November 1942, Esquimalt required constant attention by the dockyard as the vessel had a series of mechanical problems, undergoing two periods of repair in March and May 1943. She was then assigned to Newfoundland Force for local patrol duties. In September 1944 she transferred to the Halifax Local Defence Force.

Late that month, Esquimalt underwent a three-month refit at Halifax. She returned to duty with the Halifax Local Defence Force and remained with them until 16 April 1945. On that day, she was torpedoed and sunk a few miles off Chebucto Head, Nova Scotia by U-190, becoming the last Canadian warship lost to enemy action in the war.

=== Last patrol ===
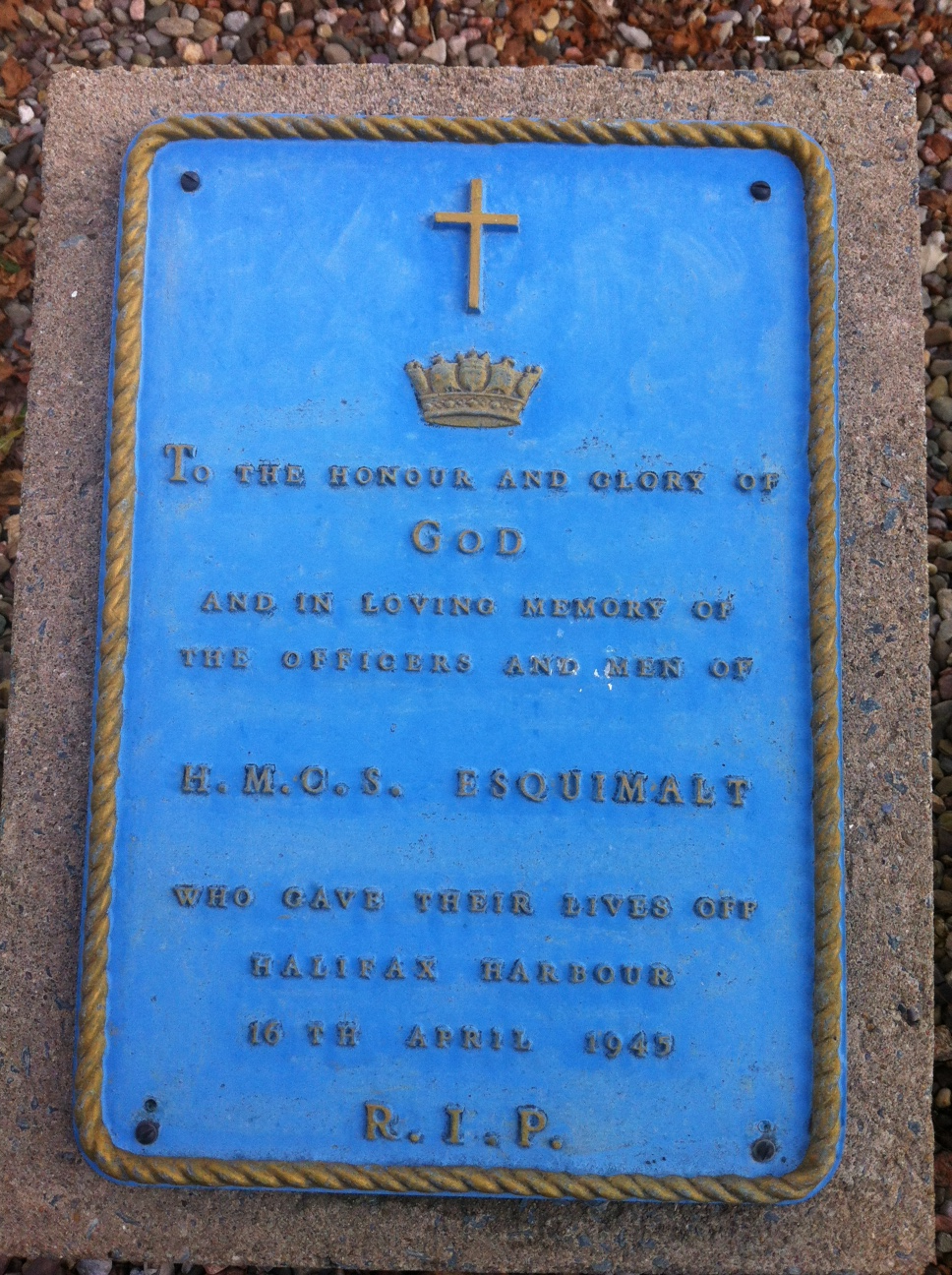
HMCS Esquimalt memorial plaque at CFB Halifax

On the evening of 15 April 1945, Esquimalt sailed from Halifax to go on an anti-submarine patrol in the harbour approaches and then to rendezvous with HMCS Sarnia. She was employing none of the mandatory anti-submarine precautions: she was not zig-zagging; she had not streamed her towed Foxer-type decoy, designed as a countermeasure against GNAT torpedoes; she had turned off her radar. In the early morning of 16 April she was attacked by U-190, a German U-boat that had been operating around Halifax since early April. U-190's torpedo struck Esquimalt's starboard side engine room with the explosion knocking out the onboard power instantly, preventing any distress signal being sent. She started to list heavily to starboard pushing the lifeboat under water, but the crew managed to get four Carley floats clear of the ship. Esquimalt sank in less than five minutes. Because of the lack of distress calls or signals from Esquimalt, and the unfortunate timing of the attack itself, any rescue effort was substantially delayed which resulted in many men losing their lives to exposure. The crew was adrift on the Carley floats in frigid waters with only light clothing for about six hours. Forty-four men died from exposure, eight died in the sinking, leaving 26 survivors. (Note: Fisher claims forty-four men died from the sinking.) The remaining crew members were rescued with the arrival of Sarnia, who unsuccessfully attacked U-190 after making contact with the submarine. Two Fairmile B motor launches later sent to patrol the area of the sinking depth charged the wreck of Esquimalt, mistakenly believing it to be a submarine.

== See also ==
- List of ships of the Canadian Navy
- History of the Royal Canadian Navy
