= HMCS Fort William (J311) =

Royal Canadian Navy minesweeper

History

Canada
- Name: Fort William
- Namesake: Fort William, Ontario
- Builder: Port Arthur Shipbuilding Co., Port Arthur
- Laid down: 18 August 1941
- Launched: 30 December 1941
- Commissioned: 25 August 1942
- Decommissioned: 23 October 1945
- Identification: Pennant number: J311
- Honours and awards: Gulf of St. Lawrence 1942, Atlantic 1943, Normandy 1944
- Fate: Transferred to Turkish Navy 1957

Turkey
- Name: Bodrum
- Acquired: 29 November 1957
- Fate: Discarded 1971

General characteristics
- Class & type: Bangor-class minesweeper
- Displacement: 672 long tons (683 t)
- Length: 180 ft (54.9 m) oa
- Beam: 28 ft 6 in (8.7 m)
- Draught: 9 ft 9 in (3.0 m)
- Propulsion: 2 Admiralty 3-drum water tube boilers, 2 shafts, vertical triple-expansion reciprocating engines, 2,400 ihp (1,790 kW)
- Speed: 16.5 knots (31 km/h)
- Complement: 83
- Armament: 1 × 12-pounder (3 in (76 mm)) 12 cwt HA gun; 1 x QF 2 pdr Mark VIII; 2 × QF 20 mm Oerlikon guns; 40 depth charges as escort

HMCS Fort William (pennant J311) was a Bangor-class minesweeper that served with the Royal Canadian Navy during the Second World War. Entering service in 1942, the minesweeper participated in the Battle of the Atlantic as a convoy escort and in the invasion of Normandy. Following the war, the ship was laid up, but was reacquired during the Korean War. Fort William never re-entered service with the Royal Canadian Navy and in 1957, was sold to Turkey. Renamed Bodrum by the Turkish Navy, the ship was discarded in 1971.

== Design and description ==
A British design, the Bangor-class minesweepers were smaller than the preceding Halcyon-class minesweepers in British service, but larger than the Fundy class in Canadian service. They came in two versions powered by different engines; those with a diesel engines and those with vertical triple-expansion steam engines. Fort William was of the latter design and was larger than her diesel-engined cousins. The minesweeper was 180 feet (54.9 m) long overall, had a beam of 28 feet 6 inches (8.7 m) and a draught of 9 feet 9 inches (3.0 m). Fort William had a displacement of 672 long tons (683 t). She had a complement of 6 officers and 77 enlisted.

Fort William had two vertical triple-expansion steam engines, each driving one shaft, using steam provided by two Admiralty three-drum boilers. The engines produced a total of 2,400 indicated horsepower (1,800 kW) and gave a maximum speed of 16.5 knots (30.6 km/h; 19.0 mph). The minesweeper could carry a maximum of 150 long tons (152 t) of fuel oil.

Fort William was armed with a single quick-firing (QF) 12-pounder (3 in (76 mm)) 12 cwt HA gun mounted forward. (Note: "Cwt" is the abbreviation for hundredweight, 20 cwt referring to the weight of the gun.) The ship was also fitted with a QF 2-pounder Mark VIII aft and were eventually fitted with single-mounted QF 20 mm Oerlikon guns on the bridge wings. The 2-pounder gun was later replaced with a twin 20 mm Oerlikon mount. Those ships assigned to convoy duty had two depth charge launchers and four chutes to deploy the 40 depth charges they carried.

== Operational history ==
The minesweeper was ordered as part of the 1941–1942 construction programme. The ship's keel was laid down on 18 August 1941 by Port Arthur Shipbuilding Co at their yard in Port Arthur, Ontario. Named for a community in Ontario, Fort William was launched on 30 December 1941. The ship was commissioned on 25 August 1942 at Port Arthur.

The ship arrived at Halifax, Nova Scotia on 24 September 1942 and underwent further dockyard work after a number of defects were found in Fort William's construction. The repairs took until October to complete, when the minesweeper began her work ups. In November, Fort William was assigned to Halifax Force as a local convoy escort and patrol vessel. On 11 January 1943 the minesweeper collided with Lisgar in Halifax Harbour, suffering significant damage. Fort William underwent repairs at Halifax that took a month to complete.

In June 1943, the minesweeper transferred to Newfoundland Force, the local escort and patrol unit based at St. John's, Newfoundland. Fort William remained with that group until February 1944, when the minesweeper returned to Halifax to undergo a refit. Following the completion of the refit, the ship then sailed to Europe as part of Canada's contribution to the invasion of Normandy.

Upon arrival in March, Fort William was assigned to the 31st Minesweeping Flotilla. During the invasion, Fort William and her fellow minesweepers swept and marked channels through the German minefields leading into the invasion beaches in the American sector. The 31st Minesweeping Flotilla swept channel 3 on 6 June. While operating off Port-en-Bessin, Fort William and sister ship Caraquet fouled their sweeps on a wreck. While recovering their sweeps they came under fire from a shore battery near Saint-Laurent. The shore battery was silenced by naval gunfire from the battleship USS Arkansas. The Canadian Bangors spent most of June sweeping Channel 14, the widened area that combined assault channels 1 to 4.

The minesweepers spent the following months clearing the shipping lanes between the United Kingdom and mainland Europe. Towards the end of 1944, the minesweepers were also being used as a cross channel convoy escorts. In March 1945, Fort William returned to Canada to undergo another refit. The vessel rejoined the 31st Minesweeping Flotilla and remained in European waters until 21 September 1945.

After returning to Canada, the minesweeper was paid off at Sydney, Nova Scotia on 23 October 1945. Fort William was placed in strategic reserve at Sorel, Quebec in 1946. In June 1951 the minesweeper was reacquired by the Royal Canadian Navy during the Korean War and modernized. The vessel was taken to Sydney, Nova Scotia and given the new hull number FSE 195 and re-designated a coastal escort. However, the ship never recommissioned and remained in reserve at Sydney until 29 November 1957 when Fort William was formally transferred to the Turkish Navy. Renamed Bodrum by the Turkish Navy, the vessel remained in service until 1971 when it was discarded. The vessel was broken up in Turkey in 1971.
