= HMCS Westmount =

WWII Canadian minesweeper

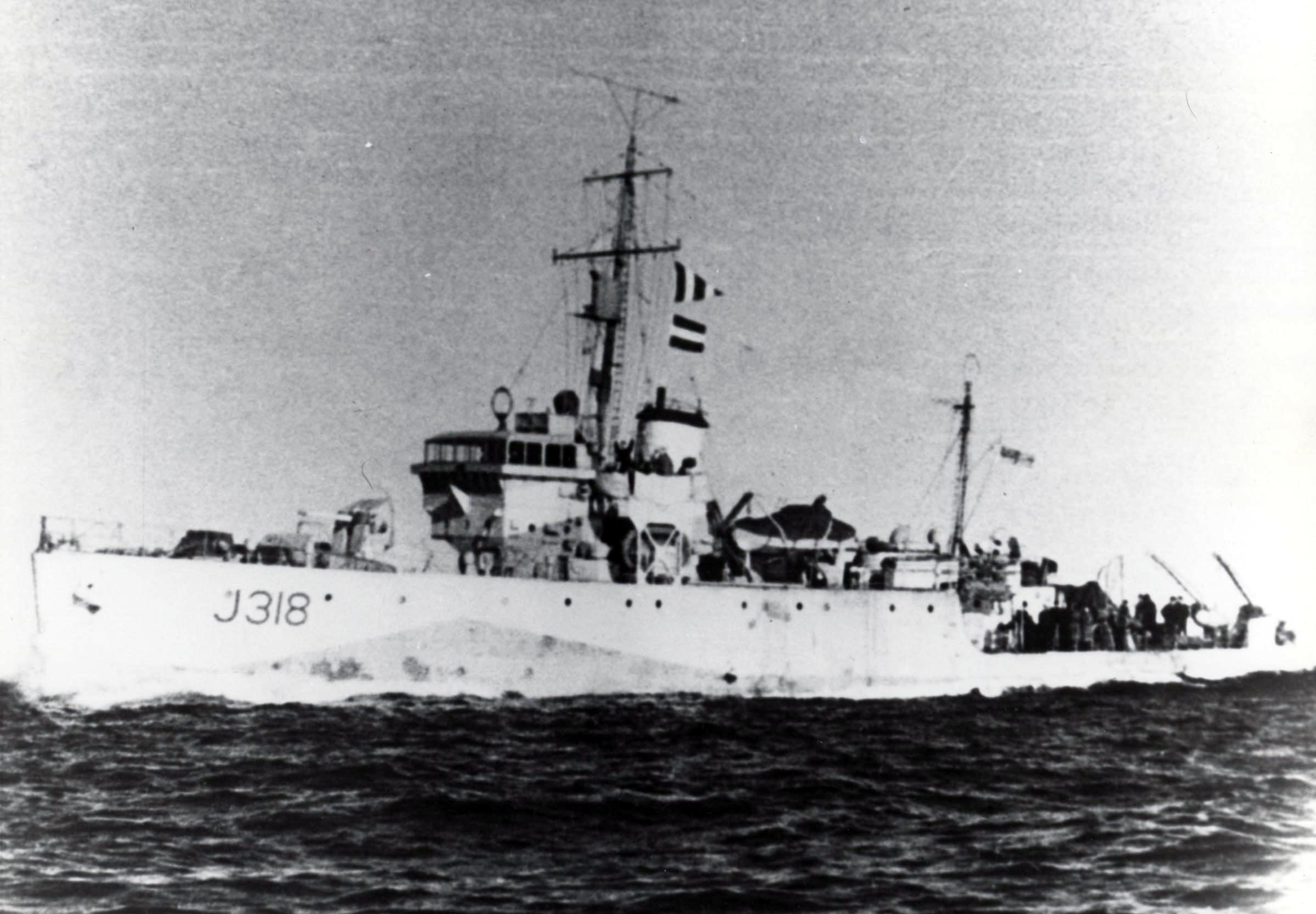

History

Canada
- Name: Westmount
- Namesake: Westmount, Quebec
- Builder: Davie Shipbuilding, Lauzon
- Laid down: 28 October 1941
- Launched: 14 March 1942
- Commissioned: 15 September 1942
- Decommissioned: 13 October 1945
- Identification: Pennant number: J318
- Honours and awards: Atlantic 1944, Gulf of St. Lawrence, 1944
- Fate: Transferred to Turkish Navy 1958

Turkey
- Name: Bornova
- Acquired: 29 March 1958
- Fate: Discarded 1972

General characteristics
- Class & type: Bangor-class minesweeper
- Displacement: 672 long tons (683 t)
- Length: 180 ft (54.9 m) oa
- Beam: 28 ft 6 in (8.7 m)
- Draught: 9 ft 9 in (3.0 m)
- Propulsion: 2 Admiralty 3-drum water tube boilers, 2 shafts, vertical triple-expansion reciprocating engines, 2,400 ihp (1,790 kW)
- Speed: 16.5 knots (31 km/h)
- Complement: 83
- Armament: 1 × 12-pounder (3 in (76 mm)) 12 cwt HA gun; 1 x QF 2 pdr Mark VIII; 2 × QF 20 mm Oerlikon guns; 40 depth charges as escort

HMCS Westmount (pennant J318) was a Bangor-class minesweeper that served with the Royal Canadian Navy during the Second World War. Entering service in 1942, the minesweeper spent the entire war on the Atlantic Canada coast. Following the war, the ship was laid up in reserve until reacquired in 1952 during the Korean War. Never re-entering service with the Royal Canadian Navy, the vessel was sold to the Turkish Navy in 1958. Renamed Bornova (also spelled Bor Nova), the minesweeper was discarded in 1972.

== Design and description ==
A British design, the Bangor-class minesweepers were smaller than the preceding Halcyon-class minesweepers in British service, but larger than the Fundy class in Canadian service. They came in two versions powered by different engines; those with a diesel engines and those with vertical triple-expansion steam engines. Westmount was of the latter design and was larger than her diesel-engined cousins. The minesweeper was 180 feet (54.9 m) long overall, had a beam of 28 feet 6 inches (8.7 m) and a draught of 9 feet 9 inches (3.0 m). Westmount had a displacement of 672 long tons (683 t). She had a complement of 6 officers and 77 enlisted.

Westmount had two vertical triple-expansion steam engines, each driving one shaft, using steam provided by two Admiralty three-drum boilers. The engines produced a total of 2,400 indicated horsepower (1,800 kW) and gave a maximum speed of 16.5 knots (30.6 km/h; 19.0 mph). The minesweeper could carry a maximum of 150 long tons (152 t) of fuel oil.

Westmount was armed with a single quick-firing (QF) 12-pounder (3 in (76 mm)) 12 cwt HA gun mounted forward. (Note: "Cwt" is the abbreviation for hundredweight, 20 cwt referring to the weight of the gun.) The ship was also fitted with a QF 2-pounder Mark VIII aft and were eventually fitted with single-mounted QF 20 mm Oerlikon guns on the bridge wings. Those ships assigned to convoy duty had two depth charge launchers and four chutes to deploy the 40 depth charges they carried. Westmount was equipped with LL and SA minesweeping gear to clear both magnetic and acoustic naval mines.

== Operational history ==
The minesweeper was ordered as part of the 1941–1942 construction programme. The ship's keel was laid down on 28 October 1941 by Davie Shipbuilding at their yard in Lauzon, Quebec. Named for a community in Quebec, Westmount was launched on 14 March 1942. The ship was commissioned on 15 September 1942 at Toronto.

While working up off Pictou, Nova Scotia, the ship developed engine issues that kept her at Halifax, Nova Scotia from 20 November 1942 to 2 February 1943. Following the minesweeper's return to service, Westmount was assigned to Halifax Local Defence Force and then Halifax Force, the escort and patrol force based at Halifax. In May 1943, the ship transferred to Sydney Force, the escort and patrol group based at Sydney, Nova Scotia and remained with the unit until January 1944. That month, the minesweeper rejoined Halifax Force. Other than a refit at Lunenburg, Nova Scotia that took from February to April 1945, Westmount remained on the Atlantic Canada coast for the remainder of the war.

The minesweeper was paid off at Sydney on 23 October 1945 and laid up at Shelburne, Nova Scotia. Westmount was taken to Sorel, Quebec in 1946 and placed in strategic reserve. In 1951 the minesweeper was reacquired by the Royal Canadian Navy during the Korean War. The vessel was given the new hull number FSE 187 and re-designated a coastal escort. However, the ship never recommissioned and remained in reserve until 29 March 1958 when Westmount was formally transferred to the Turkish Navy. Renamed Bornova (also spelled Bor Nova) by the Turkish Navy, the vessel remained in service until 1972 when it was discarded. The vessel was broken up in Turkey in 1972.
