= TCG Demirhisar (H80) =

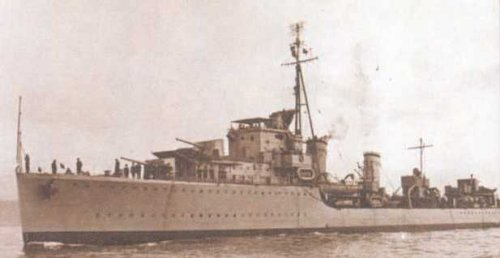
- Sister ship TCG Sultanhisar

History

Turkey
- Name: TCG Demirhisar
- Builder: William Denny and Brothers, Dumbarton
- Laid down: 1939
- Launched: 28 January 1941
- Completed: 1942
- Acquired: 1942
- Decommissioned: 1960
- Stricken: 1960
- Fate: Decommissioned 1960

General characteristics
- Class & type: Demirhisar-class destroyer
- Displacement: 1,360 long tons (1,380 t) (standard); 1,910 long tons (1,940 t) (deep load)
- Length: 323 ft (98.5 m)
- Beam: 33 ft (10.1 m)
- Draught: 8 ft 6 in (2.6 m)
- Installed power: 34,000 shp (25,000 kW); 3 Admiralty 3-drum boilers
- Propulsion: 2 shafts; 2 geared steam turbines
- Speed: 35.5 knots (65.7 km/h; 40.9 mph)
- Complement: 145
- Sensors & processing systems: ASDIC
- Armament: 4 × single QF 4.7-inch (120 mm) Mk IX guns; 4 × single Oerlikon 20 mm cannon; 2 × quadruple 21-inch (533 mm) torpedo tubes

TCG Demirhisar was the name ship of the four her class of destroyers built for the Turkish Navy during the Second World War. The design of her class was based on the British I class.

== Description ==
Demirhisar displaced 1,360 long tons (1,380 t) at standard load and 1,910 long tons (1,940 t) at deep load. The ship had an overall length of 323 feet (98.5 m), a beam of 33 feet (10.1 m) and a draught of 8 feet 6 inches (2.6 m). She was powered by Parsons geared steam turbines, driving two shafts, which developed a total of 34,000 shaft horsepower (25,000 kW) and gave a maximum speed of 35.5 knots (65.7 km/h; 40.9 mph). Steam for the turbines was provided by three Admiralty three-drum boilers. Demirhisar carried a maximum of 455 long tons (462 t) of fuel oil. The ship's complement was 145 officers and ratings.

The ship mounted four 45-calibre 4.7-inch (120 mm) Mark IX guns in single mounts. For anti-aircraft (AA) defence, Demirhisar had four single mounts for Oerlikon 20 mm cannon. She was fitted with two above-water quadruple mounts for 21-inch (533 mm) torpedoes.

== Construction and career ==
Demirhisar was one of four I-class destroyers ordered by Turkey in 1939, two of which were purchased by the Royal Navy while construction of the other two proceeded slowly. The ship was laid down at William Denny and Brothers in Dumbarton, Scotland in 1939. She was launched two years later and completed in 1942. The destroyer was transferred to Turkey in later that year, where she served until her decommissioning in 1960.
