= HMCS Nipigon (J154) =

1940 Royal Canadian Navy minesweeper

History

Canada
- Name: Nipigon
- Namesake: Township of Nipigon
- Builder: Dufferin Shipbuilding Co., Toronto
- Laid down: 4 July 1940
- Launched: 1 October 1940
- Commissioned: 8 November 1941
- Decommissioned: 13 October 1945
- Identification: Pennant number: J154; 188 (1952)
- Honours and awards: Atlantic 1941–45, Gulf of St. Lawrence 1942, 1944
- Fate: Sold to Turkey, 1957

Turkey
- Name: Bafra
- Acquired: 29 November 1957
- Commissioned: 13 January 1958
- Out of service: 1972
- Identification: P-121
- Fate: Registry deleted 1972

General characteristics
- Class & type: Bangor-class minesweeper
- Displacement: 672 long tons (683 t)
- Length: 180 ft (54.9 m) oa
- Beam: 28 ft 6 in (8.7 m)
- Draught: 9 ft 9 in (3.0 m)
- Propulsion: 2 Admiralty 3-drum water tube boilers, 2 shafts, vertical triple-expansion reciprocating engines, 2,400 ihp (1,790 kW)
- Speed: 16.5 knots (31 km/h)
- Complement: 83
- Armament: 1 × QF 4 in (102 mm)/40 cal Mk IV gun; 1 × QF 2-pounder Mark VIII; 2 × QF 20 mm Oerlikon guns; 40 depth charges as escort

HMCS Nipigon was a Bangor-class minesweeper that served in the Royal Canadian Navy during the Second World War. She saw action in the Battle of the Atlantic and the Battle of the St. Lawrence. She was named for Nipigon, Ontario. After the war she was sold to Turkey and renamed Bafra. She served as such from 1957 until 1972.

== Design and description ==
A British design, the Bangor-class minesweepers were smaller than the preceding Halcyon-class minesweepers in British service, but larger than the Fundy class in Canadian service. They came in two versions powered by different engines; those with a diesel engines and those with vertical triple-expansion steam engines. Nipigon was of the latter design and was larger than her diesel-engined cousins. Nipigon was 180 feet (54.9 m) long overall, had a beam of 28 feet 6 inches (8.7 m) and a draught of 9 feet 9 inches (3.0 m). The minesweeper had a displacement of 672 long tons (683 t). She had a complement of 6 officers and 77 enlisted.

Nipigon had two vertical triple-expansion steam engines, each driving one shaft, using steam provided by two Admiralty three-drum boilers. The engines produced a total of 2,400 indicated horsepower (1,800 kW) and gave a maximum speed of 16.5 knots (30.6 km/h; 19.0 mph). The minesweeper could carry a maximum of 150 long tons (152 t) of fuel oil.

Nipigon was armed with a single quick-firing (QF) 4-inch (102 mm)/40 caliber Mk IV gun mounted forward. (Note: The 40 caliber denotes the length of the gun. This means that the length of the gun barrel is 40 times the bore diameter.) For anti-aircraft purposes, the minesweeper was equipped with one QF 2-pounder Mark VIII and two single-mounted QF 20 mm Oerlikon guns. As a convoy escort, Chedabucto was deployed with 40 depth charges.

== Service history ==
Nipigon was ordered as part of the 1939–1940 building programme. The minesweeper's keel was laid down on 4 July 1940 by Dufferin Shipbuilding Co. at Toronto and the ship was launched on 1 October later that year. She was commissioned into the Royal Canadian Navy on 11 August 1941 at Toronto with the pennant number J154.

After commissioning, Nipigon was assigned to Sydney Force beginning in October 1941. She remained with this unit until 17 January 1942. She then spent periods of service with the Western Local Escort Force (WLEF), Halifax Force and Newfoundland Force. In June 1943, when WLEF divided its escorts into groups, the ship was assigned to EG W-1 as a convoy escort.

In early 1944, Nipigon underwent a refit, beginning at Lunenburg and completed at Liverpool. After completing workups, she was assigned to Halifax Force again until it was disbanded in 1945. She then performed various duties along the Atlantic coast until paid off at Sydney on 13 October 1945. She was laid up at Shelburne, Nova Scotia.

Following the war, Nipigon was placed in strategic reserve at Sorel, Quebec in 1946. She was reacquired by the Royal Canadian Navy in 1952 and refitted in preparation for active duty. The minesweeper was given the new pennant number 188, however she was never recommissioned. In 1953, Nipigon was re-rated as a coastal escort. She was sold to the Turkish Naval Forces on 29 November 1957 and renamed Bafra. The vessel sailed to Turkey on 19 May 1958. She served until 1972 when her registry was deleted. The ship was broken up in Turkey in 1972.

== See also ==
- List of ships of the Canadian Navy
