= HMCS Mahone =

History

Canada
- Name: Mahone
- Namesake: Mahone Bay
- Builder: North Van Ship Repair, North Vancouver
- Laid down: 13 August 1940
- Launched: 14 November 1940
- Commissioned: 29 September 1941
- Decommissioned: 6 November 1945
- Identification: Pennant number: J159
- Honours and awards: Atlantic 1942, 1944-45
- Fate: Transferred to Turkey 1958

Turkey
- Name: Beylerbeyi
- Acquired: 29 March 1958
- Fate: Discarded 1972

General characteristics
- Class & type: Bangor-class minesweeper
- Displacement: 672 long tons (683 t)
- Length: 180 ft (54.9 m) oa
- Beam: 28 ft 6 in (8.7 m)
- Draught: 9 ft 9 in (3.0 m)
- Propulsion: 2 Admiralty 3-drum water tube boilers, 2 shafts, vertical triple-expansion reciprocating engines, 2,400 ihp (1,790 kW)
- Speed: 16.5 knots (31 km/h)
- Complement: 83
- Armament: 1 × QF 4 in (102 mm)/40 cal Mk IV gun; 1 × QF 2-pounder Mark VIII; 2 × QF 20 mm Oerlikon guns; 40 depth charges as escort

HMCS Mahone (pennant J159) was a Bangor-class minesweeper constructed for the Royal Canadian Navy during the Second World War. Entering service in 1941, the ship took part in the Battle of the Atlantic and the Battle of the Saint Lawrence as a convoy escort. Following the war, the minesweeper was decommissioned and placed in reserve. Reacquired during the Korean War, Mahone was never recommissioned into the Royal Canadian Navy and was instead sold to the Turkish Navy in 1958. Renamed Beylerbeyi, the minesweeper remained in service until 1972 when she was discarded.

== Design and description ==
A British design, the Bangor-class minesweepers were smaller than the preceding Halcyon-class minesweepers in British service, but larger than the Fundy class in Canadian service. They came in two versions powered by different engines; those with a diesel engines and those with vertical triple-expansion steam engines. Mahone was of the latter design and was larger than her diesel-engined cousins. Mahone was 180 feet (54.9 m) long overall, had a beam of 28 feet 6 inches (8.7 m) and a draught of 9 feet 9 inches (3.0 m). The minesweeper had a displacement of 672 long tons (683 t). She had a complement of 6 officers and 77 enlisted.

Mahone had two vertical triple-expansion steam engines, each driving one shaft, using steam provided by two Admiralty three-drum boilers. The engines produced a total of 2,400 indicated horsepower (1,800 kW) and gave a maximum speed of 16.5 knots (30.6 km/h; 19.0 mph). The minesweeper could carry a maximum of 150 long tons (152 t) of fuel oil.

Mahone was armed with a single quick-firing (QF) 4-inch (102 mm)/40 caliber Mk IV gun mounted forward. (Note: The 40 caliber denotes the length of the gun. This means that the length of the gun barrel is 40 times the bore diameter.) For anti-aircraft purposes, the minesweeper was equipped with one QF 2-pounder Mark VIII and two single-mounted QF 20 mm Oerlikon guns. As a convoy escort, Mahone was deployed with deployed with 40 depth charges launched from two depth charge throwers and four chutes.

== Operational history ==
=== War service ===
The minesweeper was ordered as part of the 1939–40 construction programme. The ship's keel was laid down on 13 August 1940 by North Vancouver Ship Repairs Ltd. at their yard in North Vancouver, British Columbia. Mahone was launched on 14 November 1940 and commissioned into the Royal Canadian Navy at Vancouver on 29 September 1941.

The minesweeper left Esquimalt, British Columbia on 11 November for the East Coast of Canada. Mahone arrived in Halifax, Nova Scotia on 11 December and was assigned to the Western Local Escort Force (WLEF) as a convoy escort. In May 1942, the vessel transferred to Halifax Force, the local escort force operating out of Halifax. The ship remained with the unit until January 1943 when Mahone began a refit on 19 January at Liverpool, Nova Scotia.

The refit was completed on 3 April 1943 and Mahone was assigned to Gaspé Force, the patrol and convoy escort group assigned to protect convoys in the Gulf of St. Lawrence and the Saint Lawrence River. This transfer was due to increased activity by German U-boats in those bodies of water. In September 1943, Mahone was among the warships deployed as part of the Canadian force to break up Operation Kiebitz, the German plan to breakout prisoner of war U-boat captains from a camp in Canada. Mahone was among those sent to intercept the U-boat U-536 as it entered Chaleur Bay to rescue the prisoners. The submarine sighted the warships before entering the harbour and broke off the attempt before it could be intercepted.

In November 1943 Mahone was reassigned to Halifax Force and then transferred to Sydney Force, the local patrol and escort force operating from Sydney, Nova Scotia. On 29 January 1944, the minesweeper was rammed by the merchant vessel SS Fort Townshend off Louisburg, Nova Scotia. Repairs done at Halifax took four months to complete. After working up in Bermuda, the vessel returned to Halifax in July 1945 and remained in service there until being paid off on 6 November 1945. The vessel was taken to Shelburne, Nova Scotia and laid up there.

=== Postwar service ===
In 1946, Mahone was placed in strategic reserve and taken to Sorel, Quebec. During the Korean War, the vessel was reacquired by the Royal Canadian Navy and given the new hull number FSE 192 and re-designated a coastal escort. However, the ship never recommissioned and remained in reserve at Sydney until 29 March 1958 when Mahone was formally transferred to the Turkish Navy.

The minesweeper was renamed Beylerbeyi and remained in service with the Turkish Navy until being discarded in 1972. The vessel was broken up in Turkey in 1972. The ship's registry was not closed until 1979.

== See also ==
- List of ships of the Canadian Navy
