= USS PC-1639 =

Patrol boat of the US Navy

History

United States
- Name: PC-1639
- Builder: Gunderson Brothers Engineering Corp., Portland
- Laid down: 1963
- Launched: 1964
- Fate: Transferred to Turkish Navy

Turkey
- Name: Demirhisar
- Identification: Callsign: TBLN; Pennant number: P 112
- Status: Unknown

General characteristics
- Class & type: PC-1638-class submarine chaser; Hisar-class patrol boat
- Displacement: 295 tons (full load)
- Length: 175 ft (53 m)
- Beam: 23 ft (7.0 m)
- Draft: 10 ft 10 in (3.30 m)
- Propulsion: 2 x 2,400hp ALCO 169X 10AT diesel engines; 2 shafts
- Speed: 20 knots (37 km/h)
- Complement: 59
- Armament: 1 x Mk 15 ASW Hedgehog mortar; 1 × 40 mm gun; 3 × 20 mm cannons; 2 rocket launchers; 4 depth charge projectiles; 2 depth charge tracks

USS PC-1639 was an PC-1638-class submarine chaser in the United States Navy during the Cold War. She was transferred to the Turkish Navy as TCG Demirhisar (P 112) of the Hisar-class patrol boat.

== Construction and commissioning ==
PC-1639 was laid down in 1963 at Gunderson Brothers Engineering Corps., Portland, Oregon and launched in 1964.

She was transferred to the Turkish Navy in San Diego and renamed TCG Demirhisar (P 112).
