= I-class destroyer =

1937 class of British destroyers

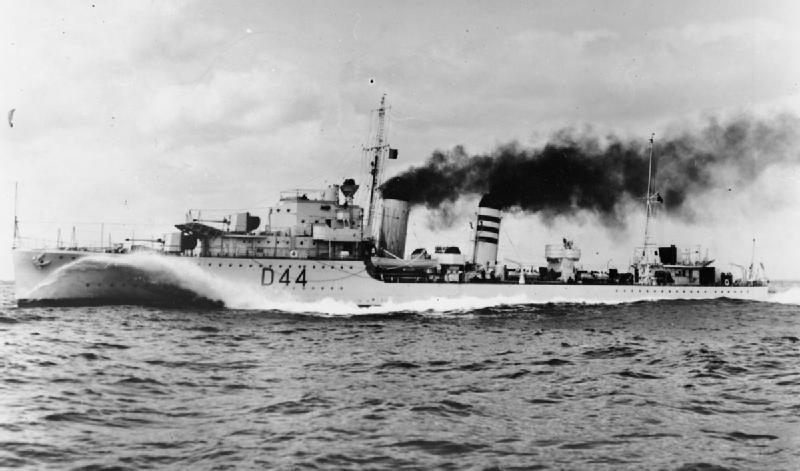
- HMS Imogen

Class overview
- Name: I class
- Operators: Royal Navy; Turkish Navy
- Preceded by: G and H class
- Succeeded by: Tribal class
- In commission: 1937–1960
- Completed: 13
- Lost: 6
- Scrapped: 7

General characteristics (as built)
- Type: Destroyer
- Displacement: 1,370 long tons (1,390 t) (standard); 1,888 long tons (1,918 t) (deep load)
- Length: 323 ft (98.5 m)
- Beam: 33 ft (10.1 m)
- Draught: 12 ft 5 in (3.8 m)
- Installed power: 34,000 shp (25,000 kW); 3 Admiralty 3-drum boilers
- Propulsion: 2 shafts; 2 geared steam turbines
- Speed: 36 knots (67 km/h; 41 mph)
- Range: 5,530 nmi (10,240 km; 6,360 mi) at 15 knots (28 km/h; 17 mph)
- Complement: 137 (peacetime), 145 (wartime)
- Sensors & processing systems: ASDIC
- Armament: 4 × 1 - QF 4.7-inch (120 mm) Mk IX guns; 2 × 4 - 0.5-inch (12.7 mm) machine guns; 2 × 5 - 21-inch (533 mm) torpedo tubes; 20 × Depth charges, 1 rack and 2 throwers; 60 mines (minelayers only)

The I-class destroyers were a group of nine destroyers, including a flotilla leader, built for the Royal Navy during the 1930s. Four similar ships were ordered by the Turkish Navy, of which two were purchased for the Royal Navy, bringing the number of these ships in British service to 11—although three of the original ships had been lost by the time Inconstant and Ithuriel were commissioned. The I-class served in World War II and six were lost, with a seventh ship being written off.

== Design ==
The I-class was a repeat of the preceding H class, except that they had ten torpedo tubes (two banks of five) instead of eight. They incorporated the new bridge and wheelhouse layout as tested in Hero and Hereward (except the flotilla leader Inglefield). Inglefield also had a larger tripod foremast, her sisters having pole masts. The extra weight of the torpedo tubes and the fitting of minesweeps and depth charge gear (previous vessels carried one or the other) on the same hull as the H class, caused a loss of stability, needing ballast when bunker levels were low.

All ships were fitted for minesweeping and with depth charges and Asdic for anti-submarine (A/S) work and were capable of conversion to minelayers. For this, they landed 'A' and 'Y' 4.7 inch guns, the torpedo tubes and their minesweeps, allowing carriage of up to 60 mines but only four ships were used like this (see below).

=== Ships built for Turkey ===
The Turkish I-class ships were of a similar design to their British counterparts but shipped only eight torpedoes (two banks of four) like the British H class.

=== Wartime modifications ===
Early war modifications involved replacing the after bank of torpedoes with a QF 12-pounder (3 inch/76 mm) anti-aircraft (AA) gun, cutting down the after funnel and mainmast to improve its field of fire and adding a pair of QF 20 mm Oerlikon guns in the bridge wings. Radar Type 286, a metric wavelength surface-warning set, was added as it became available and the ineffective multiple 0.5 in (13 mm) Vickers machine guns were replaced with Oerlikons; the central tube was deleted from the torpedo launchers to lessen topweight. Icarus lost 'Y' gun to stow extra depth charges (for a total load of 110) and their mortars. Surviving ships received a third pair of Oerlikons, added abreast the searchlight position and the 12-pounder was deleted to increase depth charge stowage. In some ships, 'A' gun was replaced with a Hedgehog forward-throwing A/S weapon but this alteration seems to have been reversed at a later stage. Ilex, Intrepid, Impulsive and Isis had 'B' gun removed and two QF 6-pounder 10 cwt (2.25 inch/57 mm L/47) guns were added on the twin mounting Mark I* along with a Hedgehog, the former for anti-E boat work.

Inglefield later had the second bank of torpedo tubes re-instated but like her sisters, the central tube was removed. A 4 in (100 mm) AA gun was added instead of 'X' gun and she had six Oerlikons. Type 291 radar was later added at the foremast head as well as Huff-Duff in some ships.

The ex-Turkish ships were modified along similar lines to their I-class sisters. Inconstant later received Type 270 radar, a centimetric wavelength target-indication set, in place of the director and rangefinder on the bridge. Again, eventually, six Oerlikons were carried.

== Ships ==
Construction data
Ship	Builder	Laid down	Launched	Commissioned	Fate
Icarus (Note: Fitted as minelayer)	John Brown & Company, Clydebank	9 March 1936	26 November 1936	3 May 1937	Sold for scrap, 29 October 1946
Ilex	John Brown & Company, Clydebank	9 March 1936	28 January 1937	7 July 1937	Sold for scrap, 1947
Imogen	Hawthorn Leslie & Company, Hebburn	18 January 1936	30 October 1936	2 June 1937	Sank after a collision with the cruiser Glasgow, 16 July 1940
Imperial	Hawthorn Leslie & Company, Hebburn	29 January 1936	11 December 1936	30 June 1937	Severely damaged by air attack, 29 May 1941, sunk by torpedoes from Hotspur
Impulsive	J. Samuel White, Cowes	9 March 1936	1 March 1937	29 January 1938	Sold for scrap, 22 January 1946
Inglefield	Cammell Laird & Company, Birkenhead	29 April 1936	15 October 1936	25 June 1937	Sunk by German radio-controlled glide bomb, 25 February 1944
Intrepid	J. Samuel White, Cowes	6 January 1936	17 December 1936	29 July 1937	Sunk by German bombers, 26 September 1943
Isis	Yarrow & Company, Scotstoun	5 February 1936	12 December 1936	2 June 1937	Mined and sunk off Normandy beaches, 20 July 1944
Ivanhoe	Yarrow & Company, Scotstoun	12 February 1936	11 February 1937	24 August 1937	Mined and sunk off Texel, 1 September 1940

=== Turkish ships ===
Four ships were ordered for the Turkish Navy in 1938. Upon the outbreak of war, two were purchased by the British but two were delivered to Turkey in 1942 as the Sultanhisar and the Demirhisar.

Construction data
Ship	Builder	Laid down	Launched	Completed	Fate
Inconstant (ex-Muavenet)	Vickers, Barrow	24 May 1939	24 February 1941	24 January 1942	Acquired 14 November 1941, returned to Turkey 9 March 1946, sold for scrap, 1960
Ithuriel (ex-Gayret)	Vickers, Barrow	24 May 1939	15 December 1940	3 March 1942	Bombed at Bône 28 November 1942 and beached; sold for scrap, 25 August 1945
Sultanhisar	William Denny, Dumbarton	21 March 1939	17 December 1940	28 June 1941	Delivered to Turkey in 1942, decommissioned 1960
Demirhisar	William Denny, Dumbarton	1939	28 January 1941	1942	Delivered to Turkey in 1942, decommissioned 1960

== Bibliography ==
- Colledge, J. J.; Warlow, Ben (2006) [1969]. Ships of the Royal Navy: The Complete Record of All Fighting Ships of the Royal Navy from the 15th Century to the Present (3rd Rev ed.). London: Chatham Publishing. ISBN 978-1-86176-281-8. OCLC 67375475.
- English, John (1993). Amazon to Ivanhoe: British Standard Destroyers of the 1930s. Kendal: World Ship Society. ISBN 0-905617-64-9.
- Friedman, Norman (2006). British Destroyers & Frigates: The Second World War and After. Annapolis, Maryland: Naval Institute Press. ISBN 1-86176-137-6.
- Hodges, Peter & Friedman, Norman (1979). Destroyer Weapons of World War 2. Greenwich: Conway Maritime Press. ISBN 978-0-85177-137-3.
- Lenton, H. T. (1998). British & Empire Warships of the Second World War. Annapolis, Maryland: Naval Institute Press. ISBN 1-55750-048-7.
- Lyon, Hugh & Chumbley, Stephen (1995). "Turkey". In Chumbley, Stephen (ed.). Conway's All the World's Fighting Ships 1947-1995. Annapolis, Maryland: Naval Institute Press. ISBN 1-55750-132-7.
- March, Edgar J. (1966). British Destroyers: A History of Development, 1892-1953; Drawn by Admiralty Permission From Official Records & Returns, Ships' Covers & Building Plans. London: Seeley Service. OCLC 164893555.
- Rohwer, Jürgen (2005). Chronology of the War at Sea 1939–1945: The Naval History of World War Two (Third Revised ed.). Annapolis, Maryland: Naval Institute Press. ISBN 1-59114-119-2.
- Smith, Peter C. (2005). Into the Minefields: British Destroyer Minelaying 1918–1980. Barnsley, UK: Pen & Sword Books. ISBN 1-84415-271-5.
- Whitley, M. J. (1988). Destroyers of World War Two: An International Encyclopedia. Annapolis, Maryland: Naval Institute Press. ISBN 0-87021-326-1.
