= HMCS Medicine Hat =

History

Canada
- Name: Medicine Hat
- Namesake: Medicine Hat, Alberta
- Builder: Canadian Vickers Ltd., Montreal
- Laid down: 10 January 1941
- Launched: 25 June 1941
- Commissioned: 4 December 1941
- Decommissioned: 6 November 1945
- Identification: Pennant number: J256
- Honours and awards: Atlantic 1943, Gulf of St. Lawrence 1942
- Fate: Transferred to Turkish Navy 1957

Turkey
- Name: Biga
- Acquired: 29 November 1957
- Fate: Discarded 1963

General characteristics
- Class & type: Bangor-class minesweeper
- Displacement: 672 long tons (683 t)
- Length: 180 ft (54.9 m) oa
- Beam: 28 ft 6 in (8.7 m)
- Draught: 9 ft 9 in (3.0 m)
- Propulsion: 2 Admiralty 3-drum water tube boilers, 2 shafts, vertical triple-expansion reciprocating engines, 2,400 ihp (1,790 kW)
- Speed: 16.5 knots (31 km/h)
- Complement: 83
- Armament: 1 × QF 3-inch (76 mm) 20 cwt gun; 1 x QF 2 pdr Mark VIII; 2 × QF 20 mm Oerlikon guns; 40 depth charges as escort

HMCS Medicine Hat (pennant J256) was a Bangor-class minesweeper that served with the Royal Canadian Navy during the Second World War. Entering service in 1941, the minesweeper was primarily used as a convoy escort in the Battle of the Atlantic and the Battle of the St. Lawrence. Following the war the vessel was laid up until reacquired during the Korean War. Never re-entering service with the Royal Canadian Navy, Medicine Hat was sold to the Turkish Navy in 1957. Renamed Biga, the minesweeper was discarded in 1963.

== Design and description ==
A British design, the Bangor-class minesweepers were smaller than the preceding Halcyon-class minesweepers in British service, but larger than the Fundy class in Canadian service. They came in two versions powered by different engines; those with a diesel engines and those with vertical triple-expansion steam engines. Medicine Hat was of the latter design and was larger than her diesel-engined cousins. The minesweeper was 180 feet (54.9 m) long overall, had a beam of 28 feet 6 inches (8.7 m) and a draught of 9 feet 9 inches (3.0 m). Medicine Hat had a displacement of 672 long tons (683 t). She had a complement of 6 officers and 77 enlisted.

Medicine Hat had two vertical triple-expansion steam engines, each driving one shaft, using steam provided by two Admiralty three-drum boilers. The engines produced a total of 2,400 indicated horsepower (1,800 kW) and gave a maximum speed of 16.5 knots (30.6 km/h; 19.0 mph). The minesweeper could carry a maximum of 150 long tons (152 t) of fuel oil.

The minesweeper was armed with a single quick-firing (QF) 3-inch (76 mm) 20 cwt gun mounted forward. (Note: "Cwt" is the abbreviation for hundredweight, 20 cwt referring to the weight of the gun.) The ship was also fitted with a QF 2-pounder Mark VIII aft and were eventually fitted with single-mounted QF 20 mm Oerlikon guns on the bridge wings. Those ships assigned to convoy duty were armed with two depth charge launchers and four chutes to deploy their 40 depth charges. Medicine Hat was equipped with SA and LL minesweeping gear for the detection of acoustic and magnetic naval mines.

== Operational history ==
The minesweeper was ordered as part of the 1940–1941 construction programme. The ship's keel was laid down on 10 January 1941 by Canadian Vickers Ltd at their yard in Montreal, Quebec. Named for a community in Alberta, Medicine Hat was launched on 25 June 1941. The ship was commissioned on 4 December 1941 at Montreal.

After arriving at Halifax, Nova Scotia on 13 December, the vessel was assigned to the Western Local Escort Force (WLEF) as a convoy escort in the Battle of the Atlantic. In June 1942, Medicine Hat transferred to Sydney Force, the patrol and escort force operating out of Sydney, Nova Scotia. During this period, Medicine Hat was one of the Bangor-class minesweepers assigned to take coastal convoys through the Gulf of St. Lawrence and the St. Lawrence River. The Battle of the St. Lawrence began in May 1942 and carried on through the summer. Medicine Hat escorted the first Quebec City-Sydney convoy, QS 1. In January 1943, the minesweeper rejoined WLEF for six months, transferring to Halifax Force for patrol and local escort duties out of Halifax in June.

Medicine Hat remained with Halifax Force until May 1944 with the exception of November–December 1943. During that period, the minesweeper joined Newfoundland Force, the escort and patrol unit based in St. John's, Newfoundland. In May 1944, Medicine Hat shifted back to Sydney Force and remained with that unit until January 1945. That month the warship joined Newfoundland Force until the end of the European war. Following the end of hostilities in Europe, Medicine Hat performed miscellaneous duties along the Atlantic coast until paid off at Halifax on 6 November 1945. The vessel was laid up in Shelburne, Nova Scotia until 1946, when the minesweeper was placed in strategic reserve at Sorel, Quebec.

Medicine Hat remained at Sorel until 1951, when the minesweeper was reacquired by the Royal Canadian Navy during the Korean War. The vessel was taken to Sydney, Nova Scotia and given the new hull number FSE 197 and re-designated a coastal escort. However, the ship never recommissioned and remained in reserve at Sydney until 29 November 1957 when Medicine Hat was formally transferred to the Turkish Navy. Renamed Biga by the Turkish Navy, the vessel remained in service until 1963, when it was discarded. The vessel was broken up in Turkey in 1963.
