= HMAS Broome (J191) =

1941 Bathurst-class corvette

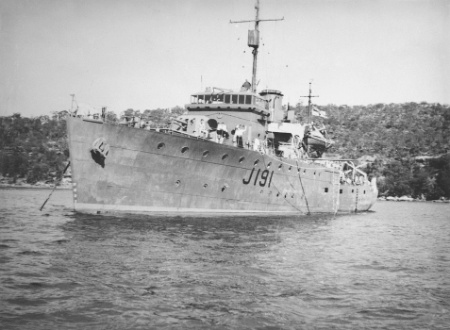
- HMAS Broome

History

Australia
- Namesake: Town of Broome, Western Australia
- Builder: Evans Deakin and Company
- Laid down: 3 May 1941
- Launched: 6 October 1941
- Commissioned: 29 July 1942
- Decommissioned: 24 August 1946
- Honours and awards: Battle honours: Pacific 1942-45; New Guinea 1942-44
- Fate: Sold to the Turkish Navy
- Badge

History

Turkey
- Name: Alanya
- Commissioned: 1946
- Decommissioned: 1975

General characteristics
- Class & type: Bathurst-class corvette
- Displacement: 650 tons (standard), 1,025 tons (full war load)
- Length: 186 ft (57 m)
- Beam: 31 ft (9.4 m)
- Draught: 8.5 ft (2.6 m)
- Propulsion: triple expansion engine, 2 shafts
- Speed: 15 knots (28 km/h; 17 mph) at 1,750 hp
- Complement: 85
- Armament: 1 × 4 inch Mk XIX gun, 3 × Oerlikon 20 mm cannons, Machine guns, Depth charges chutes and throwers

HMAS Broome (J191), named for the town of Broome, Western Australia, was one of 60 Bathurst-class corvettes constructed during World War II and one of 20 built for the Admiralty but manned by personnel of and commissioned into the Royal Australian Navy (RAN).

== Design and construction ==
In 1938, the Australian Commonwealth Naval Board (ACNB) identified the need for a general purpose 'local defence vessel' capable of both anti-submarine and mine-warfare duties, while easy to construct and operate. The vessel was initially envisaged as having a displacement of approximately 500 tons, a speed of at least 10 knots (19 km/h; 12 mph), and a range of 2,000 nautical miles (3,700 km; 2,300 mi) The opportunity to build a prototype in the place of a cancelled Bar-class boom defence vessel saw the proposed design increased to a 680-ton vessel, with a 15.5 knots (28.7 km/h; 17.8 mph) top speed, and a range of 2,850 nautical miles (5,280 km; 3,280 mi), armed with a 4-inch gun, equipped with asdic, and able to fitted with either depth charges or minesweeping equipment depending on the planned operations: although closer in size to a sloop than a local defence vessel, the resulting increased capabilities were accepted due to advantages over British-designed mine warfare and anti-submarine vessels. Construction of the prototype HMAS Kangaroo did not go ahead, but the plans were retained. The need for locally built 'all-rounder' vessels at the start of World War II saw the "Australian Minesweepers" (designated as such to hide their anti-submarine capability, but popularly referred to as "corvettes") approved in September 1939, with 60 constructed during the course of the war: 36 ordered by the RAN, 20 (including Broome) ordered by the British Admiralty but manned and commissioned as RAN vessels, and 4 for the Royal Indian Navy.

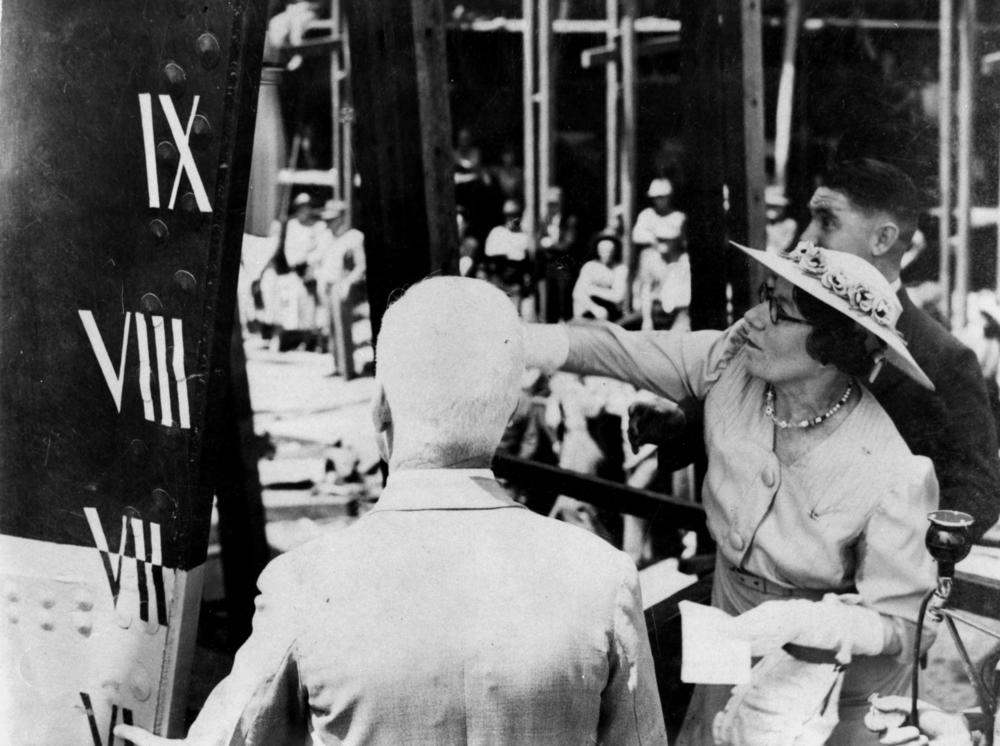
Mrs McKew launching Broome

Broome was laid down by Evans Deakin and Company at Brisbane on 3 May 1941, launched on 6 October 1941 by Mrs. M. J. McKew, wife of the shipyard's works manager, and commissioned on 29 July 1942.

== Operational history ==
The corvette operated during World War II, and was awarded the battle honours "Pacific 1942-45" and "New Guinea 1942-44" for her service.

HMAS Broome paid off on 24 August 1946, was sold to the Turkish Navy and renamed Alanya. The vessel left Turkish service in 1975. The ship's bell was recovered before the sale, and returned to Broome. It was presented to the Broome Road Board in June 1952, who then passed the bell on to Broome State School in November. The bell later ended up at the town's Returned and Services League club.
