= TCG Sultanhisar (P-111) =

Turkish warship

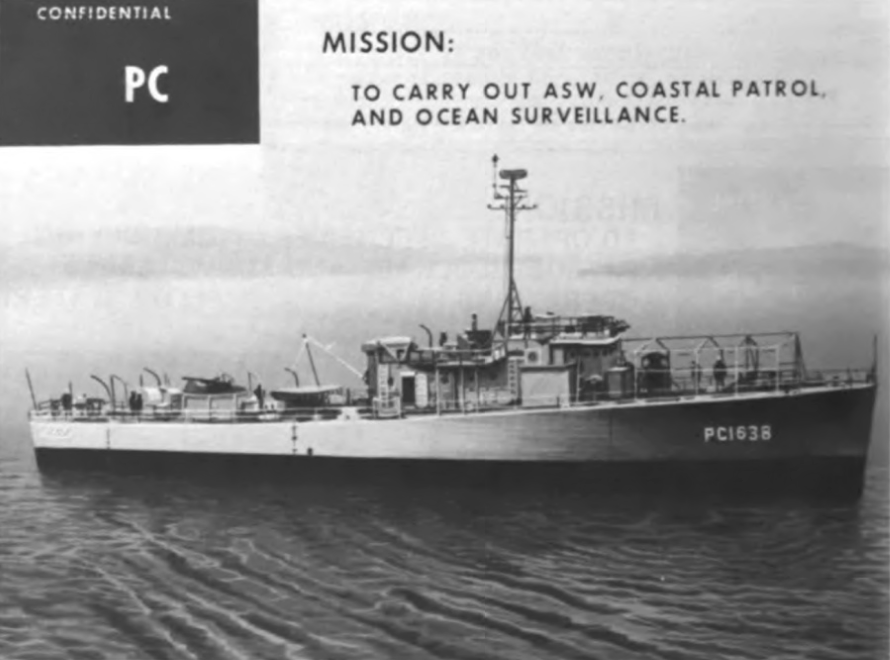
- USS PC-1638

History

United States
- Name: PC-1638
- Builder: Gunderson Brothers Engineering Corp., Portland
- Laid down: 1963
- Launched: 1963
- Commissioned: 1964
- Decommissioned: 9 May 1964
- Fate: Transferred to Turkish Navy, 9 May 1964

Turkey
- Name: Sultanhisar
- Namesake: Sultanhisar
- Acquired: 9 May 1964
- Commissioned: 25 January 1965
- Decommissioned: 3 June 2002
- Identification: Callsign: TBLM; Pennant number: P 111
- Status: Decommissioned

General characteristics
- Class & type: PC-1638-class submarine chaser; Hisar-class patrol boat
- Displacement: 295 tons (full load)
- Length: 175 ft (53 m)
- Beam: 23 ft (7.0 m)
- Draft: 10 ft 10 in (3.30 m)
- Propulsion: 2 x 2,400hp ALCO 169X 10AT diesel engines; 2 shafts
- Speed: 20 knots (37 km/h)
- Complement: 59
- Armament: 1 x Mk 15 ASW Hedgehog mortar; 1 × 40 mm gun; 3 × 20 mm cannons; 2 rocket launchers; 4 depth charge projectiles; 2 depth charge tracks

TCG Sultanhisar (P-111), ex-USS PC-1638, was a Hisar-class patrol boat of the Turkish Navy. She was built in 1963 by Gunderson Brothers Engineering Corp. in Portland, Oregon as a submarine chaser.

The vessel was transferred on May 9, 1964 along with two other boats of the same class to Turkey. Three other ships of the class followed the next year. Commissioned on January 25, 1965, the Sultanhisar was stationed at the Gölcük Naval Base together with other Hisar-class patrol boats, before they were deployed in 1977 to the naval base in İzmir.

Sultanhisar was decommissioned on June 3, 2002 as Burak-class corvettes entered service.

TCG Sultanhisar (P-111) was the third ship of the Turkish Navy to have the name, following the destroyer TCG Sultanhisar and the torpedo boat Sultanhisar.
