= TCG Sultanhisar (1940) =

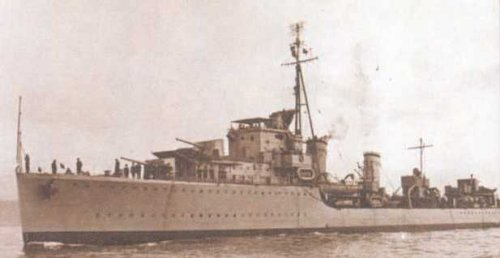
- Sultanhisar

History

Turkey
- Name: TCG Sultanhisar
- Namesake: Sultanhisar
- Builder: William Denny and Brothers at Dumbarton
- Laid down: 21 March 1939
- Launched: 17 December 1940
- Completed: 28 June 1941
- Acquired: 1942
- Decommissioned: 1960

General characteristics
- Class & type: Demirhisar-class destroyer
- Displacement: 1,360 long tons (1,380 t) (standard); 1,910 long tons (1,940 t) (deep load)
- Length: 323 ft (98.5 m)
- Beam: 33 ft (10.1 m)
- Draught: 8 ft 6 in (2.6 m)
- Installed power: 34,000 shp (25,000 kW); 3 Admiralty 3-drum boilers
- Propulsion: 2 shafts; 2 geared steam turbines
- Speed: 35.5 knots (65.7 km/h; 40.9 mph)
- Complement: 145
- Sensors & processing systems: ASDIC
- Armament: 4 × single QF 4.7-inch (120 mm) Mk IX guns; 4 × single Oerlikon 20 mm cannon; 2 × quadruple 21-inch (533 mm) torpedo tubes

TCG Sultanhisar was a Demirhisar-class destroyer built for the Turkish Navy during the Second World War. The design of her class was based on the British I class.

== Description ==
Sultanhisar displaced 1,360 long tons (1,380 t) at standard load and 1,910 long tons (1,940 t) at deep load. The ship had an overall length of 323 feet (98.5 m), a beam of 33 feet (10.1 m) and a draught of 8 feet 6 inches (2.6 m). She was powered by Parsons geared steam turbines, driving two shafts, which developed a total of 34,000 shaft horsepower (25,000 kW) and gave a maximum speed of 35.5 knots (65.7 km/h; 40.9 mph). Steam for the turbines was provided by three Admiralty three-drum boilers. Sultanhisar carried a maximum of 455 long tons (462 t) of fuel oil. The ship's complement was 145 officers and men.

The ship mounted four 45-calibre 4.7-inch (120 mm) Mark IX guns in single mounts. For anti-aircraft (AA) defence, Sultanhisar had four single mounts for Oerlikon 20 mm cannon. She was fitted with two above-water quadruple mounts for 21-inch (533 mm) torpedoes.

== Construction and career ==
Sultanhisar was one of four I-class destroyers ordered by Turkey in 1939, two of which were purchased by the Royal Navy while construction of the other two proceeded slowly. The ship was laid down at William Denny and Brothers in Dumbarton, Scotland on 21 March 1939. She was launched on 17 December 1940 and completed on 28 June 1941. The destroyer was transferred to Turkey in 1942, where she served until her decommissioning in 1960.

TCG Sultanhisar was the second ship of the Turkish Navy with the same name, following the Ottoman, and later Turkish, torpedo boat Sultanhisar.
