= Bathurst Street Wharf =

Former shipyards in Ontario, Canada

Bathurst Street Wharf was a series of shipyards located in Toronto, Ontario, Canada, between Bathurst Street and Spadina Avenue along Lake Shore Boulevard West.

== Early years ==
The first facility appeared in 1890 and the last closed at the end of World War II. In total 160 ships were built in the shipyards in the site. Now filled inland, the area is now being developed into condos along the Gardiner Expressway.

The ship building area was located near Old Fort York (where smaller vessels were built for the garrison) and Queens Wharf.

== Shipyards ==
It was not until the late 19th Century when a formal shipyard began emerging in the area. The first ship building company in the area was John Doty Company (John Doty and Sons) from 1890 to 1893. This company built 6 boats, paddle boat ferries and steamers.

Doty was acquired by Bertram Engineering Works Company in 1893 and built a large number of vessels of various sizes. Bertram sold the shipyard to Canadian Shipbuilding Company in 1905 and operated until 1908. From 1908 to 1913 shipbuilding proved to be financially challenging to the new owners Toronto Shipyards (1908–1910) and the yard was abandoned until 1913.

Thor Iron Works acquired the yards in 1913 and built only 9 ships, mainly warships and cargo ships, before being bought out in 1917 by Dominion Shipbuilding and Repair Company Limited. Prior to 1918, shipbuilding was done in wharfs and finally in a shipyard built by Dominion. However Dominion shared the same fate as Toronto Shipyards and closed in 1920 after a strike caused the shipbuilder to go bankrupt.

== Decline and closing of shipyard ==
The yards lay empty for two decades before being re-activated by the Government of Canada in 1941 to build minesweepers for the Royal Canadian Navy under the contractor Dufferin Shipbuilding Company Limited and then by federally owned Toronto Shipbuilding Company Limited. From 1943, the new owner Redfern Construction Company Limited built minesweepers for the Royal Navy. The last ship was completed in 1945 with the remainder orders cancelled. The shipbuilding industry came to a close in the area for good.

== Post-shipyard use ==
Following World War II, the area remained industrial and served as docking facilities the nearby silos. Berths were filled in and in the 1980s industry was replaced with condos, a City of Toronto park (Toronto Music Garden) and a public marina by Harbourfront Corporation. Numerous marine uses exist at Spadina Quay today (2020) including Marina Quay West, numerous passenger vessels, a few active commercial tugs, a water taxi and Boatel on board B&B accommodation.
