= List of seamounts in the Southern Ocean =

This is a list of Seamounts in the Southern Ocean. A seamount is a mountain rising from the ocean seafloor that does not reach to the water's surface (sea level), and thus is not an island, islet or Cliff-rock. Seamounts are typically formed from extinct volcanoes that rise abruptly and are usually found rising from the seafloor to 1,000–4,000 m (3,300–13,100 ft) in height. They are defined by oceanographers as independent features that rise to at least 1,000 m (3,281 ft) above the seafloor, characteristically of conical form.

== List ==
Name	Location	Date named	Name origin	Coordinates
Adare Seamounts	Balleny Basin	June 1988		70°0′S 171°30′E
Balleny Seamounts	Balleny Islands	June 1988		61°0′S 161°30′E
Barsukov Seamount		June 1995	Named for Russian scientist Valeri Barsukov	61°3′S 29°12′W
Belgica Guyot		June 1997	Named for the Belgian research ship Belgica	65°30′S 90°30′W
Dallmann Seamount		June 1997	Named for polar explorer Eduard Dallmann	67°10′S 96°53′W
De Gerlache Seamounts			Named for Lieutenant Adrien Victor Joseph de Gerlache	65°0′S 90°30′W
Hakurei Seamount	Adélie Land	July 1999	Named for the RV Hakurei-maru	62°52′S 140°49′E
Iselin Seamount		February 1964	Named for the research ship Iselin II	70°45′S 178°15′W
Kemp Caldera	Scotia Sea-Weddell Sea	2009		59°42′S 28°15′W
Lecointe Guyot		June 1997	Named for explorer Georges Lecointe	65°6′S 93°0′W
Lichtner Seamount		April 2000	Named for German cartographer Werner Lichtner	67°33′S 0°40′W
Maud Seamount		February 1964		65°0′S 2°35′E
Orca Seamount	Bransfield Strait	1967	Named for the orca whales that frequent the area	62°26′00″S 58°24′00″W
Rosenthal Seamount	Weddell Sea		Named for Alfred Rosenthal	68°38′S 97°5′W
Wordie Seamount	Bransfield Strait		Named for geologist James Wordie	61°48′S 55°27′W

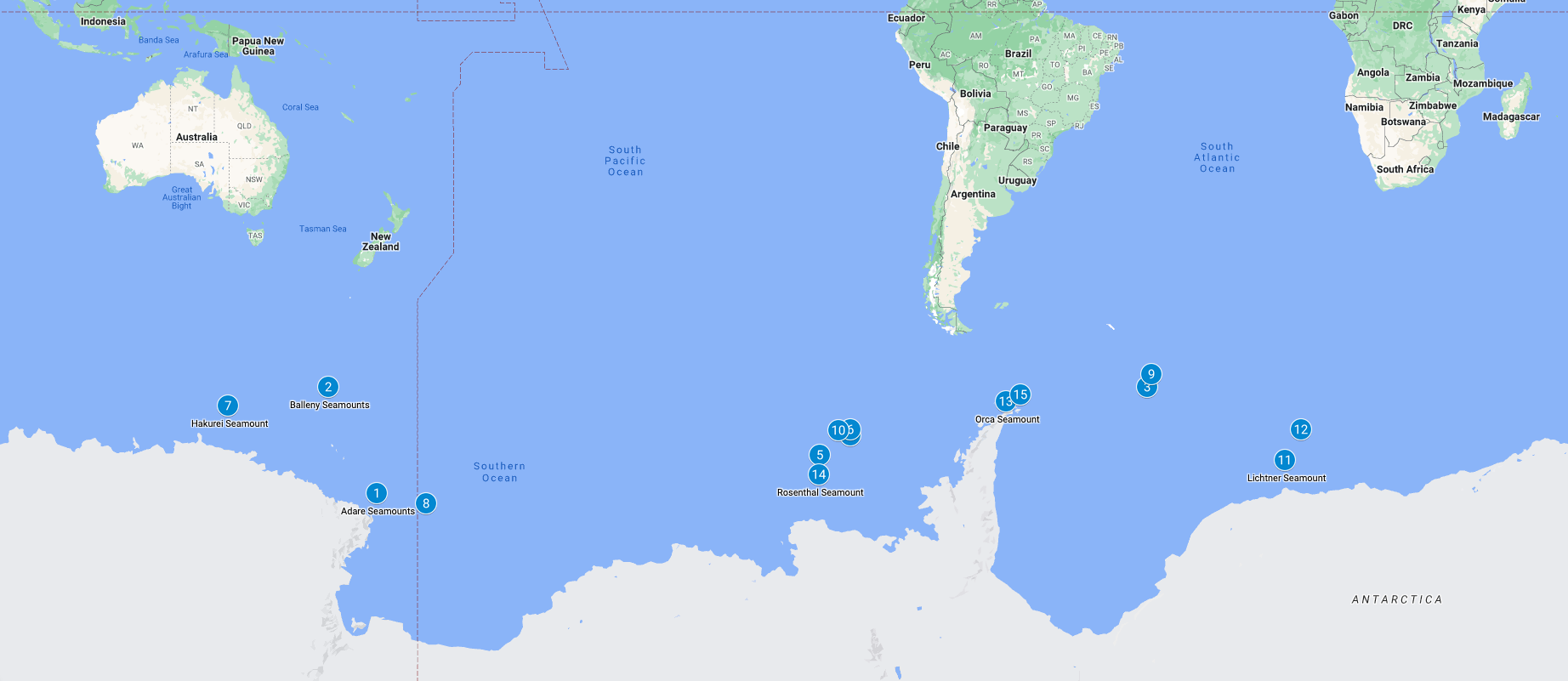
Named Seamounts of the Southern Ocean mapped.

The Seamounts plotted using Google Map overlay.

== See also ==
- List of submarine volcanoes
