= Barsukov =

Barsukov (masculine, Russian: Барсуков) or Barsukova (feminine, Russian: Барсукова) is a Russian surname. Notable people with the surname include:

- Anna Barsukova (filmmaker) (born 1981), Russian film director, screenwriter, camerawoman and musician
- Anna Barsukova (model) (born 1988), Russian entrepreneur and former fashion model
- Mikhail Barsukov (born 1947), Russian politician
- Valeri Barsukov (1928–1992), Russian Soviet scientist
- Yulia Barsukova (born 1978), Russian rhythmic gymnast

== See also ==
- Barsukov Seamount, seamount of Antarctica
