= Editha Knocker =

English violinist and teacher

Editha Grace Knocker
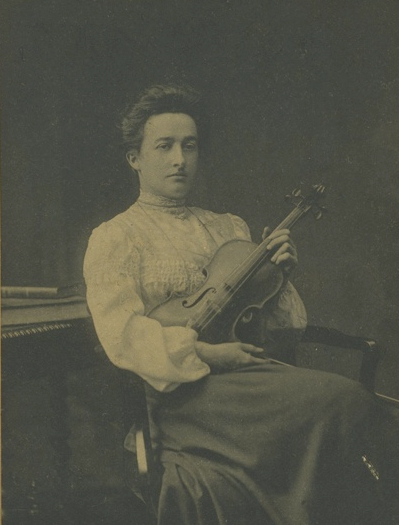
- Editha Knocker in 1906
- Born: 2 March 1869
- Died: 19 September 1950 (aged 81)
- Occupations: Violinist, conductor, teacher, author

Editha Grace Knocker (2 March 1869 – 19 September 1950) was an English violinist, conductor, teacher and author.

== Early life ==
Knocker was born in Exmouth, Devon, the youngest of six children of Royal Navy officer Hugh Horatio Knocker and Rosa Hensley (sister of Prince Edward Island politician Joseph Hensley). When Knocker was born her father was patrolling the coast of West Africa as commander of the gun vessel HMS Fly. He died of a fever at sea four months after Knocker's birth.

Knocker studied the violin with Joseph Joachim in Berlin from 1889 to 1890. Upon her return to England she settled in York, where her mother lived, and taught at various schools, including The Mount School. A diagnosis of neuritis in her arm thwarted her plans for a career as a solo performer.

== Teaching career ==
In 1898, along with T. Tertius Noble, she was one of the co-founders of the York Symphony Orchestra. She was one of the conductors of the orchestra and also played the role of lead violin.

In 1913 Knocker was invited to be an assistant to Leopold Auer at the Saint Petersburg Conservatory, but had to return to England on the outbreak of World War I in 1914. At the end of the war she moved to Hampstead in London. She taught at the Royal Academy of Music where her pupils included Watson Forbes and Sidney Griller. In 1919 she conducted the New Queen's Hall Orchestra at Wigmore Hall.

In 1926 Knocker set up her own music school in Finchley Road. Pupils included Leah Willoughby, Gerald Finzi, Phyllis Ebsworth, Basil Cameron, Jean Stewart, Mary Ibberson and Sybil Eaton. When Mary Ibberson set up the first Rural Music School, based in Hitchin, in 1929, Knocker was a member of the advisory board.

In 1932 The Times published a letter from Knocker and her friend Edith Croll with the title "Good violins lying idle". The authors wrote:

All those familiar with the teaching of music are aware of the difficulties experienced by advanced students in purchasing adequate instruments and of the discouragement experienced in consequence. There must be many good violins and violas lying idle and unused in homes throughout the country, whose owners, for sentimental or other reasons. have no wish to sell them, but who would be glad to lend them to serious students.

There was an encouraging response and Knocker and Croll were able to found the Violin Loan Scheme, which evolved into the Instrument Loan Scheme of the Benslow Music Trust.

== Later life ==
At the outbreak of World War II in 1939, Knocker and Croll moved to Croll's estate Samalaman in Glenuig on the west coast of Scotland. There Knocker translated Leopold Mozart's A Treatise on the Fundamental Principles of Violin Playing from the German.

Knocker died aged 81 at Glenuig.

== Publications ==
In 1921 Knocker published her first book, The Making of a Violinist, followed a year later by The Violin.

Knocker's translation of Leopold Mozart's A Treatise on the Fundamental Principles of Violin Playing was published in 1948.

Knocker's book Violinist's Vade Mecum was published posthumously in 1952.
