= HMCS Portage =

Reciprocating engine-powered Algerine-class minesweeper

History

Canada
- Name: Portage
- Namesake: Portage la Prairie, Manitoba
- Builder: Port Arthur Shipbuilding Co. Ltd., Port Arthur
- Laid down: 23 May 1942
- Launched: 21 November 1942
- Commissioned: 22 October 1943
- Decommissioned: 31 July 1946
- Identification: Pennant number J331
- Recommissioned: 1947
- Decommissioned: 26 September 1958
- Identification: 262
- Honours and awards: Atlantic 1944-45
- Fate: Scrapped, 1961
- Badge: Vert, in base barry wavy of four argent and azure on which a plough or

General characteristics
- Class & type: Algerine-class minesweeper
- Displacement: 1,030 long tons (1,047 t) (standard); 1,325 long tons (1,346 t) (deep)
- Length: 225 ft (69 m) o/a
- Beam: 35 ft 6 in (10.82 m)
- Draught: 12.25 ft 6 in (3.89 m)
- Installed power: 2 × Admiralty 3-drum boilers; 2,400 ihp (1,800 kW)
- Propulsion: 2 shafts; 2 vertical triple-expansion steam engines
- Speed: 16.5 knots (30.6 km/h; 19.0 mph)
- Range: 5,000 nmi (9,300 km; 5,800 mi) at 10 knots (19 km/h; 12 mph)
- Complement: 85
- Armament: 1 × QF 4 in (102 mm) Mk V anti-aircraft gun; 4 × twin Oerlikon 20 mm cannon; 1 × Hedgehog

HMCS Portage was a reciprocating engine-powered Algerine-class minesweeper built for the Royal Canadian Navy during the Second World War. Following the war, the ship saw service as a training vessel before being scrapped in 1961.

== Design and description ==
The reciprocating group displaced 1,010–1,030 long tons (1,030–1,050 t) at standard load and 1,305–1,325 long tons (1,326–1,346 t) at deep load The ships measured 225 feet (68.6 m) long overall with a beam of 35 feet 6 inches (10.8 m). They had a draught of 12 feet 3 inches (3.7 m). The ships' complement consisted of 85 officers and ratings.

The reciprocating ships had two vertical triple-expansion steam engines, each driving one shaft, using steam provided by two Admiralty three-drum boilers. The engines produced a total of 2,400 indicated horsepower (1,800 kW) and gave a maximum speed of 16.5 knots (30.6 km/h; 19.0 mph). They carried a maximum of 660 long tons (671 t) of fuel oil that gave them a range of 5,000 nautical miles (9,300 km; 5,800 mi) at 10 knots (19 km/h; 12 mph).

The Algerine class was armed with a QF 4 in (102 mm) Mk V anti-aircraft gun and four twin-gun mounts for Oerlikon 20 mm cannon. The latter guns were in short supply when the first ships were being completed and they often got a proportion of single mounts. By 1944, single-barrel Bofors 40 mm mounts began replacing the twin 20 mm mounts on a one for one basis. All of the ships were fitted for four throwers and two rails for depth charges. Many Canadian ships omitted their sweeping gear in exchange for a 24-barrel Hedgehog spigot mortar and a stowage capacity for 90+ depth charges.

== Construction and career ==
Portage, named for Portage la Prairie, Manitoba, was laid down on 23 May 1942 by Port Arthur Shipbuilding Co. Ltd. in Port Arthur, Ontario. The ship was launched on 21 November 1942 and commissioned into the Royal Canadian Navy on 22 October 1943 at Port Arthur.

After commissioning, the minesweeper sailed up the St. Lawrence River to Halifax, where she worked up near St. Margarets Bay. After completing workups, Portage was assigned to the Western Escort Force as a convoy escort in the Battle of the Atlantic. She joined escort group W-2 as Senior Officer's Ship in January 1944. As Senior Officer Ship, the commander of the escort would be aboard her during convoy missions. In mid-April, the minesweeper transferred to escort group W-3 as Senior Officer Ship, remaining with the group until October when she was sent to Liverpool, Nova Scotia for a refit.

After working up again, Portage rejoined escort group W-3 in March 1945 and remained with them until the group's disbanding in June 1945. The ship was placed in reserve first at Sydney, Nova Scotia, then Halifax where she was paid off on 31 July 1946. Following the war, the ship was recommissioned during the summer as a training vessel in 1947-48 and then year-round from 1949 to 1958, spending much of her time on the Great Lakes. In December 1951, Wallaceburg and Portage deployed to the Caribbean Sea for a training cruise, making port visits at Bermuda and Nassau. In February 1953, Portage, with Quebec and Huron sailed to Bermuda for training with the Royal Navy submarine Andrew. In June 1953, Wallaceburg and Portage sailed to Bermuda for a training exercise with the American submarine Irex. On 15 April 1955, Portage, Wallaceburg and Minas were assigned to the Eleventh Canadian Escort Squadron based out of Halifax. On 26 September 1958, Portage was paid off for the final time and was scrapped at Sorel, Quebec in 1961.

== See also ==
- List of ships of the Canadian Navy

== Bibliography ==
- Arbuckle, J. Graeme (1987). Badges of the Canadian Navy. Halifax, Nova Scotia: Nimbus Publishing. ISBN 0-920852-49-1.
- Burn, Alan (1999). The Fighting Commodores: The Convoy Commanders in the Second World War. London: Leo Cooper. ISBN 9780850525045.
- Chesneau, Roger, ed. (1980). Conway's All the World's Fighting Ships 1922–1946. Greenwich, UK: Conway Maritime Press. ISBN 0-85177-146-7.
- Colledge, J. J.; Warlow, Ben (2006) [1969]. Ships of the Royal Navy: The Complete Record of All Fighting Ships of the Royal Navy from the 15th Century to the Present (3rd Rev ed.). London: Chatham Publishing. ISBN 978-1-86176-281-8. OCLC 67375475.
- Lenton, H. T. (1998). British & Empire Warships of the Second World War. Annapolis, Maryland: Naval Institute Press. ISBN 1-55750-048-7.
- Macpherson, Ken; Barrie, Ron (2002). The Ships of Canada's Naval Forces 1910-2002 (3 ed.). St. Catharines, Ontario: Vanwell Publishing. ISBN 1-55125-072-1.
