= German Antarctic Expedition =

German Antarctic Expedition can refer to:

- Eduard Dallmann's expedition of 1873–74, in Grönland
- First German Antarctic Expedition of 1901–03
- Second German Antarctic Expedition of 1911–13
- Third German Antarctic Expedition of 1938
