= HMS Fly =

Sixteen ships of the Royal Navy have borne the name HMS Fly:

- HMS Fly (1648) was a six-gun sloop, built in 1648 and last listed in 1652.
- HMS Fly (1672) was a six-gun dogger captured from the Dutch in 1672 and wrecked in 1673.
- HMS Fly (1694) was a six-gun advice boat built in 1694 and wrecked in 1695.
- HMS Fly (1696) was a four-gun ketch built in 1696 and sold in 1712.
- HMS Fly (1732) was a 12-gun sloop launched in 1732 and broken up in 1750.
- HMS Fly (1752) was an eight-gun sloop launched in 1752 and sold in 1772.
- HMS Fly (1763) was a cutter purchased in 1763 and sold in 1771.
- HMS Fly (1776) was a 14-gun sloop launched in 1776 and foundered off the Newfoundland coast in 1801 or 1802.
- HMS Fly (1778) was a 14-gun cutter purchased in 1780 and captured by the French in May 1781.
- HMS Fly (1804) was an 18-gun sloop launched in 1804 and wrecked in March 1805 on the Carysfort Reef in the Gulf of Florida; her crew were saved.
- HMS Fly (1805) was a 16-gun brig-sloop launched in 1805. In 1807 she participated in one major naval campaign. She was wrecked on 28 February 1812 at Anholt Island in the Kattegat.
- HMS Fly (1813) was a Cruizer-class brig-sloop launched in 1813 and sold in 1828.
- HMS Fly (1831) was an 18-gun sloop launched in 1831. She was converted into a coal hulk in 1855, after which she was renamed C2 and then C70. She was broken up in 1903.
- HMS Fly (1856) was a wooden Albacore-class screw gunboat launched in 1856 and broken up in 1862.
- HMS Fly (1867) was a Beacon-class gunvessel launched in 1867 and sold in 1887.
- HMS Fly (J306) was an Algerine-class minesweeper launched in 1942. She was sold to Iran in 1949 and renamed Palang. She was paid off in 1966 and stricken from the navy list in 1972. She sank and was then broken up.
