= HMCS Wallaceburg =

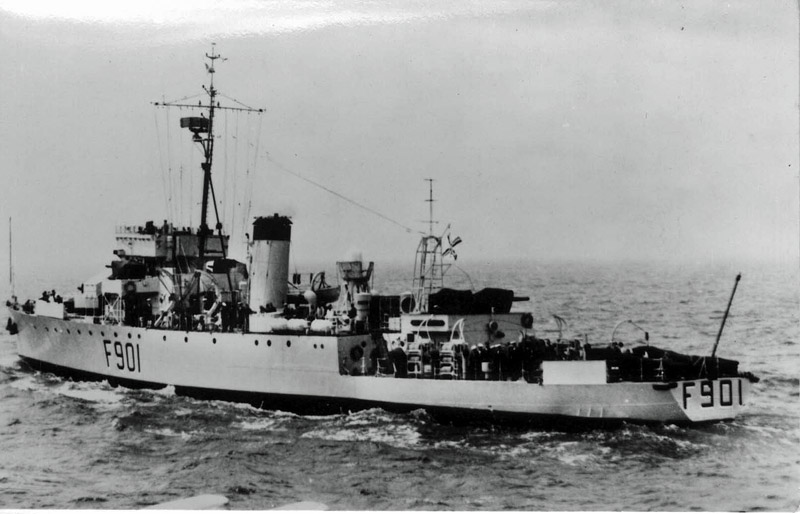
- As Belgian Georges Lecointe

History

Canada
- Name: Wallaceburg
- Namesake: Wallaceburg, Ontario
- Ordered: 12 December 1941
- Builder: Port Arthur Shipbuilding Co. Ltd., Port Arthur
- Laid down: 6 July 1942
- Launched: 17 December 1942
- Commissioned: 18 November 1943
- Decommissioned: 7 October 1946
- Identification: Pennant number: J 336
- Recommissioned: 1 November 1950
- Decommissioned: 24 September 1957
- Identification: pennant number: FSE 172
- Honours and awards: Atlantic 1944-45
- Fate: Sold to Belgian Navy
- Badge: Gules, a demi lion erased argent with a chaplet of oak and maple leaves or.

Belgium
- Name: Georges Lecointe
- Namesake: Georges Lecointe
- Acquired: 31 July 1959
- Commissioned: 7 August 1959
- Decommissioned: 1969
- Stricken: 23 December 1970
- Identification: 901
- Fate: Sold for scrap

General characteristics
- Class & type: Algerine-class minesweeper
- Displacement: 1,030 long tons (1,047 t) (standard); 1,325 long tons (1,346 t) (deep)
- Length: 225 ft (69 m) o/a
- Beam: 35 ft 6 in (10.82 m)
- Draught: 12.25 ft 6 in (3.89 m)
- Installed power: 2 × Admiralty 3-drum boilers; 2,400 ihp (1,800 kW)
- Propulsion: 2 shafts; 2 vertical triple-expansion steam engines
- Speed: 16.5 knots (30.6 km/h; 19.0 mph)
- Range: 5,000 nmi (9,300 km; 5,800 mi) at 10 knots (19 km/h; 12 mph)
- Complement: Royal Canadian Navy: 9 officers, 88 crew; Belgian Navy: 9 officers, 37 sub-officers, 55 crew
- Armament: 1 × QF 4 in (102 mm) Mk V anti-aircraft gun; 4 × twin Oerlikon 20 mm cannon; 1 × Hedgehog

HMCS Wallaceburg was an Algerine-class minesweeper that served in the Royal Canadian Navy during the Second World War as a convoy escort during the Battle of the Atlantic. After the war the vessel was used from 1950 to 1959 for cadet training. In 1959 she was sold to the Belgian Navy and served until 1969 as Georges Lecointe, the second ship to be named after Georges Lecointe.

== Design and description ==
The reciprocating group of the Algerine-class minesweepers displaced 1,010–1,030 long tons (1,030–1,050 t) at standard load and 1,305–1,325 long tons (1,326–1,346 t) at deep load The ships measured 225 feet (68.6 m) long overall with a beam of 35 feet 6 inches (10.8 m). They had a draught of 12 feet 3 inches (3.7 m). The ships' complement consisted of 85 officers and ratings.

The reciprocating ships had two vertical triple-expansion steam engines, each driving one shaft, using steam provided by two Admiralty three-drum boilers. The engines produced a total of 2,400 indicated horsepower (1,800 kW) and gave a maximum speed of 16.5 knots (30.6 km/h; 19.0 mph). They carried a maximum of 660 long tons (671 t) of fuel oil that gave them a range of 5,000 nautical miles (9,300 km; 5,800 mi) at 10 knots (19 km/h; 12 mph).

The Algerine class was armed with a QF 4 in (102 mm) Mk V anti-aircraft gun and four twin-gun mounts for Oerlikon 20 mm (0.79 in) cannon. The latter guns were in short supply when the first ships were being completed and they often got a proportion of single mounts. By 1944, single-barrel Bofors 40 mm (1.6 in) mounts began replacing the twin 20 mm mounts on a one for one basis. All of the ships were fitted for four throwers and two rails for depth charges. Many Canadian ships omitted their minesweeping gear in exchange for a 24-barrel Hedgehog spigot mortar and a stowage capacity for 90+ depth charges.

== Service history ==
=== Royal Canadian Navy ===
Wallaceburg was ordered on 12 December 1941. The ship was laid down on 6 July 1942 by Port Arthur Shipbuilding Company Ltd. at Port Arthur, Ontario and launched on 17 December later that year. The vessel was commissioned into the Royal Canadian Navy on 18 November 1943 at Port Arthur.

After commissioning Wallaceburg worked up around Halifax. Upon completion of her trials, the vessel was assigned to the Western Escort Force. She initially joined escort group W-8 in February 1944 before joining group W-6, where she became the Senior Officer's Ship. As Senior Officer Ship, the commander of the escort would be aboard her during convoy missions.

In December 1944, Wallaceburg was reassigned to escort group W-8 and remained with the group until July 1945. In July and August 1945, the vessel was attached to HMCS Cornwallis as a training vessel before being placed in reserve at Sydney, Nova Scotia. The ship was transferred to Halifax and paid off on 7 October 1946. While in reserve, Wallaceburg was maintained as the depot ship for the reserve fleet. In November 1950, Wallaceburg was recommissioned as a cadet training vessel, operating out of Halifax. The vessel returned to reserve, acting as a depot ship before being reactivated again on 4 April 1951 during the Korean War.

Following reactivation, the minesweeper went on a training cruise to Philadelphia. In December 1951, Wallaceburg and Portage deployed to the Caribbean Sea for a training cruise, making port visits at Bermuda and Nassau. In April 1952, Wallaceburg participated in a naval exercise off the coast of Charleston, South Carolina. In June 1953, Wallaceburg and Portage sailed to Bermuda for a training exercise with the American submarine Irex. On 15 April 1955, Wallaceburg, Portage and Minas were assigned to the Eleventh Canadian Escort Squadron based out of Halifax. She spent the summers of 1956 and 1957 on the Great Lakes. The ship was paid off again on 24 September 1957.

=== Belgian Navy ===
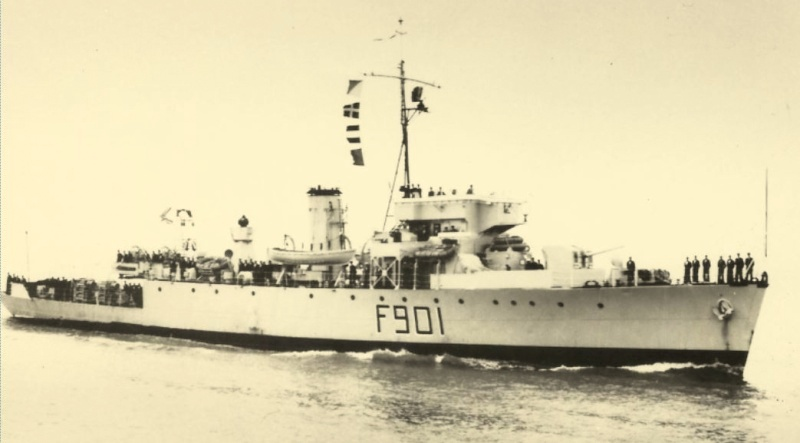
Georges Lecointe with unchanged main gun

On 31 July 1959, Wallaceburg was sold to Belgium and renamed Georges Lecointe. Upon acquisition, the vessel was re-designated a coastal escort and had the 20 mm anti-aircraft armament replaced with 40 mm anti-aircraft guns in single mounts. In 1960 she participated in operations in Congo, as the flagship. In 1966 the vessel had the 4-inch main gun replaced with another 40 mm gun. She remained in service until 1969 when she was discarded. She was sold in 1970 for breaking up.

== See also ==
- List of ships of the Canadian Navy
