= HMS Mutine (J227) =

Minesweeper of the Royal Navy

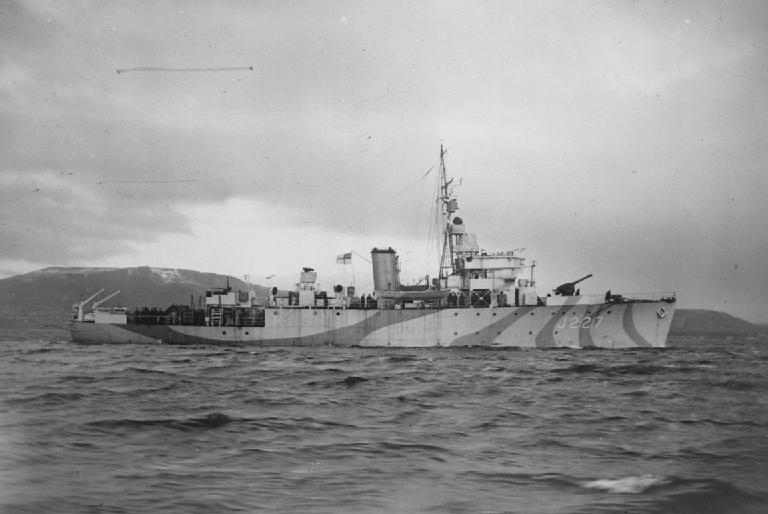

History

United Kingdom
- Name: HMS Mutine
- Ordered: 15 November 1940
- Builder: Harland & Wolff, Belfast, Northern Ireland
- Yard number: 1140
- Laid down: 24 November 1941
- Launched: 10 October 1942
- Completed: 26 February 1943
- Commissioned: 26 February 1943
- Recommissioned: Reactivated in April 1956
- Out of service: Reduced to reserve in 1946
- Identification: Pennant number J227
- Fate: Sold for scrapping on 13 December 1966
- Badge: On a Field White, a dragon’s head erased proper

General characteristics
- Class & type: Algerine-class minesweeper
- Displacement: 850 tons
- Length: 225 ft (69 m)
- Beam: 35 ft 6 in (10.82 m)
- Propulsion: Geared turbines; two shafts; 2,000 ihp (1.5 MW)
- Complement: 85 men
- Armament: 1 × QF 4 in (102 mm) Mk V anti-aircraft gun; 4 × 20 mm guns (4x1)

HMS Mutine was a turbine-powered Algerine-class minesweeper of the Royal Navy. She served during the Second World War, and was adopted by the civil community of Mitcham, Surrey following a successful Warship Week National Savings campaign held in February 1942.

== Design and description ==
The turbine-powered group displaced 850 long tons (860 t) at standard load and 1,125 long tons (1,143 t) at deep load. The ships measured 225 feet (68.6 m) long overall with a beam of 35 feet 6 inches (10.8 m). They had a draught of 11 feet (3.4 m). The ships' complement consisted of 85 officers and ratings.

The ships had two Parsons geared steam turbines, each driving one shaft, using steam provided by two Admiralty three-drum boilers. The engines produced a total of 2,000 shaft horsepower (1,500 kW) and gave a maximum speed of 16.5 knots (30.6 km/h; 19.0 mph). They carried a maximum of 660 long tons (671 t) of fuel oil that gave them a range of 5,000 nautical miles (9,300 km; 5,800 mi) at 10 knots (19 km/h; 12 mph).

The Algerine class was armed with a QF 4 in (102 mm) Mk V anti-aircraft gun and four twin-gun mounts for Oerlikon 20 mm cannon. The latter guns were in short supply when the first ships were being completed and they often got a proportion of single mounts. By 1944, single-barrel Bofors 40 mm mounts began replacing the twin 20 mm mounts on a one for one basis. All of the ships were fitted for four throwers and two rails for depth charges.

== Career ==
=== Construction and early career ===
Mutine was built by Harland & Wolff, in Belfast, Northern Ireland and launched on 10 October 1942. After completing her working up trials she was assigned to the 12th Minesweeping Flotilla and was deployed in Home waters. She only spent a couple of months here before travelling to the Mediterranean in May 1943 to join the minesweeping flotilla at Bizerta.

=== The Mediterranean ===
Here she cleared passages through the Galita and Sicilian channels to allow the passage of convoys to and from the eastern Mediterranean. Mutine was also nominated to carry out minesweeping and escort duties for the Allied landings in Sicily. For these operations she was detached from the flotilla and carried out these duties in mid July in company with her sisters Fly, Espiegle and Cadmus. She returned to her normal duties in August.

In September Mutine supported the Allied landings at Salerno. She was slightly damaged by a near miss from shore fire on 8 September whilst sweeping for mines off the beachhead. On 16 September she carried out sweeping operations in the Bay of Naples with her flotilla. Together they managed to clear 135 mines in the Salerno area. At the end of September she sailed for Capri. On 1 October Mutine was deployed in support of operations off the west coast of Sicily. These duties included mine clearance of positions to be used by Allied warships for bombardments prior to military advances. During these activities, the minesweepers often came under fire from shore batteries and air attacks. She carried out these duties into December, when she was moved to the Anzio area to support Operation Shingle, the planned allied landings. She carried out sweeping duties in January, in company with Rinaldo and Waterwitch of the 19th Flotilla and Bude and Rothesay of the 13th Flotilla. Mutine carried out these duties until March, followed by sweeping duties off Malta.

June was spent clearing the entrance to the port of Civitavecchia and elsewhere off the Italian coast to clear passages for ships supporting the military advance. In July she cleared a passage into Livorno. Altogether 250 mines were cleared from the various minesweepers engaged in these operations, often while under fire from the shore. The later part of the year saw Mutine carrying out sweeping duties off Greece and the Eastern Mediterranean. In October the ships of Mutine's flotilla were congratulated by the Supreme Commander, Mediterranean, for having swept 1013 mines. Further work in the Aegean Sea followed, where Mutine suffered slight damage while sweeping one of the new German 'Oboe' mines. On 17 December Mutine, Fly and Albacore swept a passage through the Dardanelles to ensure safe passage for the warships taking Winston Churchill and Franklin D. Roosevelt to the Yalta Conference to meet Joseph Stalin. Mutine spent Christmas 1944 in Mudros.

In January 1945 Mutine returned to Malta with Fly and then moved on to resume mine clearance off the Greek mainland with the rest of her Flotilla. She carried out these duties until March, moving to the Italian coast in April to continue sweeping duties. In May she swept the port of Genoa and on 9 May Mutine became the first major warship to enter Genoa. She spent the rest of the war in the Gulf of Genoa carrying out sweeping operations.

=== Post war ===
Mutine remained in the Mediterranean sweeping mines until 1946, when she returned to the UK with the rest of her flotilla. She was paid off at Sheerness and reduced to the reserve, being laid up at Harwich. She was recommissioned in April 1956 to replace Lysander for minesweeping training at Portsmouth. After this requirement ended, Mutine was used as a ship target for aircraft training and returned to the reserve at Chatham. She was refitted for use as an anti-submarine escort in 1958-9 but was never recommissioned, and was put up for disposal in 1966. She was sold for scrapping on 13 December 1966, and was towed to Barrow-in-Furness, arriving on 7 April 1967 to be broken up.
