= Sybil Eaton =

British violinist

- Born: 17 February 1897; Stamford, Lincolnshire
- Died: 6 September 1989 (aged 92); London
- Occupations: Violinist and teacher
- Employer: Council for the Encouragement of Music and the Arts (The Music Travellers)

Sybil Eaton (17 February 1897 – 6 September 1989) was a British violinist and violin teacher. Eaton was a performer and coordinator for the Music Travellers, a wartime initiative created by the Council for the Encouragement of Music and the Arts.

== Life ==
Sybil Evelyn Eaton was born in Stamford, Lincolnshire on 17 February 1897. She was related to Elizabeth Browning on her father's side. She began learning piano aged six, and the violin aged eight. In May, 1914, she attended Leopold Auer's summer school at Loschwitz, and though prevented from continuing to study under him, at home in England she spent six years learning from Editha Knocker. Eaton performed in 1917, when she gave three recitals. Soon after, she appeared at the Promenade Concerts and the Royal Albert Hall. The Annual Register of 1917 wrote that "the arrival of two violinists so capable as Sybil Eaton and Tessie Thomas should assuredly be recorded".

Between 1920 and 1923, ill health caused Eaton to retire from public work.

Eaton also formed a string quartet, which gave fortnightly recitals for schools at the BBC.

A 1982 profile of Eaton in The Strad wrote that there could be "few musicians in this country so universally loved by professionals and amateurs alike as Sybil Eaton". Charles Villiers Stanford, Herbert Howells, Armstrong Gibbs, Pamela Hind O'Malley, and Gerald Finzi all composed pieces for her.

== Wartime and The Music Travellers ==
Eaton was involved in the Rural Music School movement founded by Mary Ibberson in 1929, including with the Wiltshire Rural Music School During World War II, the movement helped to inspire the introduction by the Council for the Encouragement of Music and the Arts of the "Music Travellers" - intended to raise morale among the British population. Under the auspices of the Rural Music Schools, the Music Travellers were led by Eaton. Concerts were arranged in teacher training colleges, and visits by the London Philharmonic and London Symphony Orchestras to smaller towns and industrial areas were organised. A start was made in sending soloists or small groups of instrumentalists to factory canteens.

The Music Travellers were described as being "remarkably successful in... efforts to make music and to help music to be made". During the first six months of 1940, The Music Travellers started 37 new orchestral groups and 244 new choral groups, as well as helping to organize 254 concerts and festivals, attended by over 40,000 people.

The Music Travellers were cut significantly in 1943, and disbanded the following year, when they were replaced by regional officers. Eaton wrote of her disappointment at the end of the project:

The cut in money for direct concerts is a shattering blow... Now, having created the demand, mobilised the enthusiasts and built up audiences, the cut has come, without warning... It will strain all our loyalty to CEMA to explain the sudden change without causing bitter resentment, and it will take all our courage to go on, refusing people we have taught to ask, breaking promises wholesale, with our dream of taking music to our whole region shattered.

In 1945, a concert was held in Eaton's honour, featuring the Menges String Quartet and Margaret Ritchie. Ralph Vaughan Williams and Steuart Wilson spoke in praise of Eaton's work for music during the war.

== Death and legacy ==
In his 1982 autobiography, composer Christopher Le Fleming wrote:

For us in Wiltshire, as for so many elsewhere, Sybil Eaton will long be remembered with affection and admiration. The combination of brilliant and eloquent playing, allied to charm of manner, provided the essential vitamins needed to encourage the often difficult task of getting small isolated instrumental groups ‘off the ground.’ Sybil would offer two or three days and, in exchange for transport and hospitality, play to school and village audiences.

Sybil Eaton died on 6 September 1989. A memorial service was held at the Savoy Chapel was held in October. A collection of her papers were donated to the Dartington Hall Archive, and are held by the Devon Heritage Centre.
