= Anna Barsukova =

Anna Barsukova may refer to:

- Anna Barsukova (filmmaker) (born 1981), Russian film director
- Anna Barsukova (model) (born 1988), Russian entrepreneur and fashion model
