= Rosenthal Seamount =

Seamount in the Weddell Sea named for Alfred Rosenthal

Rosenthal Seamount (68°38′S 97°5′W) is a seamount in the Weddell Sea named for Alfred Rosenthal (1828–1882), a German captain and ship owner. Rosenthal helped to finance and coordinate Eduard Dallmann's Antarctic voyages.

== Background ==
The seamount's name was proposed by Dr. Heinrich Hinze, Alfred Wegener Institute for Polar and Marine Research, Bremerhaven, Germany. The name was ame approved in June 1997 (ACUF 271). The minimal depth is 2770m.
