= George Dickinson Hadley =

English gastroenterologist

George Dickinson Hadley FRCP
- Born: June 30, 1908; Birmingham, England
- Died: August 14, 1984 (aged 76)
- Education: Cambridge University (MD)
- Occupation: Gastroenterologist
- Years active: 1939-1979
- Organization: Middlesex Hospital
- Known for: Introducing the gastrocamera into English medicine
- Spouse: Jean Stewart 1947
- Honours: Munk's Roll

George Dickinson Hadley FRCP (30 June 1908 – 14 August 1984) was an English gastroenterologist. He served in the Royal Army Medical Corps during the Second World War and was taken prisoner during the Dunkirk evacuation. He made several failed escape attempts during his incarceration. In 1963 he introduced the gastrocamera to Britain, thus enabling the development of endoscopy in that country.

== Early life and family ==
George Dickinson Hadley, known as "Dicken" at home, was born on 30 June 1908, the son of Laurence Hadley, editor of the Birmingham Post. He was educated at King Edward VI School, Birmingham, and then at Clare College, Cambridge, from where he earned a first class honours degree in natural sciences.

He married Jean Stewart in 1947, who was a professional viola player, and they had three daughters who all played instruments. The composer Ralph Vaughan Williams later became a patient and confidant. Hadley inherited a library of fishing books from his father which he rebound and he was a fly-fisher himself as well as having an interest in oriental rugs. In later life he became so proficient at book-binding that dealers sent their books to him to work on.

== Medical career ==
Hadley was house physician to Charles Lakin and house surgeon to Gordon Gordon-Taylor. Between 1936 and 1938 he became an Elmore research student at Cambridge and established his lifelong interest in peptic ulcers. Subsequently, he became registrar to Donald Hunter at the London Hospital.

At the start of the Second World War in 1939, he joined the Royal Army Medical Corps. He was captured during the Dunkirk evacuation and spent the rest of the war as a prisoner despite several escape attempts. Being of a professional standard in cello and with instruments provided by the Red Cross, he helped establish an orchestra in his prisoner of war camp. Having plenty of time on his hands, he was also closely involved in the prisoners' observations of nesting birds, the studies of which found their way into the Collins New Naturalist book series after the war. His war-time experience greatly affected him, however, and he turned from a pre-war "typical medical student – outgoing with a love of fast cars" to an "intensely shy and often monosyllabic" man who developed a "reputation for epigrammatic description" from which he partly recovered with the help of his wife.

After the war, Hadley became resident medical officer at the Middlesex Hospital. A year later, he was appointed assistant physician, and was later chosen to be physician at the Canadian Red Cross Hospital, Taplow. He used the Hermon Taylor and Schindler instruments from 1949 and imported the first gastrocamera to Britain from Japan in 1963. He went on to be a pioneer of fibreoptic endoscopy. His 1967 paper with L.M. Blendis and A.J. Cameron in Gut, titled "Analysis of 400 examinations using the gastrocamera", was described by the editors as confirming "the claim that the use of the gastrocamera is a safe, simple, and easily learnt technique which has been found to be of considerable value in the diagnosis of gastric diseases."

== Later life ==
Hadley was seriously ill in his last five years and died at his home in London on 14 August 1984. He received an obituary in the British Medical Journal and is recorded in Munk's Roll. His funeral was at Putney Vale Crematorium in Roehampton, London.

== Selected publications ==
- "Analysis of 400 examinations using the gastrocamera", Gut, 1967, 8, pp. 83–87. (With L.M. Blendis and A.J. Cameron)
