= HMS Fly (J306) =

Algerine-class minesweeper

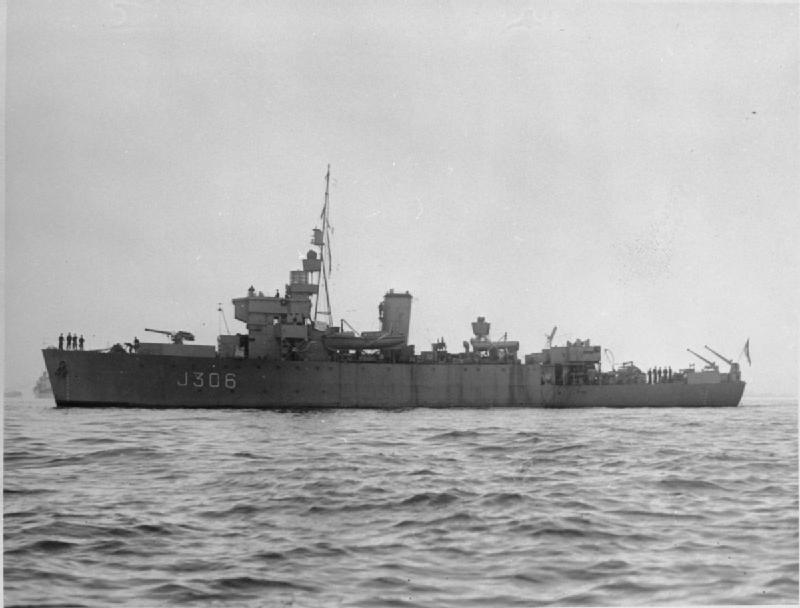
- HMS Fly (J306)

History

United Kingdom
- Name: Fly
- Namesake: Fly
- Ordered: 27 May 1941
- Builder: Lobnitz & Company, Renfrew
- Laid down: 6 October 1941
- Launched: 1 June 1942
- Commissioned: 10 October 1942
- Decommissioned: February 1947
- Identification: Pennant number: J306
- Fate: Sold to Iran, 1949

Iran
- Name: Palang; (پلنگ)
- Namesake: Palang
- Acquired: 30 July 1949
- Commissioned: 30 July 1949
- Decommissioned: 1966
- Stricken: 1972
- Fate: Scrapped, 1972

General characteristics
- Class & type: Algerine-class minesweeper
- Displacement: 1,030 long tons (1,047 t) (standard); 1,325 long tons (1,346 t) (deep)
- Length: 225 ft (69 m) o/a
- Beam: 35 ft 6 in (10.82 m)
- Draught: 12.25 ft 6 in (3.89 m)
- Installed power: 2 × Admiralty 3-drum boilers; 2,400 ihp (1,800 kW)
- Propulsion: 2 shafts; 2 vertical triple-expansion steam engines
- Speed: 16.5 knots (30.6 km/h; 19.0 mph)
- Range: 5,000 nmi (9,300 km; 5,800 mi) at 10 knots (19 km/h; 12 mph)
- Complement: 85
- Armament: 1 × QF 4 in (102 mm) Mk V anti-aircraft gun; 4 × twin Oerlikon 20 mm cannon

HMS Fly (J306) was a reciprocating engine-powered Algerine-class minesweeper during the Second World War. She survived the war and was sold to Iran in 1949 as IIS Palang.

== Design and description ==
The reciprocating group displaced 1,010–1,030 long tons (1,030–1,050 t) at standard load and 1,305–1,325 long tons (1,326–1,346 t) at deep load The ships measured 225 feet (68.6 m) long overall with a beam of 35 feet 6 inches (10.8 m). They had a draught of 12 feet 3 inches (3.7 m). The ships' complement consisted of 85 officers and ratings.

The reciprocating ships had two vertical triple-expansion steam engines, each driving one shaft, using steam provided by two Admiralty three-drum boilers. The engines produced a total of 2,400 indicated horsepower (1,800 kW) and gave a maximum speed of 16.5 knots (30.6 km/h; 19.0 mph). They carried a maximum of 660 long tons (671 t) of fuel oil that gave them a range of 5,000 nautical miles (9,300 km; 5,800 mi) at 10 knots (19 km/h; 12 mph).

The Algerine class was armed with a QF 4 in (102 mm) Mk V anti-aircraft gun and four twin-gun mounts for Oerlikon 20 mm cannon. The latter guns were in short supply when the first ships were being completed and they often got a proportion of single mounts. By 1944, single-barrel Bofors 40 mm mounts began replacing the twin 20 mm mounts on a one for one basis. All of the ships were fitted for four throwers and two rails for depth charges.

== Construction and career ==
=== Service in the Royal Navy ===
The ship was ordered on 27 May 1941 at the Lobnitz & Company at Renfrew, Scotland. She was laid down on 6 October 1941 and launched on 1 June 1942. She was commissioned on 10 October 1942.

On 2 November, she conducted anti-submarine exercise off Tobermory together with the submarine HMS H43. Few days later on the 6th, HMS Racehorse joined the two ships in the exercise. The next day, Racehorse was replaced by HMS Eriskay.

In 1946, she was put into the 12th Minesweeper Flotilla as their flotilla leader together with HMS Cadmus, HMS Acute, HMS Circe, HMS Albacore and HMS Mutine. The flotilla was dispatched to sweep the mine fields off the French, Dutch coast and islands.

Fly was decommissioned by the Navy in February 1947 and put into the reserve fleet.

On 30 July 1949, the ship was sold to the Persian Navy.

=== Service in the Persian Navy ===
She was reclassified as a frigate and renamed IIS Palang after being acquired by the Navy.

In 1966, Palang was decommissioned by the Navy.

In 1972, the ship was stricken and sold for scrap.

== Bibliography ==
- Chesneau, Roger, ed. (1980). Conway's All the World's Fighting Ships 1922–1946. Greenwich, UK: Conway Maritime Press. ISBN 0-85177-146-7.
- Colledge, J. J.; Warlow, Ben (2006) [1969]. Ships of the Royal Navy: The Complete Record of All Fighting Ships of the Royal Navy from the 15th Century to the Present (3rd Rev ed.). London: Chatham Publishing. ISBN 978-1-86176-281-8. OCLC 67375475.
- Elliott, Peter (1977). Allied Escort Ships of World War II: A complete survey. London: Macdonald and Jane's. ISBN 0-356-08401-9.
- Lenton, H. T. (1998). British & Empire Warships of the Second World War. Annapolis, Maryland: Naval Institute Press. ISBN 1-55750-048-7.
