= Jean Stewart (violist) =

English viola player (1914–2002)

- Born: February 17, 1914; Tonbridge, England
- Died: December 28, 2002 (aged 88)
- Occupation: Violist

Jean Stewart (17 February 1914 – 28 December 2002) was an English viola player. She played in chamber music and orchestral music, and appeared as a soloist; Ralph Vaughan Williams dedicated a string quartet to her.

== Life ==
Jean Stewart was born in Tonbridge in 1914, daughter of the musician and cricketer Haldane Stewart. She was educated at Headington School in Oxford, and at Stratford House in Kent, and was a student at the music school in London run by the violinist Editha Knocker. She won a Leverhulme scholarship to the Royal College of Music, where she was a pupil of the violinist Isolde Menges. During her time there she turned from the violin to the viola, and studied with the violist Ernest Tomlinson.

She played with the Leighton Quartet, whose leader was Irene Richards. In 1941 she was recommended by Ivor James, her chamber music teacher at the Royal College of Music, to the Menges Quartet (founded by Isolde Menges), to stand in for their regular viola player who was ill; she became their permanent violist.

Ralph Vaughan Williams dedicated to her his Second String Quartet in A minor, with the words "For Jean on her birthday". It was first performed on 12 October 1944 (Vaughan Williams's birthday) by the Menges Quartet. In a letter to Vaughan Williams, after receiving the music and before the performance, she wrote "Without exaggeration this Quartet is the most lovely thing that has happened to me in my life".

From 1947 she played with the Richards Piano Quartet, led by Irene Richards, after her death led by Nona Liddell.

In 1947 Jean Stewart married George Dickinson Hadley, a physician. They had three daughters. From 1956, for six years, she did not play regularly, to devote time to her family.

In later years she was a successful chamber music coach. She played in chamber orchestras, including the Harvey Phillips String Orchestra, the English Chamber Orchestra, the London Bach Orchestra and the Monteverdi Orchestra, later renamed the English Baroque Soloists. She appeared as soloist in music written for her: Elegiac Meditation for viola and string orchestra by Robin Milford, Sonata for unaccompanied viola by Elisabeth Lutyens, and Sonata in C minor for viola and piano by Julius Harrison.
