= HMCS Fredericton (K245) =

British Flower-class corvette

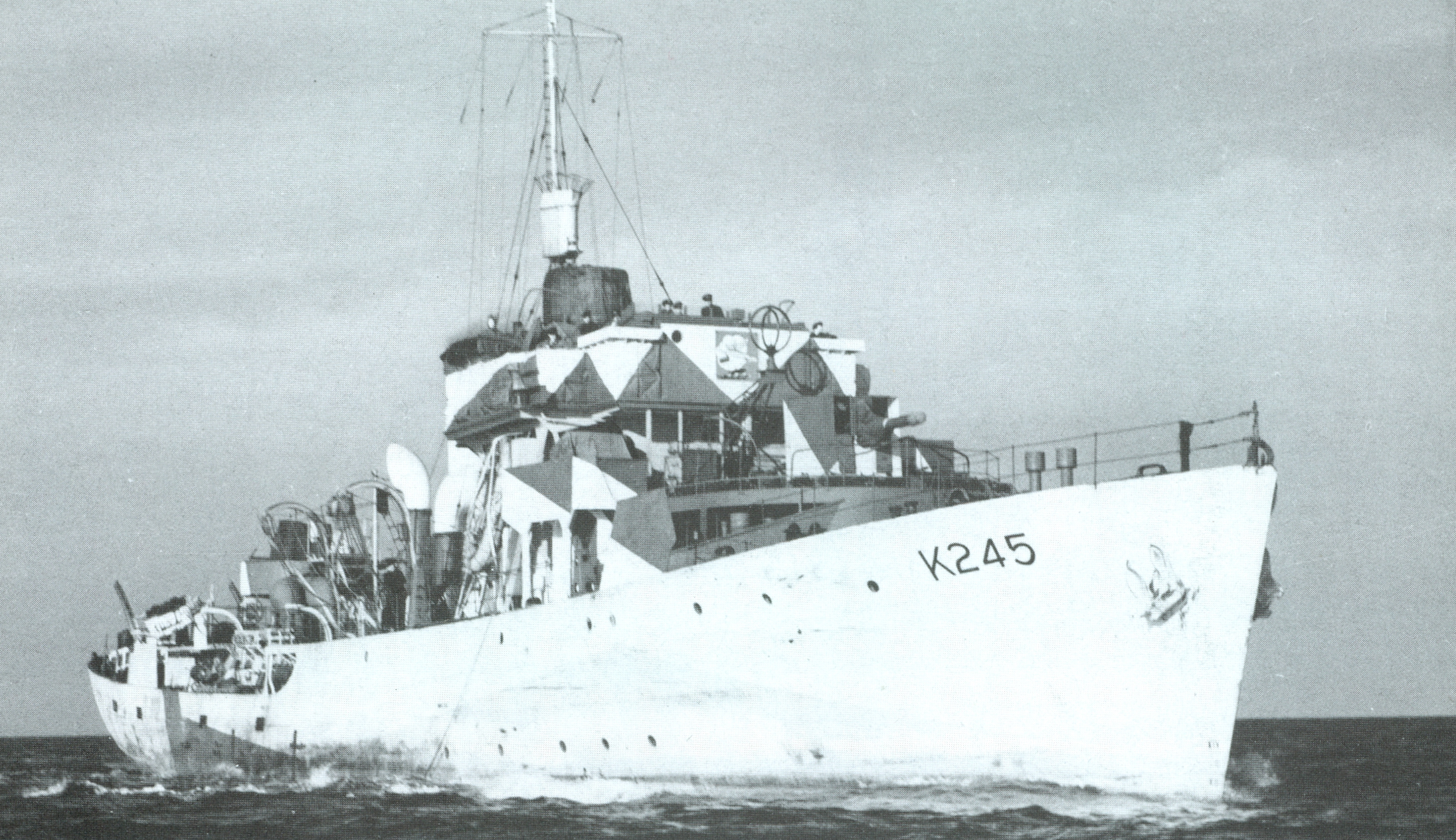
- HMCS Fredericton in November 1943

History

Canada
- Name: Fredericton
- Namesake: Fredericton, New Brunswick
- Operator: Royal Canadian Navy
- Builder: Marine Industries Ltd., Sorel
- Cost: $600,000 CAN
- Laid down: 22 March 1941
- Launched: 2 September 1941
- Commissioned: 8 December 1941
- Decommissioned: 14 July 1945
- Identification: Pennant number: K245
- Honours and awards: Atlantic 1942–45
- Fate: Special: See text for Disposition
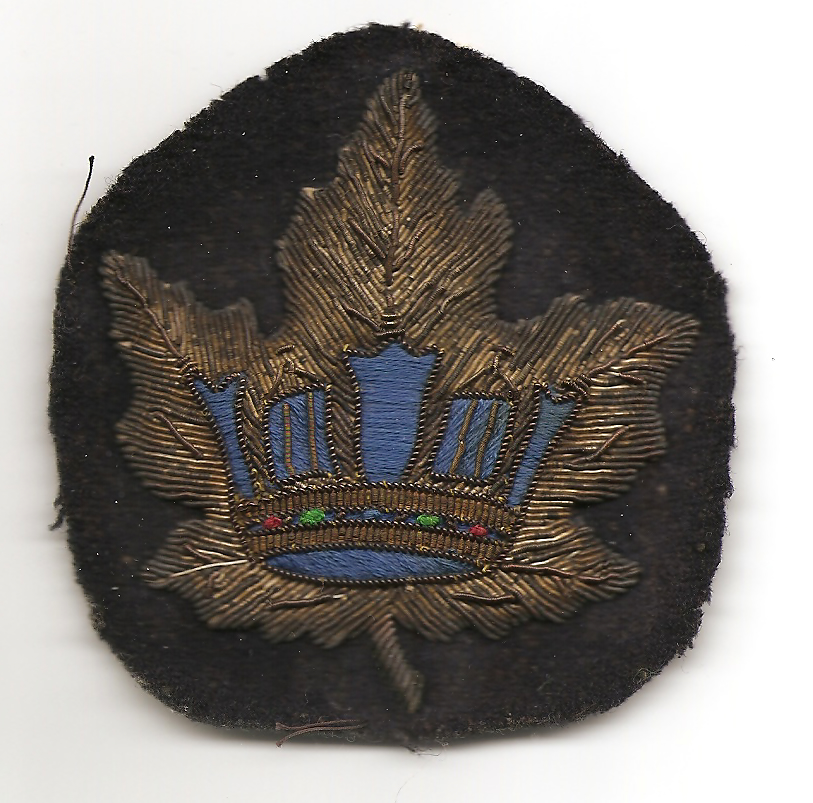
- Badge

General characteristics
- Class & type: Flower-class corvette (original)
- Displacement: 1,015 long tons (1,031 t)
- Length: 208 ft 4 in (63.50 m)o/a
- Beam: 33 ft 1 in (10.08 m)
- Draught: 13 ft 6 in (4.11 m)
- Installed power: 2,750 ihp (2,050 kW); 1 × water-tube boiler
- Propulsion: 1 shaft; 1 × 4-cylinder vertical triple-expansion steam engine
- Speed: 16 knots (30 km/h; 18 mph)
- Range: 3,500 nmi (6,500 km; 4,000 mi) at 12 knots (22 km/h; 14 mph)
- Complement: 85 (6 officers)
- Sensors & processing systems: 1 × SW1C or 2C radar; 1 × Type 123A (ASDIC) or Type 127DV sonar
- Armament: 1 × BL 4-inch (102 mm) Mk IX gun; 1 × 2-pounder (pom-pom); 2 × Oerlikon 20 mm (0.8 in) cannon; 4 × Mk II depth charge throwers; 2 × depth charge rails with 40 depth charges
- Notes: 1940–1941 Revised Program

HMCS Fredericton was a Flower-class corvette of the Royal Canadian Navy. She was ordered from Marine Industries Ltd. in Sorel, Quebec and laid down on 22 March 1941. She was launched on 2 September 1941 and commissioned on 8 December 1941. She was named after the community of Fredericton, New Brunswick.

Fredericton's design was slightly revised from the earlier Flower-class ships. Corvettes built before 1941 behaved poorly in heavy seas, so her length and weight were increased. She was also outfitted with a water-tube boiler which was more powerful and stable than earlier models. Her armament was limited to a 4-inch (100 mm) gun forward and a 2-pound (0.9 kg) pom-pom gun aft gun as well as depth charge throwers which suited her escort duties and anti-submarine capabilities. Later on she was outfitted with the improved Hedgehog anti-submarine device. She was manned by a crew of 85 which included six officers. Her unofficial emblem was a badge emblazoned with a flying tiger dropping a depth charge on a U-boat.

Fredericton served during the Battle of the Atlantic from 1941 to 1945. During 1942 she escorted oil tankers from the Caribbean to New York City. From 1943 to 1945 she escorted convoys in the Western Atlantic and then later on across the Atlantic to Northern Ireland. She was decommissioned on 14 July 1945. Some question as to her final disposition lies with a possible error in Lloyd's Register. Either she was sold for scrap in 1946 or ended up as a Panamanian-flagged Japanese whaler which was used until 1979.

== Royal Canadian Navy corvettes ==
At the advent of World War II, the Royal Canadian Navy greatly desired to build naval class warships. However, Canadian ship building yards were not capable of building such vessels and at the time it was impossible to buy such ships from Britain as its capacity was taken up entirely by its own defence needs. It was decided that a modified whale catcher design could be built by Canadian yards which could later be traded with Britain for Tribal-class destroyers. The barter scheme eventually failed, but the Canadian Navy had already ordered the whale catchers. Sixty-four ships were originally ordered and these were built between 1939–1940, becoming the basis of the RCN corvette fleet.

It was initially expected that the corvette fleet would be superseded by a line of larger frigates and destroyers, but the narrowness of Montreal's Lachine Canal prevented larger ships from getting to Atlantic Ocean from Great Lake shipyards. The corvette fleet stayed. Eventually 123 were built, the largest class of ships ever used by the Canadian Navy. The corvettes were dubbed the Flower class after a similar British design. The British gave them names of flowers such as Begonia and Gladiolus. The Canadian Navy decided to name their ships after Canadian towns. While they should have been called the Town class, a line of American destroyers was already using that name so the term "flower" was retained for Canadian corvettes.

== Building Fredericton ==
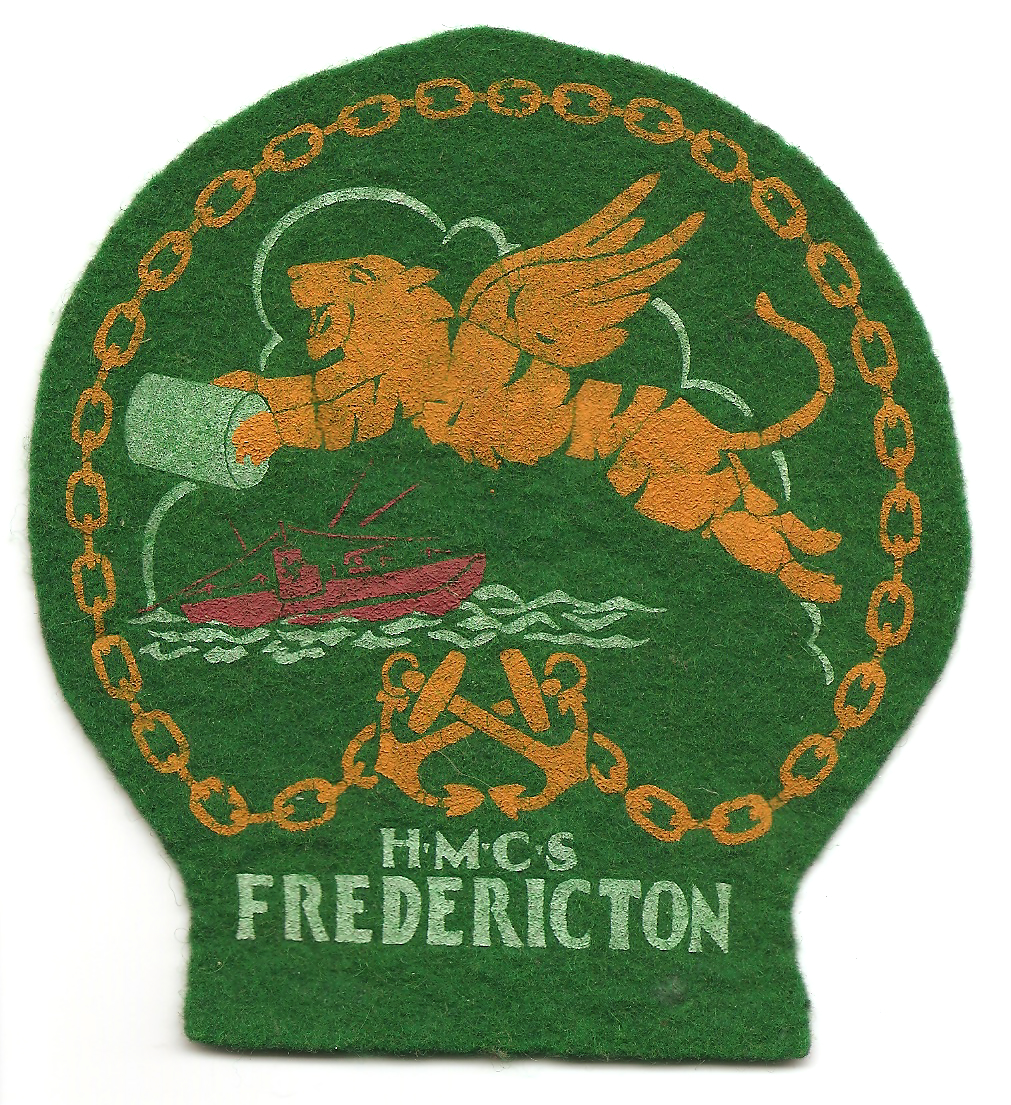
Badge of HMCS Fredericton (K245)

=== Construction ===
Fredericton was laid down by Marine Industries on 22 March 1941 and completed five months and 11 days later on 2 September 1941. The total cost for construction was about $600,000 CAN. She was commissioned for active duty on 8 December 1941.

=== Design ===
Fredericton was part of the Revised Flower class built between 1940 and 1941. There were 10 ships in this class including HMCS Calgary, HMCS Charlottetown and HMCS Halifax. Improvements on the original design included a lengthened forecastle and the foremast was moved behind the main bridge to improve forward vision. The sheer and flare of the bow was increased to improve performance in heavy seas. Earlier Flowers had twin 0.5 inches (12.7 mm) machine guns, which proved ineffective. The revised Flowers were built with single Oerlikon 20 mm (0.8 in) cannon mounted on either side of the bridge.

Fredericton was built with a water-tube boiler. Ships built from 1939–1940 used a Scotch marine boiler. The revised design used a water-tube boiler that had not been available earlier. These boilers subsequently became standard in future ships as they were smaller, safer and easier to maintain than the Scotch marine, and produced a more reliable supply of steam. Fredericton was 208 feet 4 inches (63.50 m) long, which was about 3 feet (0.91 m) longer than earlier designs. This allowed for a longer forecastle that added more living space and dry quarters. She was 33 ft 1 in (10.08 m) wide and she had a draught of 11 ft (3.35 m) forward and 15 ft 7 in (4.75 m) aft. She was driven by a single-screw, triple-expansion reciprocating engine of 2,750 ihp (2,050 kW), which gave her a top speed of 16 knots (30 km/h).

Like most corvettes, Fredericton was installed with a Type 123A ASDIC detection system. This technology was designed in 1934 for armed trawlers and minesweepers of the Royal Navy. The system was outdated but was the best system available to the Canadian Navy at the time. Type 123A could detect the distance to underwater sounds but could not determine the depth.

=== Armament ===
Fredericton was armed with one 4-inch (101.6 mm) gun forward and a 2-pound (0.9 kg) pom-pom gun mounted aft. Two Oerlikon 20 mm (0.8 in) cannon were mounted on the bridge wings for air defence. Depth charges, which were rolled from the stern through two ports or thrown from four launchers aft were used for anti-submarine warfare. Later in the war, she was outfitted with the more effective Hedgehog depth bomb throwers.

=== Crew ===
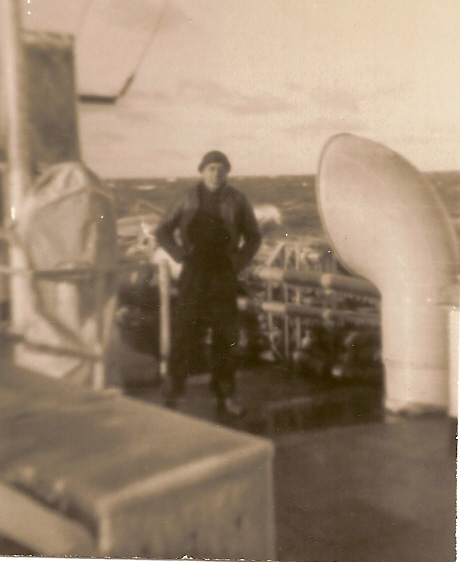
Seaman Fernand Beaupré aboard HMCS Fredericton (1944)

Fredericton was built for a crew of 85 including the commanding officer and five other officers. From 8 December 1941 to 1 July 1942 she was commanded by Acting Lieutenant Commander (LCdr) J.H.S. MacDonald of the RCNR. LCdr J.E. Harrington of the RCNVR commanded her from 2 July 1942 to 20 July 1944 and Lieutenant J.C. Smythe of the RCN commanded her from 21 July 1944 until she was decommissioned on 14 July 1945. MacDonald also served on two other corvettes, HMCS Windflower from February to December 1941 and HMCS Timmins from March to April 1943.

=== Badge ===
Many Canadian naval ships of World War II adopted an unofficial coat of arms, and Fredericton was no exception. Her badge, which was displayed on the front of the bridge, was a flying tiger dropping a depth charge on a U-boat.

== War duty ==
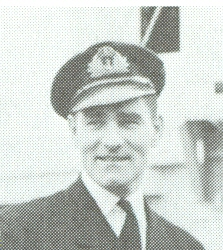
Lt. Cdr. J.E. Harrington who was commander 1942–1944.

Fredericton served during the Battle of the Atlantic from December 1941 to the end of the war in May 1945. After Fredericton was launched she spent a short time undergoing sea trials. From January to July 1942 she escorted convoys between Halifax, St. John's, New York City and Boston.

In 1942 there was an increased U-boat threat in the Caribbean against oil shipments. After Halifax and the UK started experiencing oil shortages, tanker convoys were organized between Caribbean ports and Halifax and New York City. In July, Fredericton was assigned to escort convoy HA002/AH002 from Halifax to Aruba and back. Since the U.S. Navy had insufficient ships for these convoys, Fredericton along with six other Canadian corvettes was temporarily transferred to American naval operational command for convoy escort between Guantánamo Bay and New York City. She participated in these oil convoy escorts from September until February 1943.

After the Caribbean duty she was transferred to Western Local Escort Force for duty between New York City and St. John's, Newfoundland. Fredericton came close to seeing action when she was assigned to convoy HX229 on 8 March 1943, but she turned back at St. John's on 14 March. Two days later the convoy was attacked by a wolfpack of nearly 40 U-boats, which resulted in the sinking of 22 ships.

After a major refit she was reassigned to the Mid-Ocean Escort Force in October 1943 escorting convoys between St. John's and Derry, Northern Ireland. Fredericton spent 11 months in this capacity before undergoing a second refit in September 1944. For the remainder of the war, she served as an ocean escort.

During her time in the Battle of the Atlantic she was never fired upon nor had cause to use her own weapons in anger. This earned her the reputation as the "luckiest ship in the Royal Canadian Navy".

== Convoy record summary ==
Description	Time Period	Convoys Escorted (Note: Convoys are listed in chronological order.)	Ports visited
Local escort force	Jan. 1942 – July 1942	HX171, SC069, HX181, ON079, SC081, ON089, HX192, ON098, HX195, ON104, BX028	Boston, New York City, Halifax, St. John's
Caribbean escort duty	July 1942 – Aug. 1942	HA002, AH002	Halifax, Aruba
Transferred to USN Command	Sep. 1942 – Feb. 1943		Guantánamo Bay, New York City
Western Local Escort Force	Mar. 1943 – May 1943	HX229, HX230, ONS001, SC127, ONS004, XB049A, BX049	New York City, Halifax, St. John's
First refit	May 1943 – Oct. 1943		Liverpool, Nova Scotia
Mid Ocean Escort Force	Oct. 1943 – Sep. 1944	HX262, ON213, HX270, ON219, HX276, ON224, SC154, ONS032, ON234, HX291, ON239, HX296, ON244, HX301, ON249, HX306, ON256	Halifax, St. John's, Londonderry
Second refit	Sep. 1944 – Feb. 1945		Saint John, New Brunswick
Mid Ocean Escort Force	Feb. 1945 – May 1945	SC168, ON292, SC172, ON300, SC176	Halifax, St. John's, Londonderry

== Disputed disposition ==
Several sources (Lenton, Lynch, Macpherson) show that in July 1945 Fredericton was transferred to Sydney, Nova Scotia to be decommissioned for disposal and scrapping. Other sources (uboat.net, Royal Canadian Navy) claim that a mistake in Lloyd's Register switched its records with HMCS Saskatoon (K158). The alternative information shows that Fredericton was sold in 1948. She was registered under the Panamanian flag as Tra los Montes, and in 1950 she was renamed as Olympic Fighter for use as a whaler. Subsequent names included Otori Maru No. 6 in 1956 and Kyo Maru No. 20 in 1961. The last notation in Lloyd's Register was for 1978–79.
