= HMCS Timmins =

Flower-class corvette

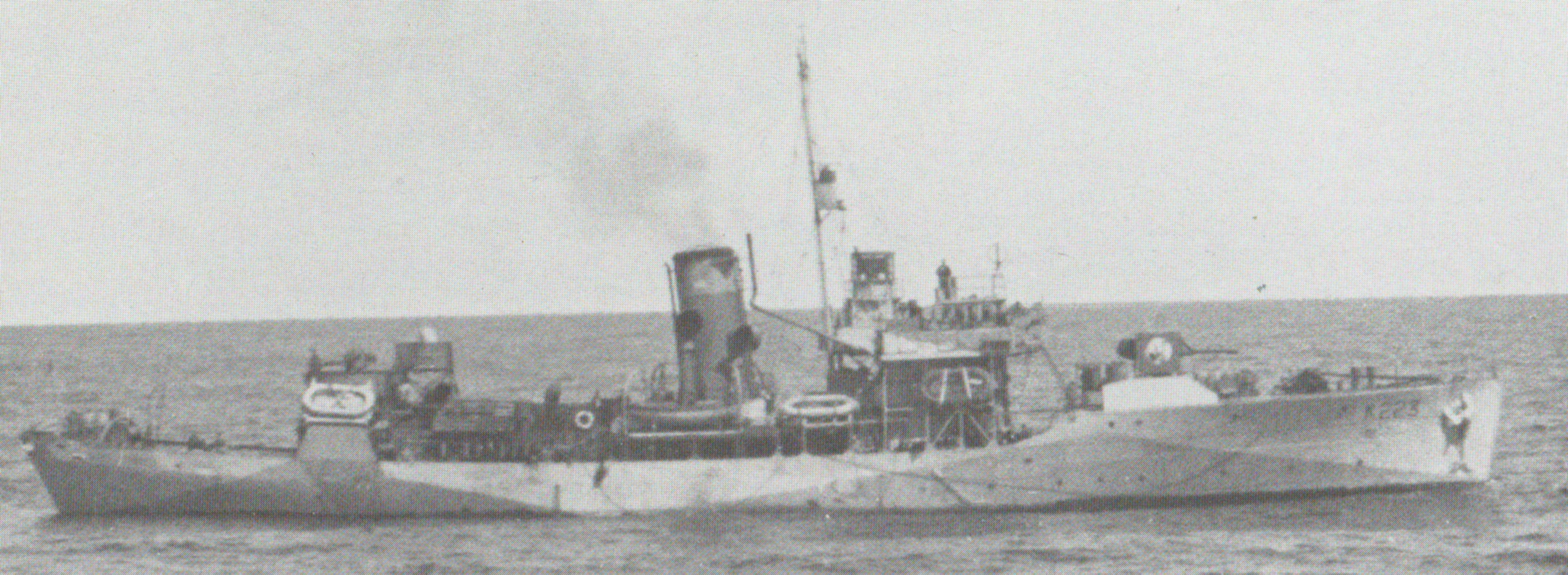
- HMCS Timmins about 1943

History

Canada
- Name: Timmins
- Namesake: Timmins, Ontario
- Builder: Yarrows Ltd., Esquimalt
- Cost: $600,000 CAN
- Laid down: 14 December 1940
- Launched: 26 June 1941
- Commissioned: 10 February 1942
- Decommissioned: 15 July 1945
- Identification: Pennant number: K223
- Honours and awards: Atlantic 1942–45
- Fate: Sold in 1948 as mercantile ship named Guayaquil. Lost on 3 August 1960

General characteristics
- Class & type: Flower-class corvette (original)
- Displacement: 950 long tons (970 t; 1,060 short tons)
- Length: 205 ft 1 in (62.51 m)o/a
- Beam: 33 ft 1 in (10.08 m)
- Draught: 13 ft 5 in (4.09 m)
- Propulsion: single shaft; 2 × Scotch marine boilers; 1 × 4-cycle triple-expansion reciprocating steam engine; 2,750 ihp (2,050 kW)
- Speed: 16 kn (30 km/h)
- Range: 3,450 nautical miles at 12 knots (6,390 km at 22 km/h)
- Complement: 85 (6 officers)
- Sensors & processing systems: 1 × SW1C or 2C radar; 1 × Type 123A (ASDIC) or Type 127DV sonar
- Armament: 1 × BL 4 in (102 mm) Mk.IX single gun; 1 × 2-pounder (pom-pom); 2 × 0.5 (50 cal) machine guns; 4 × Mk.II depth charge throwers; 2 × depth charge rails with 40 depth charges
- Notes: 1940–1941 Short Forecastle Program

HMCS Timmins was a Flower-class corvette of the Royal Canadian Navy that served during the battle of the Atlantic from 1942 to 1945. She was ordered from Yarrows Ltd. in Esquimalt, British Columbia and laid down on 14 December 1940. She was launched on 26 June 1941 and commissioned on 10 February 1942. She was named after the community of Timmins, Ontario.

She was lightly armed with a 4-inch gun and a 2-pounder naval gun. She used depth charges for anti-submarine warfare. She was crewed by a complement of 85 sailors and 6 officers. Her unofficial badge was a smug cat clutching a U-boat in its paw.

For the first six months she performed coastal defense duties on the west coast. In October 1942 she was ordered to the east coast travelling via the Panama Canal. From November 1942 to July 1945 she escorted convoys with the Western Local Escort Force which operated from New York City to St. John's, Newfoundland. In November 1942, Timmins was assigned to escort convoy ON145. On 21 November the convoy was attacked by U-518. The U-boat torpedoed and sank the British merchant Empire Sailor. Timmins along with HMCS Minas rescued 42 survivors from the ship. She was decommissioned on 15 July 1945. In 1948 she was sold off and turned into a mercantile freighter called Guayaquil. She was reported lost on 3 August 1960.

== Description ==
Timmins was laid down by Yarrows Ltd. on 14 December 1940 and completed 6 months and 12 days later on 26 June 1941. Total cost for construction was about $600,000 CAN. She was commissioned for active duty on 11 September 1941.

=== Design ===
Timmins was part of a second order of corvettes commissioned by the Royal Canadian Navy. After the crisis of 1940 six additional ships were ordered. She was identical to the original corvettes except that she had no minesweeping gear and her bridge wings were extended. She had an overall length of 205 ft 1 in (62.51 m) and was 33 ft 1 in (10.08 m) at her widest point. She had a draught of 13 ft 5 in (4.09 m) and weighed 950 long tons (970 t; 1,060 short tons).

She was powered by a pair of Scotch marine boilers and was driven by a single screw, triple expansion reciprocating engine of 2,750 ihp (2,050 kW) which gave her a top speed of 16 knots (30 km/h). She had a capacity of 230 tons of fuel which gave her a maximum range of 3,450 nautical miles (6,390 km) cruising at a speed of 12 knots (22 km/h).

Like most corvettes, Timmins was installed with a Type 123A ASDIC detection system. This technology was designed in 1934 for armed trawlers and minesweepers of the Royal Navy. The system was outdated but was the best system available to the Canadian Navy at the time. Type 123A could detect the distance to underwater sounds but could not determine the depth.

=== Armament ===
Timmins was armed with one 4-inch (102 mm) gun forward and a 2-pounder pom-pom gun mounted aft. Twin 0.5 in (12.7 mm) Vickers machine guns were mounted in the aft gun tub for air defence. Depth charges were used for anti-submarine warfare which were rolled from the stern through two ports or thrown from four launchers near the stern.

=== Crew ===
Timmins was built for a crew of 85 including 6 officers and the commanding officer. She was commanded by eight different officers, one of whom was J.H.S. MacDonald who also commanded HMCS Windflower and HMCS Fredericton.

=== Badge ===
Many Canadian naval ships of World War II adopted an unofficial coat of arms. The badge that Timmins chose was displayed on the front of the bridge and was a stylized smug cat clutching a U-boat in its paw.

== Service ==
Timmins was launched in February 1942 and was initially assigned to the Pacific Coast Command based in Esquimalt, BC. In October 1942 she along with five other corvettes were transferred to the east coast travelling via the Panama Canal. Seaman Robert MacDonald who was travelling with the group on HMCS Dundas reported that wireless transmission picked up significantly which was a far cry from the relative quiet on the west coast and it took a while to become accustomed to the increased chatter.

After arriving on the East Coast in November 1942, Timmins was assigned to the Western Local Escort Force (WLEF) where she escorted convoys between New York City and Halifax, Nova Scotia as far as St. John's, Newfoundland. On 21 November 1942 while escorting Convoy ON 145 off the south coast of Newfoundland, the convoy was attacked by German submarine U-518. The U-boat torpedoed and sunk the British merchant Empire Sailor. Timmins along with HMCS Minas rescued 42 survivors from the ship.

In July 1944 she underwent a four-month refit where her forecastle was extended. After the refit she continued operations with WLEF until the end of the war. She was decommissioned in July 1945 and anchored at Sorel, Quebec for disposal.

In 1948 she was sold as a mercantile carrier and renamed Guayaquil. She was registered under a Honduran flag of convenience. She served in this capacity until 3 August 1960 when she foundered and sank off the coast of Ecuador.

=== Convoy record summary ===
Description	Time Period	Convoys Escorted (Note: Convoys are listed in chronological order.)	Ports visited
Pacific Coast Command	Feb. 1942 – Sep. 1942		Esquimalt, BC
Transit from West to East Coast	Oct. 1942		Esquimalt, BC, Halifax, NS
Western Local Escort Force	Nov. 1942 – June 1944	ON139, HX214, ON144, SC109, ON145, HX218, ON153, SC113, ON161, HX222, ON162, HX223, ON168, HX227, SC120, ON172, ON176, HX232, ON177, ON181, HX237, HX241, HX242, ON187, SC143, ONS20, SC144, XB80 ONS22, ONS24, SC146, XB84, ONS26, SC148, SC150, XB88, ON220, XB92, HX278, ON223, ON225, HX283, ON228, HX286, ON232, SC157, HX292, ON236, HX294, ON240	New York City, Halifax, St. John's
First refit	July 1944 – Sept. 1944		Liverpool, Nova Scotia
Western Local Escort Force	Oct. 1944 – May 1945	HX316, ONS36, HX326, ON272, HX330, ONS40, BX144, HX338, ON284, HX342, HX344, ONS44, XB154, BX154, HX349, HX353, ON295, ON298, ON301	New York City, Halifax, St. John's
