= Haldane Stewart =

English musician, composer and cricketer (1868–1942)

Haldane Campbell Stewart
- Born: 28 February 1868; Notting Hill, London, England
- Origin: English
- Died: 14 June 1942 (aged 74) Headington, Oxfordshire, England
- Occupations: Organist, choirmaster, composer, teacher
- Instrument: Organ

Haldane Stewart
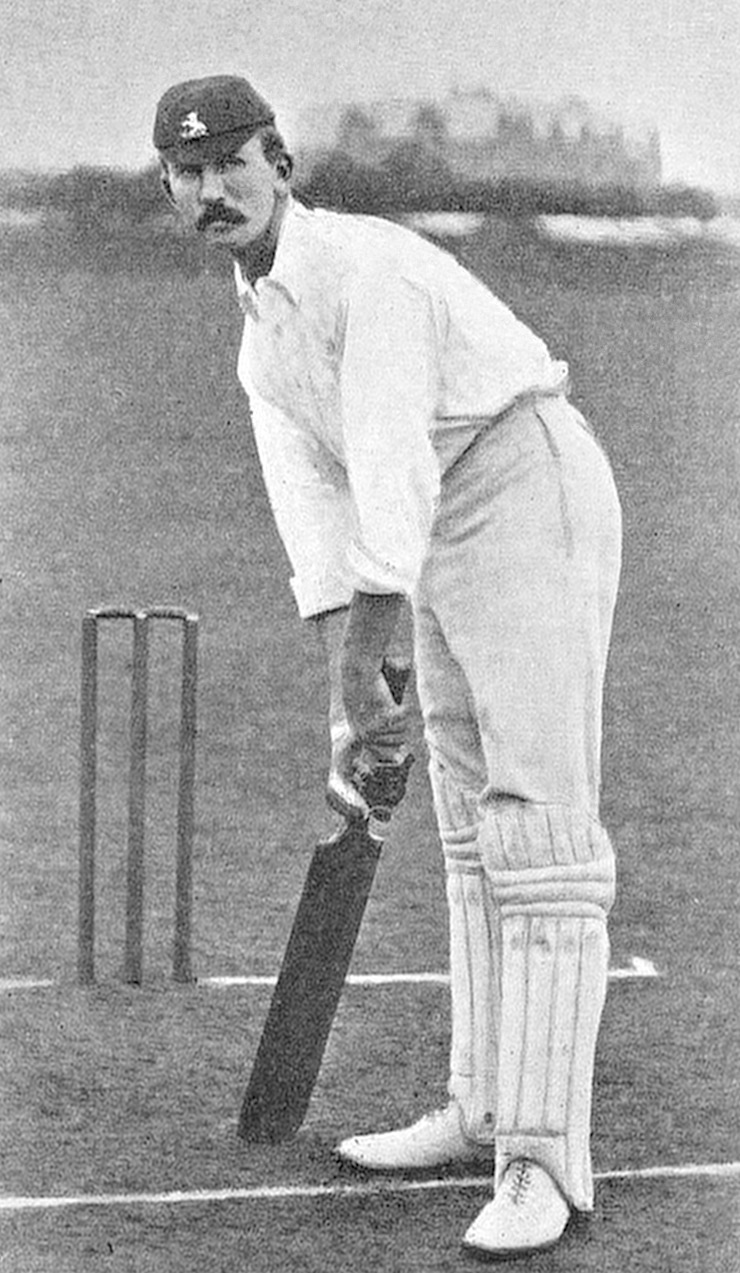
- Stewart in 1896

Personal information
- Full name: Haldane Campbell Stewart
- Batting: Right-handed

Domestic team information
- Years: Team
- 1892–1903: Kent
- 1897: Marylebone Cricket Club

Career statistics
Competition	First-class
Matches	75
Runs scored	2,829
Batting average	22.63
100s/50s	2/16
Top score	142
Balls bowled	117
Wickets	3
Bowling average	32.33
5 wickets in innings	0
10 wickets in match	0
Best bowling	1/2
Catches/stumpings	41/–
- Source: CricInfo, 29 July 2011

Haldane Campbell Stewart (28 February 1868 – 14 June 1942) was an English musician, composer and cricketer. He was organist and choirmaster of Magdalen College, Oxford, and a composer known for his liturgical music. He played first-class cricket as a batsman for the Kent County Cricket Club.

== Life and career ==
Stewart was born in Notting Hill, London, on 28 February 1868. He was the youngest of four sons born to John Stewart and Anne Winslow. Stewart's father, John Stewart, was the sixth Baron Appin, and a barrister of Lincoln's Inn. As a boy in 1879, Stewart sang as a chorister in the chapel of Magdalen College, Oxford, under Walter Parratt. Stewart remained in the choir until 1882. He returned to Magdalen as a classics exhibitioner from 1887 to 1891, and was awarded a Bachelor of Arts degree in 1893.

Stewart played in the cricket XI at Magdalen from 1890 to 1891. He played in 75 first-class cricket matches as a batsman, mainly for Kent County Cricket Club, between 1892 and 1903, scoring 2,829 runs at a batting average of 22.63. He toured the United States with the Kent team under the captaincy of Cuthbert Burnup in 1903, scored 142 at Lord's against MCC in 1897 and made 203 not out for Blackheath against Granville, Lee. He was also known for his fielding ability and took 41 catches in first-class cricket. Stewart also played for the Gentlemen (1897) and MCC (1897) as well as for a number of teams in club cricket including the Gentlemen of Kent (1892), Blackheath (1892–1896), Free Foresters (1919) and I Zingari (1919).

Stewart was appointed to teach at Lancing College, West Sussex in 1891, where he became Director of Music. In 1896, he was appointed to Wellington College, Berkshire. From 1898 to 1919, he held the post of Director of Music at Tonbridge School, Kent. Stewart was awarded a Bachelor of Music in 1915, and in 1919 was awarded a Master of Arts and Doctor of Music. In 1919, he took up the post of organist and informator choristarum (organist and choirmaster) of Magdalen College, Oxford University, and was choragus of the university. During his lifetime, Stewart published liturgical choral music, songs and some instrumental works, and published a collection of tunes for the Music Syllabus of the Oxford and Cambridge Schools Examination Board. Notable among his works are a setting of Psalm 147 ("O Praise to the Lord"), and the carol, On this Day Earth Shall Ring. He provided assistance to John E. West in compiling the 1921 publication Cathedral organists past and present. In 1938, Stewart was succeeded at Magdalen College by William McKie, but returned to this post in 1941 due to McKie's wartime service with the Royal Air Force. He died at Headington, Oxfordshire, on 16 June 1942, at the age of 74, and was succeeded as organist at Magdalen by Philip J. Taylor in 1943.

== Family ==
Stewart was the youngest of four sons born to John Stewart and Anne Winslow. His father John Stewart (1822–1890) was the sixth Baron Appin, and his grandfather was Duncan Stewart, who was the Attorney-General of Bermuda. Stewart's elder brothers were Donald Charles Stewart, (1859–1885), Robert Bruce Stewart, born in 1863, who inherited the title of Baron Appin in 1890, and Alan Winslow Stewart, born in 1865.

Stewart was married to Elinor Dorothy Hunt. While in Tonbridge, their daughter Jean was born in 1914. Three years later in 1917, their son Lorn Alastair was born. As a family, they played as a string quartet, with Stewart playing viola, Elinor playing cello, and with Jean and Lorn playing first and second violin, respectively. Stewart's daughter Jean Stewart (1914–2002) was a noted concert performer on viola, performing as a soloist, and in chamber music and orchestras. She performed with the Menges Quartet, the London Bach Orchestra and the English Baroque Soloists. Stewart's son Lorn Alastair Stewart ("Johnnie Stewart") (1917–2005), became a radio and television producer for the BBC, and went on the create and produce the BBC television music programme, Top of the Pops.

== Works ==
=== Published compositions ===
==== Choral ====
- Psalm 147 O praise to the Lord
- Te Deum Patrem
- Two Hymns. 1. Holy Father, cheer our way. 2. Christ is our Corner-Stone (1905)
- May Christ, our Saviour. Hymn for those at sea (1917) words by C. Lowry
- On Christmas Morn, the Tale is told. [carolette] (1925) Words by R. W. Macan
- On this Day Earth Shall Ring [carol] (1934)
- The Winds at Bethlehem. [carol] (1936) Words by W. M. Letts
- Penned are the Sheep. [carol] (1936) Words by R. K. Davis
- Magnificat and Nunc dimittis in A minor (1940)
- King of Glory. [anthem]
- Veni, Sancte Spiritus. [motet]

==== Songs ====
- The Ancient Shores of England. (1900)
- In Camp. (1901) [Song and chorus.] Words by W. M. Gordon
- The Song Cycle of Aucassin & Nicolete. Words by A. Lang and G. Tomson (1906)
- The Day (1915) Words by J. R. Smart

==== Other publications ====
- A Collection of seventy Tunes chosen for the Music Syllabus of the Oxford and Cambridge Schools Examination Board. (1938)

=== Select discography ===
- On This Day Earth Shall Ring. Lichfield Cathedral Choir. Alpha Collection Vol 10: Advent and Christmas. Priory Records 109. (2007)
- Psalm 147 O praise to the Lord. Evensong for St. Cecilia. Priory Records 749
