= HMCS Minas =

Canadian Navy ship

History

Canada
- Name: Minas
- Namesake: Minas Basin
- Ordered: 23 February 1940
- Builder: Burrard Dry Dock Co. Ltd., North Vancouver
- Laid down: 18 October 1940
- Launched: 22 January 1941
- Commissioned: 2 August 1941
- Decommissioned: 6 October 1945
- Identification: Pennant number: J165
- Recommissioned: 15 March 1955
- Decommissioned: 7 November 1955
- Identification: pennant number: 189
- Honours and awards: Atlantic 1941–44, Normandy 1944
- Fate: Sold for scrap 1958.
- Badge: Argent, a pile barry wavy or and azure, and over all placed horizontally, a billet gules.

General characteristics
- Class & type: Bangor-class minesweeper
- Displacement: 672 long tons (683 t)
- Length: 180 ft (54.9 m) oa
- Beam: 28 ft 6 in (8.7 m)
- Draught: 9 ft 9 in (3.0 m)
- Propulsion: 2 Admiralty 3-drum water tube boilers, 2 shafts, vertical triple-expansion reciprocating engines, 2,400 ihp (1,790 kW)
- Speed: 16.5 knots (31 km/h)
- Complement: 83
- Armament: 1 × QF 4 in (102 mm)/40 cal Mk IV gun; 1 × QF 2-pounder Mark VIII; 2 × QF 20 mm Oerlikon guns; 40 depth charges as escort

HMCS Minas was a Bangor-class minesweeper that served in the Royal Canadian Navy during the Second World War. She saw action in the Battle of the Atlantic and the Invasion of Normandy. She was named for Minas Basin. After the war she was reactivated for a short period of time in 1955 before being sold for scrap.

== Design and description ==
A British design, the Bangor-class minesweepers were smaller than the preceding Halcyon-class minesweepers in British service, but larger than the Fundy class in Canadian service. They came in two versions powered by different engines; those with a diesel engines and those with vertical triple-expansion steam engines. Minas was of the latter design and was larger than her diesel-engined cousins. Minas was 180 feet (54.9 m) long overall, had a beam of 28 feet 6 inches (8.7 m) and a draught of 9 feet 9 inches (3.0 m). The minesweeper had a displacement of 672 long tons (683 t). She had a complement of 6 officers and 77 enlisted.

Minas had two vertical triple-expansion steam engines, each driving one shaft, using steam provided by two Admiralty three-drum boilers. The engines produced a total of 2,400 indicated horsepower (1,800 kW) and gave a maximum speed of 16.5 knots (30.6 km/h; 19.0 mph). The minesweeper could carry a maximum of 150 long tons (152 t) of fuel oil.

Minas was armed with a single quick-firing (QF) 4-inch (102 mm)/40 caliber Mk IV gun mounted forward that was later replaced with a 12-pounder (3 in (76 mm)) 12 cwt HA gun. (Note: "Cwt" is the abbreviation for hundredweight, 20 cwt referring to the weight of the gun. The 40 caliber denotes the length of the gun. This means that the length of the gun barrel is 40 times the bore diameter.) For anti-aircraft purposes, the minesweeper was equipped with one QF 2-pounder Mark VIII and two single-mounted QF 20 mm Oerlikon guns. The 2-pounder gun was later replaced with a powered twin 20 mm Oerlikon mount. As a convoy escort, Minas was deployed with 40 depth charges launched from two depth charge throwers and four chutes.

== Construction and career ==
Minas was ordered on 23 February 1940 as part of the 1939–40 building programme. Her keel was laid down on 18 October 1940 by Burrard Dry Dock Co. Ltd. at Vancouver. The ship was launched on 22 January 1941. She was commissioned into the Royal Canadian Navy on 2 August 1941 at Vancouver.

=== Second World War ===
In September 1941, Minas sailed for the East coast, arriving at Halifax on 19 October. The minesweeper was assigned to Sydney Force as a local escort. In January 1942, she transferred to Newfoundland Force, remaining with them until November that year. She joined the Western Local Escort Force (WLEF) as a convoy escort that month and served in an unaffiliated capacity until January 1943. On 21 November 1942, Minas, along with the corvette Timmins, rescued 60 survivors of the merchant ship Empire Sailor which had been torpedoed by U-518. Several survivors later died of the phosgene gas they had inhaled when their ship was hit. In January 1943, WLEF reorganized its escorts into groups. Minas joined 24.18.2 alongside corvettes Buctouche, Edmundston, Kamsack and Timmins. She collided with HMS Liscomb on 3 February, near Halifax; the damage resulted in a month of repairs. She became a part of EG W-7 of WLEF in June. She joined escort group W-4 in December.

On 20 February 1944, Minas left Halifax with three of her sisters, travelling to Great Britain as part of Canada's contribution to the invasion of Normandy. She arrived in March 1944 and was assigned to the 31st Minesweeping Flotilla, an all-Canadian flotilla of minesweepers taking part in the D-Day invasions. During the invasion, Minas and her fellow minesweepers swept and marked channels through the German minefields leading into the invasion beaches. The 31st Minesweeping Flotilla swept channel 3 on 6 June, completing the task unmolested by the Germans. Minas nearly collided with the French cruiser Georges Leygues as the assault fleet entered the swept channels. She returned to Canada, undergoing a refit at Dartmouth, Nova Scotia in September 1944, rejoining the 31st Flotilla at Plymouth in January 1945. In April 1945, the 31st Minesweeping Flotilla joined the last large-scale combined operation in the European theatre in an attack on German naval bases in France that had been left untouched by Allied war effort to that point. Departing Plymouth on 12 April, the 31st Minesweeping Flotilla began operations in the mouth of the Gironde estuary on 14 April. They completed their duties on 16 April, unmolested by the Germans. While returning to Plymouth, the flotilla encountered a German trawler and captured it. Later that year in September Minas returned to Canada and was paid off into reserve at Shelburne on 6 October 1945.

=== Postwar service ===
After the war the decommissioned Minas was moved to Sorel. In 1952, she was reacquired by the Canadian Navy and recommissioned on 15 March 1955, to be used as a training vessel. On 15 April 1955, Minas, Wallaceburg and Portage were assigned to the Eleventh Canadian Escort Squadron based out of Halifax. Minas sailed for the West Coast on 30 September. After arrival, her crew transferred to Sault Ste. Marie and returned to Halifax. The minesweeper was paid off on 7 November 1955 and sold in August 1958. Minas was broken up at Seattle beginning on 20 August 1959. The ship's wheel remains on display at Royal Canadian Legion Branch 53 in Baddeck, Nova Scotia.
