= Hakurei Seamount =

Seamount off Adélie Land, Antarctica

Hakurei Seamount (62°52′S 140°49′E) is a seamount located off Adélie Land, Antarctica. The name, approved by the Advisory Committee for Undersea Features in July 1999, is for the RV Hakurei-maru which conducted a detailed survey of the area.
