= Dallmann Seamount =

Seamount named for polar explorer Eduard Dallmann

Dallmann Seamount (67°10′S 96°53′W) is a seamount named for polar explorer Eduard Dallmann, who surveyed the area west of Graham Land up to 66°S. The name was proposed by Dr. Rick Hagen of the Alfred Wegener Institute for Polar and Marine Research, Bremerhaven, Germany, and was approved by the Advisory Committee for Undersea Features in June 1997. Minimal depth is 2100m.
