= Mary Ibberson =

British musician

- Born: Ellen Mary Ibberson; 13 December 1892; Hunstanton, Norfolk
- Died: 6 May 1979 (aged 86); West Bay, Dorset
- Occupations: Musician, teacher, school founder
- Employer: Rural Music Schools Association
- Known for: Founding the first Rural Music School; being Founder-Director of the Rural Music Schools Association

Ellen Mary Ibberson (13 December 1892 – 6 May 1979) was a British musician and teacher, who founded the first Rural Music School. She was the Founder-Director of the Rural Music Schools Association, which she led for 33 years.

== Life ==
Ellen Mary Ibberson was born on 13 December 1892 in Hunstanton, Norfolk.

Ibberson took courses in German and piano in Dresden in 1911. She returned to England in 1913 to the new Garden City at Letchworth in Hertfordshire. Ibberson took part in activities including folk dancing and the Girl Guides, as well as becoming involved in campaigns for women's suffrage.

Ibberson worked at the Settlement in Letchworth Garden City, an adult education organization which was founded in 1920, initially as a tutor. Ibberson was the sub-warden, and ran a music appreciation course there before founding her Rural Music School.

== Rural Music Schools ==
In 1929, Ibberson founded the first Rural Music School in Hitchin, Hertfordshire. According to Ibberson, the idea grew from the activities of the Educational Settlements Association for promoting adult education, "filling leisure with pursuits of the mind," as well as directly from the request of two young men wanting to play the violin.

Ibberson's original school sought to make music teaching available to adults, who had not had access to it in their youth. Ibberson emphasised that the goal of the rural music schools was not concerts and performance, but to learn music, and to bring together musicians, professional and amateur, to learn from one another. It was not, she said, "what we shall do with music so much as what we shall be as a result of it that really matters". Also in 1929, Ibberson founded the Hitchin Symphony Orchestra (originally the Hitchin Concert Orchestra), run for many years as an evening class at North Hertfordshire College, before becoming the Hitchin Symphony Orchestra in 1997.

Ibberson's stated aim was "to make good teaching available to amateurs of all ages, not in the large centres of professional music but in country towns and villages". The 1930 prospectus for the Rural Music School established its "primary concern" as being:

to promote musical endeavour in its social forms. Students are encouraged to become useful members of choirs, orchestras, quartets and music-clubs. A desire to learn and willingness to work are the only qualifications needed for membership.

By 1935, the Federation of Rural Music Schools had been formed, with Ibberson as the organizing secretary. In 1929 there had been one school, two teachers, four classes, and 40 students; in 1937, there were 4 schools and 1,700 students; by 1950, there were 9 schools, 200 teachers, 700 classes and 7,000 students.

Margery Spring Rice established the Suffolk Rural Music School, in memory of her son Stephen. Although the school no longer exists, much of its work is continued by Britten Pears Arts. Barbara Stephen also founded two rural music schools, serving on the Hampshire committee of rural music schools, and later becoming vice-chair of the Central Council of Rural Music Schools.

In 1953, the Rural Music Schools Association moved to new premises in Hitchin - a house, garden, and cottage bequeathed by Esther Seebohm, "to be used in perpetuity for the support of music-making". The building contained a memorial to Editha Knocker, a violin teacher and co-founder of an instrument loan programme, who had been a significant supporter of the Rural Music Schools. Ibberson wrote that "she backed it with generosity and enthusiasm. She enlisted the support of eminent musicians of the day, she gave her own time and skill freely in rehearsing and teaching, and she backed appeals for money by personal example".

In 1955, Ibberson was awarded the OBE for services to music.

== Retirement and death ==
On her retirement in 1962, a special concert was held at the Royal College of Music in Ibberson's honour. The concert was conducted by Adrian Boult, with a programme which included a specially composed work by Imogen Holst, and performances by many of Ibberson's former students and colleagues. Ibberson was succeeded by Helen Wright, who worked for the Association since 1941, first as secretary and later as assistant director.

In 1977, Ibberson published For Joy That We Are Here: Rural Music Schools 1929-50. In a 1976 interview, Bernard Shore described Ibberson "one of the most wonderful women I’ve ever met because she had vision (though she never thought the organisation would grow as it has), and was always striving for standards in the amateur music world".

Mary Ibberson died in Dorset on 6 May 1979.
