= Georges Lecointe (explorer) =

Belgian naval officer and scientist

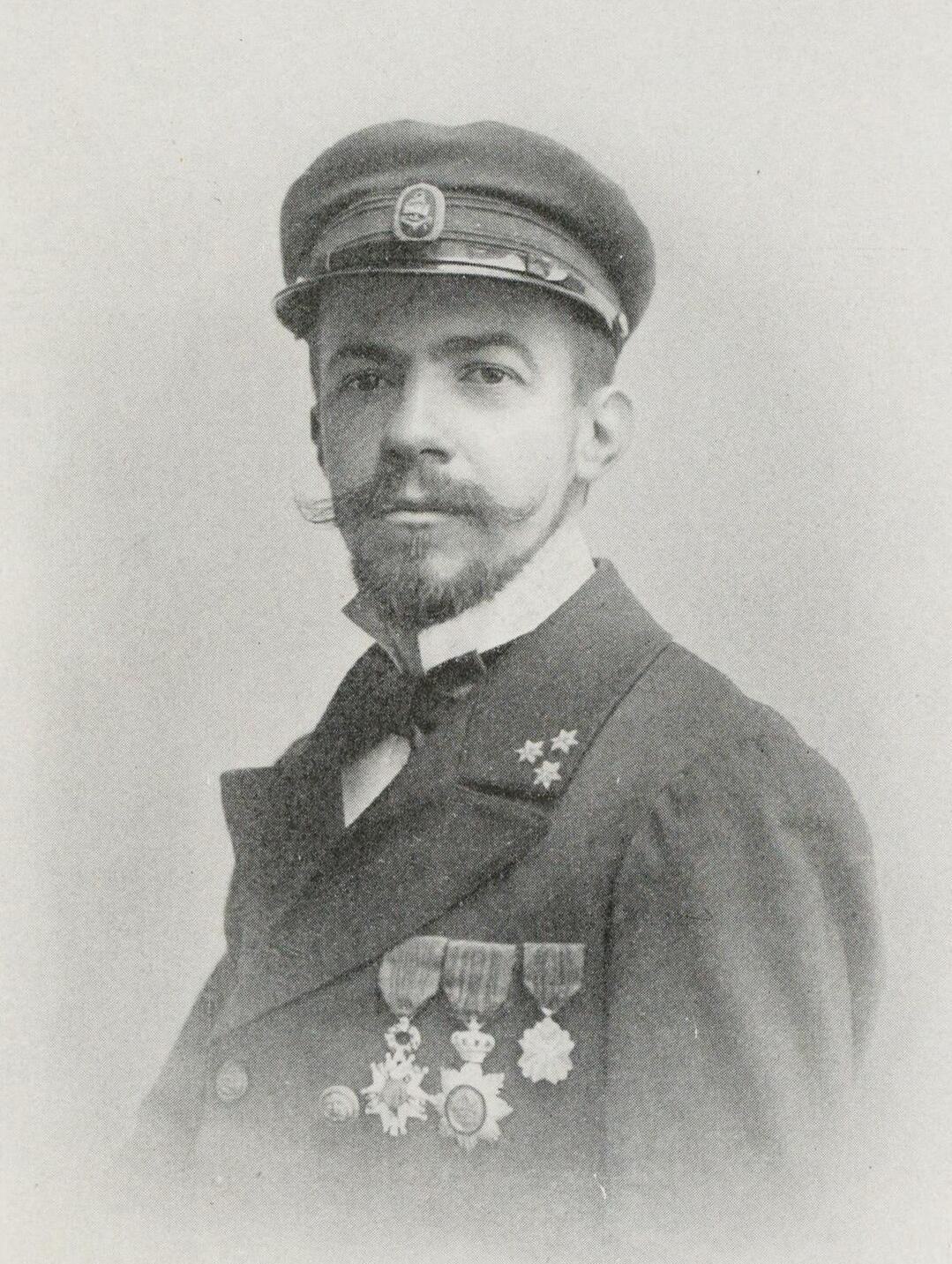
- Born: April 29, 1869; Antwerp, Belgium
- Died: May 27, 1929 (aged 60); Uccle, Belgium
- Occupations: Naval officer and scientist
- Known for: Second-in-command of the Belgian Antarctic Expedition
- Spouse: Charlotte Dumeiz (1900–1929)
- Children: Henri Lecointe; Charlotte Lecointe; Louis-Georges Lecointe

Georges Lecointe (29 April 1869 – 27 May 1929) was a Belgian naval officer and scientist. He was captain of the Belgica and second-in-command of the Belgian Antarctic Expedition, the first to overwinter in Antarctica. After his return to Belgium he was the founder of the International Polar Organization and deeply involved in the foundation of the International Research Council and the International Astronomical Union.

== Early life and career ==
Georges Lecointe was born in Antwerp on 29 April 1869. His father was a well-known mathematics teacher and he proved early on to be a gifted student. He entered the Royal Military Academy in 1886 and the Military Cartographic Institute. After being appointed in 1891 as second lieutenant in the First field artillery regiment and spending some time in the cavalry school in Ypres, he passed the officer examination of the École Polytechnique for the French Navy. The Belgian government detached him to the French Navy, where he was ultimately promoted to ship-of-the-line lieutenant in 1897, or captain-commandant in Belgian army. This three-year detachment was exceptional and happened as a result of an audience with king Leopold II: it was only granted to one other Belgian officer, but refused to his friend Emile Danco.

Between 1894 and 1897 he trained on a number of ships in the Mediterranean, the Atlantic, Cochinchina and Tonkin. In 1897 he was attached to the French Observatory of the Bureau des Longitudes and published a course on astronomical navigation and dead reckoning, La navigation astronomique et la navigation estimée, aimed at navy students of the École Polytechnique. For this achievement, he received the Légion d’Honneur in France which the Belgian King Leopold II allowed him to use in Belgium. In his second book, La création d'une marine nationale Belge (On the Creation of a Belgian National Navy), he pleaded for the re-creation of the Belgian Navy, which had been abolished in 1862. This, however, did not happen until the end of the World War I.

== Belgian Antarctic Expedition ==
It is remembered that the Belgica's company was diverse, and it was the business of the second in command to keep all these men working together.

Lecointe acquitted himself admirably; amiable and firm, he secured the respect of all. As a navigator and astronomer he was unsurpassable, and when he afterwards took over the magnetic work he rendered great services in this department also. Lecointe will always be remembered as one of the main supports of this expedition.

— Roald Amundsen, The South Pole

Emile Danco, a mutual friend of Lecointe and expedition commander Adrien de Gerlache, proposed him in October 1896 to join the Belgian Antarctic Expedition. De Gerlache chose Georges Lecointe not so much for his nautical experience as for his scientific background. Lecointe had, in fact, been detached to the Montsouris observatory, and it was because of his knowledge of astronomy and hydrography that he was taken on. He had also won his "nautical" spurs on the voyages he had made, including a number to the Far East in the French navy [17].De Gerlache offered him the position once more in 1897 as second-in-command of the expedition. Lecointe accepted after due request by the Belgian prime minister and the war minister. He was also responsible for the astronomical and hydrographical observations and, after Danco's death in 1898, measurements of the earth's magnetism.

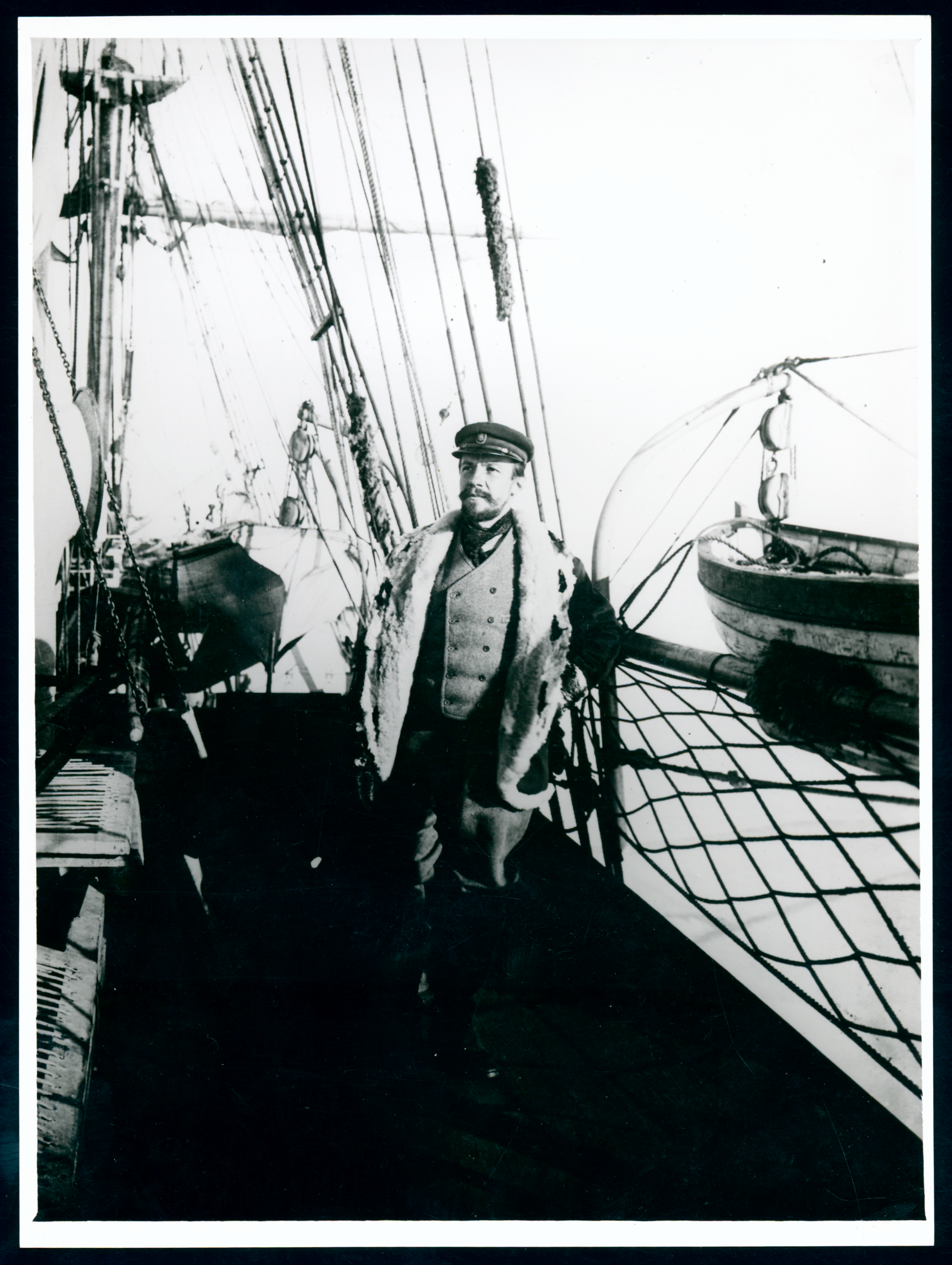
Lecointe aboard the Belgica

Georges Lecointe taking magnetic observations on the sea ice

The expedition set sail from Antwerp in August 1897 and started observations in the Antarctic region later that year. On 22 January 1898 sailor Carl Wiencke was washed overboard and drowned, despite a heroic rescue effort by Lecointe. They made their way to the Bellingshausen sea in early 1898, where the Belgica became trapped in pack ice, forcing them to overwinter for some 13 months. All the expeditioners suffered heavily from scurvy, including Lecointe, but only for a few days in mid-July 1898. Despite de Gerlache's misgivings, they cajoled the sick expedition members into eating fresh seal and penguin meat, nursing them back to health. At the end of July 1898, Lecointe, together with Frederick Cook and Roald Amundsen, went on a one-week sledge excursion southward in order to test new tent design, equipment and to assess the feasibility of an escape through the pack ice escape. Lecointe, jointly with Cook and Amundsen, drafted a detailed plan to reach the South Magnetic Pole in 1899–1900; this was discussed on board during the period of August to November 1898. On another occasion, Lecointe, not knowing the presence of Frederick Cook on the ice during the night, had taken him for a seal, and nearly shot him.

Early in 1899 the crew finally managed to free the Belgica. On reaching South America Lecointe started exploring the Andes while de Gerlache sailed the Belgica back to Belgium. After his return, Lecointe published Au Pays des Manchots (In the Land of the Penguins ), chronicling the Belgica expedition (refer to item in selected works)..

== Scientific career and later life ==
Lecointe was engaged to Charlotte Dumeiz (1873–1940) before the departure of the Belgica. Charlotte Bay was named after her, and they married shortly after his return. The couple had three children: Henri, Charlotte and Louis-Georges. Both sons studied at the Free University of Brussels.

On his return, Lecointe was called to the Boxer war in China as a second in command in the navy. He was appointed in 1900 as scientific director, then in 1914 as Director of the Royal Observatory in Uccle. Together with Henryk Arctowski, Emile Racovitza and Antoni Bolesław Dobrowolski he organized the scientific results of the Belgian Antarctic Expedition, as secretary of the commission charged with the publication of the results. In addition, he oversaw a large-scale renovation of the Royal Observatory. He founded the Belgian Maritime and Vessels Association. Lecointe created the International Association for polar research, a forerunner of the Antarctic Treaty [16] and was the secretary of the International Polar Commission and Congresses in 1906, 1908 & 1913. In 1907, he accepted to become the leader of the second Belgian Antarctic Expedition, a project initiated by Henryk Arctowski. Such an expedition never eventuated due to the lack of funds.

He served voluntarily during the First World War as an artillery major and was involved in the defense of Antwerp, but spent most of the war interned in the Netherlands after the fall of the city. After the war he turned his attention to international cooperation in the sciences, and played an important role in the creation of the International Research Council and affiliated scientific unions, in particular the International Astronomical Union. He served as its vice-president from 1919 to 1922, and lead its Central Bureau for Astronomical Telegrams from 1920 to 1922, while it was temporarily located in Uccle following the First World War. In 1919 he was elected to the executive committee of the International Research Council at its founding congress in Brussels, together with Schuster, Volterra and Hale, with Picard as president. Lecointe was also president of the Royal Belgian Geographical Society (vice-president 1900–1912, new presidency in 1912), the very society that actively sponsored the Belgica expedition.

An illness forced him to resign from the Royal Observatory in 1925 and eventually caused his death in Uccle, on 27 May 1929.

== Awards and honors ==
Academic titles:

- Corresponding Member of the French Institute (1918)
- Corresponding Member of the Longitudes Bureau (1914)
- Associate of the Royal Astronomical Society (London)
- Gold Medal of the Belgian Royal Academy
- Honorary Member and Gold Medallist of the Royal Belgian Geographical Societies of Brussels and Antwerp
- Corresponding Member of the Geographical Society of Geneva
- Honorary Corresponding Member of the Marseille Society of Geography and Colonial Studies
- Honorary Corresponding Member of the Royal Scottish Geographical Society
- Medal awarded by the National Society of Natural Sciences and Mathematics of Cherbourg
- Gold Medal awarded by the Academic Society of International History of Paris

Honorary Distinctions:

- Civic Crosses ( 2nd and 1st class)
- Commandeur of the Order of Leopold
- Commandeur of the Order of the Crown
- Victory Medal
- Commemorative Medal of the 14-18 War
- Commandeur of the Légion d’Honneur
- Commandeur of the Order of the Italian Crown
- Honorary Member of the Association of Belgian and Foreign Journalists Association
- Honorary Member of the Central Bureau of Meteorology
- Honorary Member of the Belgian Maritime ‘Ligue’
- Grand Officer of the Order of the Lion and the Sun
- Chevalier of the Royal Order of Cambodia
- Officer of Public Instruction
- Civic Medal of First Class
- Silver Medal of the city of Antwerp
- Gold Medal of the city of Brussels

== Tributes ==
Lecointe Island, Mount Lecointe, Lecointe Guyot, Georges Point and the asteroid 3755 Lecointe were named in his honor. The Belgian Navy named two Algerine-class minesweepers after him: the M901 Georges Lecointe (1950–1959, ex HMS Cadmus) and the F901 Georges Lecointe (1959–1969, ex HMCS Wallaceburg).

== Selected works ==
- La navigation astronomique et la navigation estimée. Paris, Berger-Levrault, 1897
- La création d'une marine nationale belge. Paris, Berger-Levrault, 1897
- Au pays des Manchots - Récit du voyage de la Belgica. Bruxelles, O. Scheppens et Cie, 1904: J. Lebègue & Cie, 1910
- In the series by the Commission de la Belgica, Résultats du Voyage du S.Y. Belgica en 1897-1898-1899 sous le commandement de A. de Gerlache de Gomery: Rapports Scientifiques. Antwerp, Buschmann, 1901–1913, Lecointe published 5 reports:
  - Astronomie: Etude des chronomètres, première partie. Méthodes et conclusions. Antwerp, Buschmann, 1901
  - Astronomie: Etude des chronomètres, deuxième partie. Journaux et calculs. Antwerp, Buschmann, 1901
  - Travaux hydrographiques et instructions nautiques: Cartes. Antwerp, Buschmann, 1903
  - Travaux hydrographiques et instructions nautiques (premier fascicule). Antwerp, Buschmann, 1905
  - Physique du globe: mesures pendulaires. Antwerp, Buschmann, 1907
