= Maud Seamount =

Seamount in the Southern Ocean

Maud Seamount (65°0′S 2°35′E) is a seamount in the Southern Ocean. Its name was approved by the Advisory Committee for Undersea Features in February 1964.
