= Lichtner Seamount =

Seamount in the Southern Ocean

Lichtner Seamount (67°33′S 0°40′W) is a seamount located in the Southern Ocean. The name, for German cartographer Werner Lichtner, was approved by the Advisory Committee for Undersea Features in April 2000.
