= Mariya Markina =

Russian model

- Born: Mariya Markina; 22 January 1988 (age 38); Dnipropetrovsk, Ukraine SSR, Soviet Union (now Dnipro, Ukraine)
- Modeling information
- Height: 1.80 m (5 ft 11 in)
- Hair color: Blonde
- Eye color: Green
- Agency: Women Management Supreme Management Wild Management

Mariya Markina (Ukrainian: Марія Маркіна; born 22 January 1988) is a Ukrainian model. She walked the runways of many notable designers throughout the 2000s craze of doll-faced models like Vlada Roslyakova, Gemma Ward, and Jessica Stam. Markina has appeared on covers of Vogue, Harper's Bazaar, and L'Officiel.

== Early life ==
Markina was born on 22 January 1988 in Dnipropetrovsk, Ukraine SSR, Soviet Union. Mariya was scouted at a young age, her words, "it was a lucky coincidence, it was a right place at the right time."

== Career ==
=== Runway ===
Markina's runway credits include top fashion houses and designers like Alexander McQueen, Calvin Klein, Carlos Miele, Chanel, Chloé, Dior, Dsquared², Dolce & Gabbana, Donna Karan, Elie Saab, Erin Fetherston, Versace, Valentino, John Galliano, Jil Sander, Jill Stuart, Just Cavalli, Kenzo, Givenchy, Salvatore Ferragamo, Lanvin, Louis Vuitton, Valentino, Yves Saint Laurent, Christian Lacroix, Marc Jacobs, Michael Kors, Mulberry, Viktor & Rolf, Zac Posen. Markina closed the Versace and Jil Sander fashion show during the Spring/Summer 2007 season. In the fall/winter 2007 she walked for Dior fall/winter 2007 in this stunning gown after the spring/summer 2008 season Mariya had disappeared. She briefly returned to the catwalk in 2013 for Fashion Week.

=== Ad campaigns ===
Markina has featured in advertising campaigns for Bergford Goodman and Jil Sander.

== Personal life ==
Markina is studying to be an interior designer and is currently living in Ukraine.
