= Barsukov Seamount =

Seamount named in honor of the Russian scientist, Valeri Barsukov

Location
- Location: Southern Ocean

Barsukov Seamount (61°3′S 29°12′W) is a seamount named in honor of the Russian scientist, Valeri Barsukov, former Director of the Vernadsky Institute of Geochemistry. The name proposed by Dr. G.B. Udintsev, of the same institute, and approved by the Advisory Committee for Undersea Features in June 1995.
