= HMS Fly (1804) =

British naval sloop (1804–1805)

History

United Kingdom
- Name: HMS Fly
- Ordered: 27 February 1802
- Builder: George Parsons, Burseldon
- Laid down: May 1803
- Launched: 26 March 1803
- Fate: Wrecked 8 March 1805

General characteristics
- Class & type: Merlin-class ship-sloop
- Tons burthen: 36913/94 (bm)
- Length: Overall:106 ft 0 in (32.3 m); Keel:87 ft 5 3/4 in (26.7 m)
- Beam: 28 ft 2 in (8.6 m)
- Depth of hold: 13 ft 9 in (4.2 m)
- Complement: 121
- Armament: Upper deck: 16 × 32-pounder carronades; QD: 6 × 12-pounder carronades; Fc: 2 × 12-pounder guns

HMS Fly was launched in March 1804. She was wrecked in March 1805.

== Career and loss ==
Commander Robert O'Brien commissioned her. Commander the Honourable Pownoll Bastard Pellew replaced him in May, and sailed Fly to Jamaica.

Fly was escorting a convoy of eight merchantmen when just before midnight on 7 March 1805 she struck a reef. Two of the vessels she was escorting also struck. Morning revealed that the vessels were close to the Florida shore, five miles south of Key Largo. Despite attempts to lighten Fly by cutting her masts and jettisoning her guns and shot, she was taking on water as the waves pounded her, weakening her beams. In the evening of 8 March her crew abandoned her; the other vessels of the convoy took them off. Several wrecking vessels arrived with the intention of salvaging whatever they could. The court martial found that the chart Pellew was using contained a major error. (Note: Grocott gives the date of the wrecking as 2 March, and that of the court martial as 17 April.)

Lloyd's List reported that Fly and her convoy were coming from Honduras, and that the two merchantmen were Concord, Davis, master, and Rattler, Belmont, master. (Note: Concord, Davis, master, was an American ship that Fly had detained. Ratler, Balmond, master, of 287 tons (bm), had been launched in the United States in 1797.)
