= Lecointe Guyot =

Undersea tablemount named for Georges Lecointe, navigator/astronomer aboard the Belgica

Lecointe Guyot (65°6′S 93°0′W) is an undersea tablemount located about 430 km north-northwest of Peter I Island in the Southern Ocean. It is named for Georges Lecointe, navigator/astronomer aboard the Belgica. The name was proposed by Dr. Rick Hagen of the Alfred Wegener Institute for Polar and Marine Research, Bremerhaven, Germany, and was approved by the Advisory Committee for Undersea Features in June 1997. The minimal depth is 280m.

According to Dr. Hagen, the summit of Lecointe Guyot is a gently domed plain, about 200 square kilometres, similar to that of the Belgica Guyot.
