= Anna Barsukova (model) =

Russian model

- Born: January 21, 1988 (age 38); Tomsk, Siberia, Soviet Union
- Modeling information
- Height: 179 cm (5 ft 10 in)
- Hair color: Blonde
- Eye color: Blue
- Agency: Women Management, Milan

Anna Barsukova (Russian: Анна Барсукова; born 21 January 1988) is a Russian entrepreneur and former fashion model.

== Career ==
Barsukova was born in Tomsk. In February 2005 she made her debut on fall runways in London with Nicole Farhi, and then appeared in a Dolce & Gabbana undergarment advertisement in 2006. In July 2006 she appeared in Teen Vogue and in September of the same year participated in shows for Marc Jacobs and Rocco Barocco in New York City. In November 2006 she was photographed by Paul Rowland from Supreme Modeling for a Supreme World article that appeared in V. In February 2007 she appeared in shows for Marc Jacobs and Brian Reyes and was pictured with Vlada Roslyakova for Fashion TV.

During the same year she also appeared in Alexander McQueen's McQ magazine and in June of the same year was photographed by Craig McDean for W. In July 2007 she participated at the Calvin Klein show and then was photographed by Jurgen Teller for Marc Jacobs. In September 2007 she appeared in the Julien Macdonald spring show in London and the Bottega Veneta show in Milan for the same season. She walked for Alexander McQueen in both the Spring/Summer 2007 and Fall/Winter 2007-2008 shows. In November 2007, Thomas Schenk photographed Anna for another Teen Vogue issue and in February 2008 she posed for United Bamboo and Marie Claire magazine. She also worked with such models as Mariya Markina, Johanna Gene Stickland, Oxana Pautova, Alyona Osmanova, and Tatiana Lyadockrina.

After retiring from modeling, Barsukova pursued an education in business and launched two startups. The first, founded in 2012, was a music school that she founded with a friend who was a music teacher. Two years later Barsukova sold her share in that business to her partner in order to pursue a second startup, a health food and consulting company called Organic Religion.
