= HMS Cadmus (J230) =

Algerine-class minesweeper

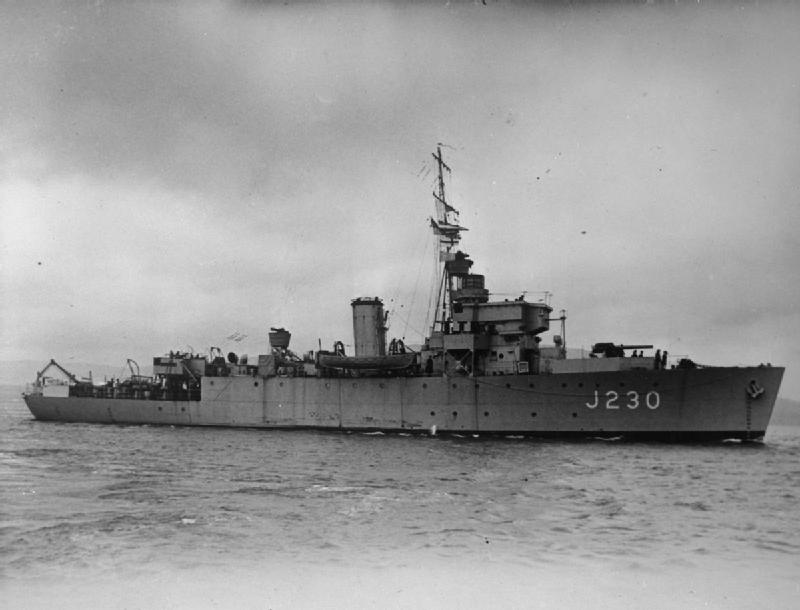
- HMS Cadmus (J230)

History

United Kingdom
- Name: Cadmus
- Namesake: Cadmus
- Ordered: 15 November 1940
- Builder: Harland & Wolff, Belfast
- Laid down: 21 July 1941
- Launched: 27 May 1942
- Commissioned: 9 September 1942
- Decommissioned: July 1946
- Reclassified: M230, 1949
- Identification: Pennant number: J230
- Fate: Sold to the Belgium, 1950

Belgium
- Name: Georges Lecointe
- Namesake: Georges Lecointe
- Acquired: 1950
- Commissioned: 31 January 1950
- Decommissioned: 1959
- Stricken: 24 April 1960
- Identification: Callsign: ORJB; Pennant number: M901
- Fate: Scrapped, April 1960

General characteristics
- Class & type: Algerine-class minesweeper
- Displacement: 850 long tons (864 t) (standard); 1,125 long tons (1,143 t) (deep)
- Length: 225 ft (69 m) o/a
- Beam: 35 ft 6 in (10.82 m)
- Draught: 11 ft 6 in (3.51 m)
- Installed power: 2 × Admiralty 3-drum boilers; 2,000 ihp (1,500 kW)
- Propulsion: 2 shafts; 2 × Parsons geared steam turbines
- Speed: 16.5 knots (30.6 km/h; 19.0 mph)
- Range: 5,000 nmi (9,300 km; 5,800 mi) at 10 knots (19 km/h; 12 mph)
- Complement: 85
- Armament: 1 × QF 4 in (102 mm) Mk V anti-aircraft gun; 4 × twin Oerlikon 20 mm cannon

HMS Cadmus (J230) was a steam turbine-powered Algerine-class minesweeper during the Second World War. Launched in 1942 the ship survived the war and was sold to Belgium in 1950 as Georges Lecointe (M901).

== Design and description ==
The turbine-powered ships displaced 850 long tons (860 t) at standard load and 1,125 long tons (1,143 t) at deep load. The ships measured 225 feet (68.6 m) long overall with a beam of 35 feet 6 inches (10.8 m). The turbine group had a draught of 11 feet (3.4 m). The ships' complement consisted of 85 officers and ratings.

The ships had two Parsons geared steam turbines, each driving one shaft, using steam provided by two Admiralty three-drum boilers. The engines produced a total of 2,000 indicated horsepower (1,500 kW) and gave a maximum speed of 16.5 knots (30.6 km/h; 19.0 mph). They carried a maximum of 660 long tons (671 t) of fuel oil that gave them a range of 5,000 nautical miles (9,300 km; 5,800 mi) at 10 knots (19 km/h; 12 mph).

The Algerine class was armed with a QF 4 in (102 mm) Mk V anti-aircraft gun and four twin-gun mounts for Oerlikon 20 mm cannon. The latter guns were in short supply when the first ships were being completed and they often got a proportion of single mounts. By 1944, single-barrel Bofors 40 mm mounts began replacing the twin 20 mm mounts on a one for one basis. All of the ships were fitted for four throwers and two rails for depth charges.

== Construction and career ==
=== Service in the Royal Navy ===
The ship was ordered on 15 November 1940 at the Harland & Wolff at Belfast, Ireland. She was laid down on 21 July 1941 and launched on 27 May 1942. She was commissioned on 9 September 1942.

=== Service in the Belgian Navy ===
Cadmus was renamed Georges Lecointe (after Belgian polar explorer Georges Lecointe) and was commissioned on 31 January 1950.

In 1959, she was decommissioned by the Navy and on 24 April 1960, she was sold to J. Desmedt Burcht Belgium. Her scrapping process started on 19 May.

== Bibliography ==
- Chesneau, Roger, ed. (1980). Conway's All the World's Fighting Ships 1922–1946. Greenwich, UK: Conway Maritime Press. ISBN 0-85177-146-7.
- Colledge, J. J.; Warlow, Ben (2006) [1969]. Ships of the Royal Navy: The Complete Record of All Fighting Ships of the Royal Navy from the 15th Century to the Present (3rd Rev ed.). London: Chatham Publishing. ISBN 978-1-86176-281-8. OCLC 67375475.
- Elliott, Peter (1977). Allied Escort Ships of World War II: A complete survey. London: Macdonald and Jane's. ISBN 0-356-08401-9.
- Lenton, H. T. (1998). British & Empire Warships of the Second World War. Annapolis, Maryland: Naval Institute Press. ISBN 1-55750-048-7.
