= Eduard Dallmann =

German explorer and whaler (1830-1896)

- Born: March 11, 1830; Blumenthal, Free City of Bremen, German Confederation
- Died: December 23, 1896 (aged 66); Blumenthal, Bremen, German Empire
- Occupations: Whaler, trader, polar explorer
- Known for: First European to set foot on Wrangel Island; Antarctic and Kara Sea exploration; New Guinea mapping
- Notable work: Charting Bismarck Strait, Anvers Island, Kaiser-Wilhelm Island
- Honors: Mount Dallmann, Dallmann Harbour, Dallmann Seamount, Alfred Wegener Institute station

Eduard Dallmann (11 March 1830 – 23 December 1896) was a German-speaking whaler, trader, and Polar explorer, from the Free City of Bremen now in Germany.

Dallmann was born in Blumenthal, at-the-time a village just to the north of Bremen. He began his adventures as a young sailor at the age of 15. In 1866, he became captain of the Hawaii-registered ship W.C. Talbot and undertook trading trips through the Bering and Chukchi Seas to locations in Alaska and Chukotka. He was the first European to set foot on Wrangel Island.

From 1867 to 1870, he commanded the Count Bismarck on a whaling cruise to the Pacific tropics and the Bering and Chukchi seas.

From 1872 to 1874, when whales became more of a rarity in Arctic waters, Dallmann was commissioned to explore the Antarctic seas on the sailing-steamer Grönland. The operation was moderately successful from a whaling point-of-view, but more importantly, Dallmann made many discoveries around Antarctica—among others the Bismarck Strait. Of great value as well was his charting of Anvers, Brabant, Liege, and Kaiser-Wilhelm Islands.

Still on the Grönland, he spent the 1875 whaling season as expert on the Davis Strait and Baffin Bay whaling grounds.

Between 1877 and 1884, on behalf of Russian financier Baron von Knoop, Dallmann made annual attempts to haul freight to the Gulf of Ob and the Yenisei Gulf, to be exchanged for grain and other cargoes brought down the great Siberian rivers by means of barges. Owing to the ice conditions in the Kara Sea, only four out of seven attempts were successful. Finally, von Knoop stopped the difficult venture so as to cut his losses. Despite the few failures, Dallmann had received the rare opportunity to explore many of the Kara Sea-islands and shores seen by few Europeans.

After leaving the Arctic waters forever, Dallmann became the captain of steamer Samoa in 1884. His ship brought the "Otto Finsch Scientific Expedition to the then-little-explored northern coast of New Guinea. Between 1887 and 1893, he continued his exploration of New Guinea's northern coast on behalf of the German New Guinea Company. Numerous islands and straits in the area were named by him.

Dallmann died in Blumenthal on 23 December 1896 at the age of 66.

== Honors ==
- Mount Dallmann of Antarctica's Shcherbakov Range
- The Alfred Wegener Institute has named a research station on King George Island in Dallmann's honor
- In Blumenthal, a street and fountain in the old market have been named after him
- Dallmann Harbour in Papua New Guinea bears his name
- Dallmann Seamount is named in his memory
