= Valeri Barsukov =

Georgian geologist (1928-1992)

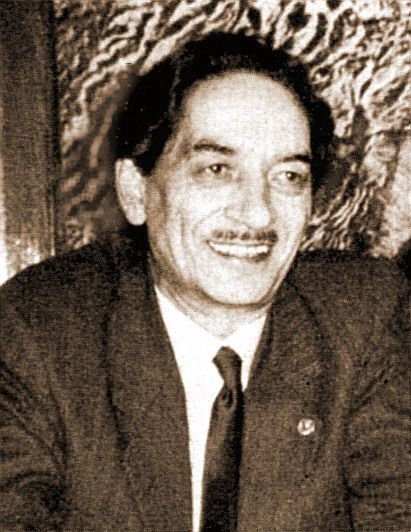
- Barsukov, c. 1986
- Born: 14 March 1928; Moscow, Soviet Union
- Died: 22 July 1992 (aged 64); Moscow, Russia
- Education: Russian State Geological Prospecting University
- Scientific career
- Fields: Geology

Valeri Leonidovich Barsukov (Russian: Валерий Леонидович Барсуков; March 14, 1928 – July 22, 1992) was a Soviet geologist. He worked in comparative planetology and the geochemistry of space. He was director of the V. I. Vernadsky Institute of Geochemistry from 1976 to 1992. In 1987 he received the V. I. Vernadsky Gold Medal for his work. A crater on Mars was named after him.
