= Rudi Linz =

German WWII fighter ace (1917–1945)

Rudolf Linz
- Born: 14 February 1917; Ilmenau, Grand Duchy of Saxony
- Died: 9 February 1945 (aged 27); Meistad, Norway
- Cause of death: Killed in action
- Burial place: German war cemetery Bergen-Solheim; Block 1—Row 17—Grave 10
- Military career
- Allegiance: Nazi Germany
- Branch: Luftwaffe
- Rank: Leutnant (second lieutenant)
- Unit: JG 5
- Conflicts: World War II: Eastern Front; Defence of the Reich; Black Friday †
- Awards: Knight's Cross of the Iron Cross

Rudolf "Rudi" Linz (14 February 1917 – 9 February 1945) was a Luftwaffe (German air force) fighter ace during World War II. He is credited with 70 aerial victories achieved in an unknown number of combat missions, becoming an "ace-in-a-day" on four separate occasions. All but two of his aerial victories were claimed on the Eastern Front. On 9 February 1945, he was shot down and killed in action in defense of the German destroyer Z33 and posthumously awarded the Knight's Cross of the Iron Cross on 12 March.

== Career ==
Linz was born on 14 February 1917 in Ilmenau, at the time in the Grand Duchy of Saxony of the German Empire. On 10 March 1942, he was posted to the 8. Staffel (8th squadron) of Jagdgeschwader 5 (JG 5–5th Fighter Wing), at the time holding the rank of Unteroffizier. The Staffel was headed by Oberleutnant Hermann Segatz while III. Gruppe (3rd group) of JG 5 to which the squadron was subordinated was commanded by Hauptmann Günther Scholz.

=== War on the Arctic Front ===
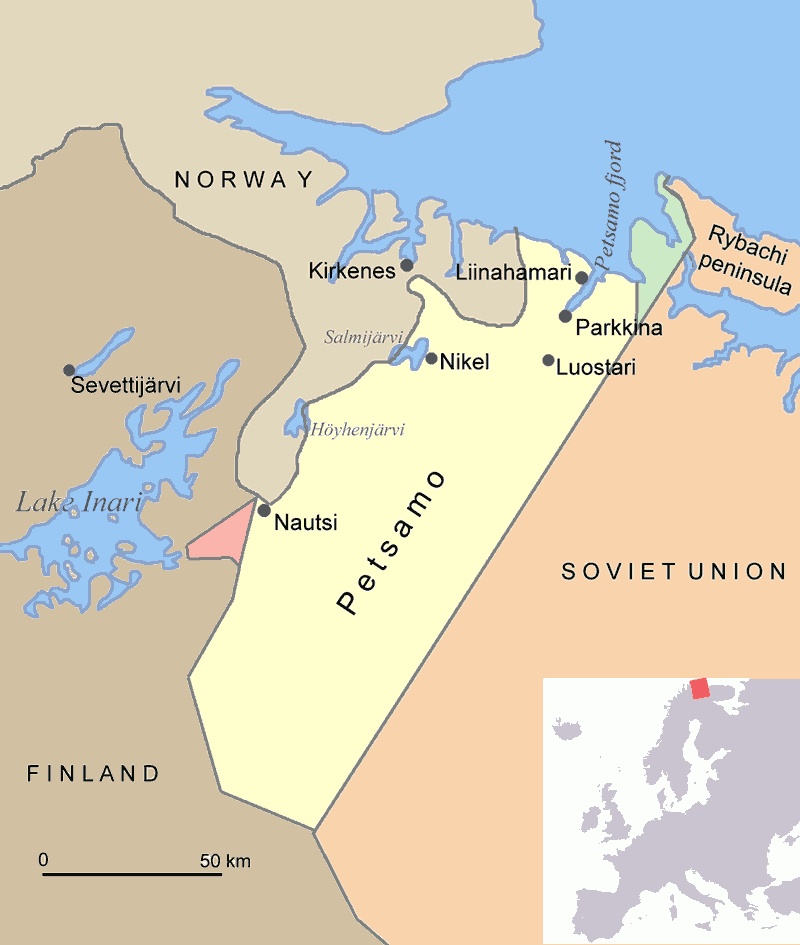
Area of operations.

On 20 April, 8. Staffel moved to an airfield at Petsamo, present-day Pechenga in Murmansk Oblast, Russia. On 25 May, Luftwaffe aerial reconnaissance spotted Convoy PQ 16 heading for Murmansk and Arkhangelsk while Convoy QP 12 left Murmansk. From 25 to 30 May, Luftwaffe units attacked both convoys. In these attacks, Linz claimed his first aerial victory on 30 May. He was presented with the Iron Cross 1st Class (Eisernes Kreuz erster Klasse) by Generaloberst Hans-Jürgen Stumpff on account of his II. and III. Gruppe visit at Pechenga on 19 June.

In 1943, Linz served as a fighter pilot instructor Ergänzungs-Jagdgruppe West, a supplementary training unit based in Cazaux, France. Back from his tour as an instructor, Linz claimed two Lend-Lease Curtiss P-40 Warhawk on a mission to Murmashi and Warlamowo on 23 September 1943. By then, 8. Staffel was led by Oberleutnant Horst Berger and Scholz had been replaced by Hauptmann Heinrich Ehrler as commander of III. Gruppe of JG 5. The following day, 8. Staffel was scrambled at 08:25 and ordered to intercept a Soviet formation. During this encounter, Linz claimed a P-40 and a Lend-Lease Bell P-39 Airacobra fighter aircraft shot down. These were his last claims in 1943. Linz claimed his next aerial victory on 24 February 1944 over a P-39 fighter. However, prevailing Soviet records do not reveal any matching losses. Linz claimed another P-39 fighter shot down on 8 March. The aircraft shot down may have been a misidentified Yakovlev Yak-9 fighter from the 324 IAD (Istrebitel'naya Aviatsionnaya Diviziya—Fighter Aviation Division) which lost two aircraft in that area of operations that day.

On 7 April, III. Gruppe flew many missions, escorting German shipping. On one of these missions, Linz claimed a Yak-9 fighter shot down. On 23 April, Soviet aerial reconnaissance spotted a German convoy heading west. In defense of this convoy, Linz claimed four P-39 fighters shot down. These claims cannot be linked to Soviet records which document the loss of a single P-39 fighter lost to aerial combat. On 10 May, the German airfields at Petsamo, Kirkenes and Salmiyarvi came under attack by Soviet aerial units at 01:00. 8. Staffel was scrambled at Salmiyarvi and intercepted a formation of Soviet Ilyushin Il-2 ground-attack aircraft escorted by P-39 fighters 20 kilometers (12 miles) southwest of Petsamo. During this encounter, Linz claimed three P-39 fighters shot down. The next day, 7. and 8. Staffel were scrambled at 03:00. During the course of the following combat, Linz claimed two aerial victories. On 13 May, Linz claimed another aerial victory. His claim and Soviet records are not aligned, he claimed a P-39 fighterwhile the Soviet records show the loss of an Il-2 ground-attack aircraft. On 16 May, Linz became an "ace-in-a-day" for the first time, claiming three Soviet fighters and two ground-attack aircraft shot down. That day, III. Gruppe flew multiple missions in support of German shipping. On 25 May, Linz again became an "ace-in-a-day" when he shot down five enemy aircraft in defense of a German convoy. Luftwaffe pilots claimed 33 aerial victories while Soviet records document the loss of five aircraft.

On 17 June, III. Gruppe was busy flying convoy escort missions. At 07:30, III. Gruppe took off to its largest aerial battle. That day, the Soviet Air Forces attacked with 227 aircraft. In two separate engagements, German pilots claimed 66 aerial victories. On the morning mission, the Germans claimed 36 Soviet aircraft shot down. That evening, they claimed 30 further aerial victories. These 66 claims are offset by twelve documented Soviet losses. On these two missions, Linz claimed nine aerial victories. As part of the group expansion from three Staffeln per Gruppe to four Staffeln per Gruppe, Linz's 8. Staffel was re-designated and became the 11. Staffel of JG 5 on 15 August 1944. On 17 August, eight P-40 fighter aircraft of the 6 IAD, accompanied by fourteen P-39 fighter aircraft, attacked the Luostari/Pechenga airfield. In parallel, further Soviet aircraft, including a number of Boston bombers, attacked the harbor at Kirkenes. First elements of III. Gruppe were scrambled at 09:25, resulting in various aerial encounters. In this combat, Linz claimed three victories. Linz claimed his last aerial victory with 11. Staffel on 3 September, a Petlyakov Pe-2 bomber shot down near Murmansk. Linz was then transferred to the Verbandsführerschule of the General der Jagdflieger (Training School for Unit Leaders) which prepared him to become a Staffelkapitän (squadron leader).

=== Squadron leader and death ===
Following completion at the Verbandsführerschule in November 1944, Linz was appointed Staffelkapitän of 12. Staffel of JG 5 on 30 November. He succeeded Leutnant Werner Gayko in this capacity. At the time, the Staffel was based at Herdla Airfield on the island of Herdla (now part of Askøy Municipality) in Western Norway. III. Gruppe to which 12. Staffel was subordinated was commanded by Hauptmann Franz Dörr. His 12. Staffel had just been converted from the Messerschmitt Bf 109 to the Focke-Wulf Fw 190 A at Bardufoss Airfield. On 1 January 1945, he was awarded the German Cross in Gold (Deutsches Kreuz in Gold).

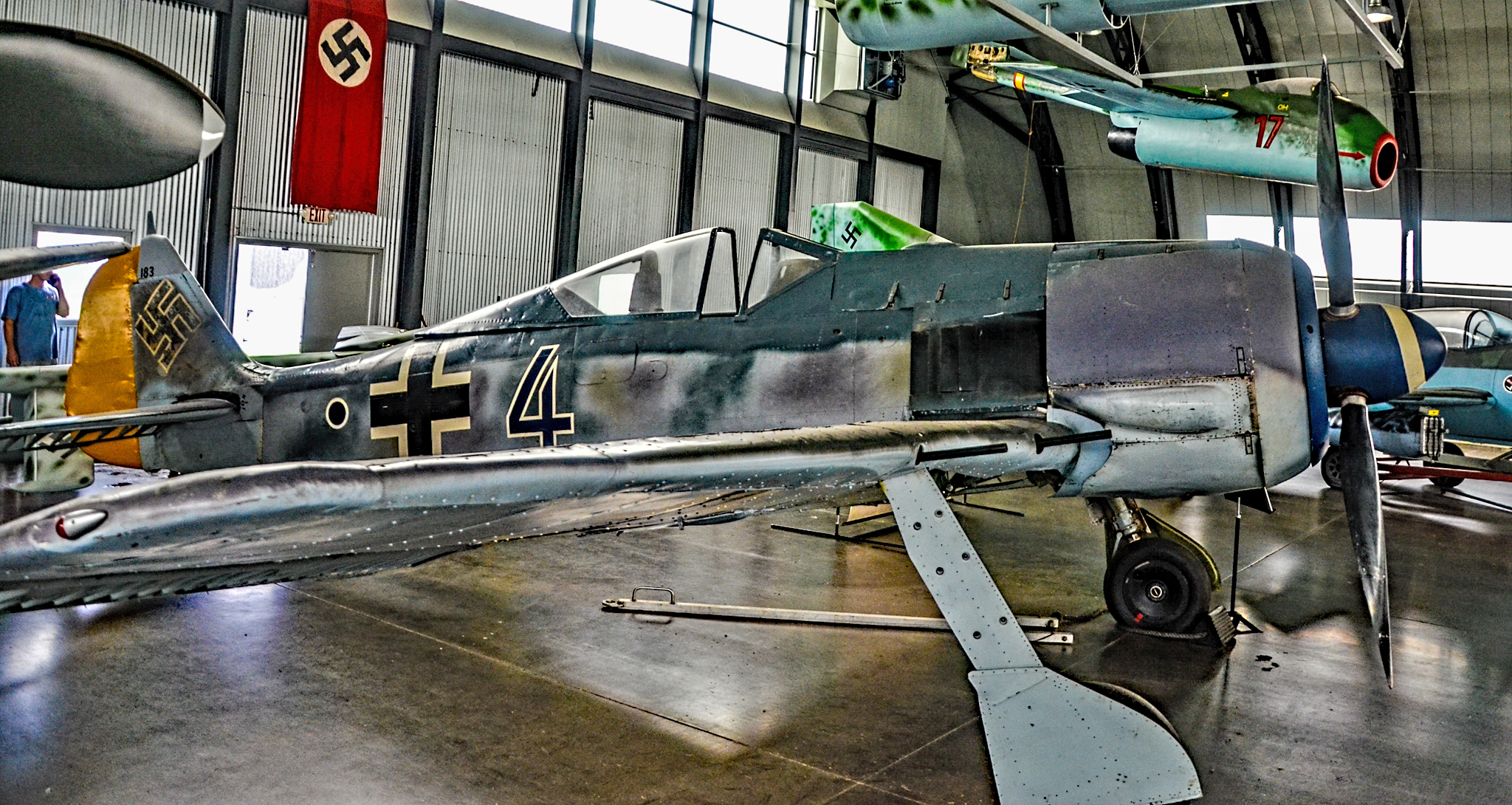
Fw 190 A-8 (Werknummer 732183—factory number) on display in the Military Aviation Museum.

On 9 February 1945, Linz was shot down and killed in action flying Fw 190 A-8 (Werknummer 732183—factory number) in defense of the German destroyer Z33 in an operation which was later called Black Friday by the Allied aircrews due to their heavy unit losses. The Narvik-class destroyer Z33 was the last German destroyer to leave northern Norway and sailed for Germany on 5 February 1945. It was intended that Z31, which had completed initial repairs at Bergen after being heavily damaged in the Action of 28 January 1945, would join her to make a joint passage to the Baltic. Z33 ran aground in Brufjord on 7 February, damaging her port shaft and propeller and causing both engines to fail. She was taken under tow to be repaired in Trondheim. Z33 and the two tugboats with her chose to shelter in Førde Fjord during daylight on 9 February while en route to Trondheim.

On the morning of 9 February, two Royal New Zealand Air Force Bristol Beaufighter torpedo bombers of No. 489 Squadron conducted a patrol of the Norwegian coast. These aircraft sighted a Narvik-class destroyer accompanied by a minesweeper and two flak ships in Førde Fjord. At 1:30 pm on 9 February, 32 Beaufighters were sent into the air from RAF Dallachy. The strike force was joined by either ten or twelve North American P-51 Mustang fighters from 65 Squadron and two Vickers Warwick air-sea rescue aircraft from 379 Squadron carrying life rafts to help any aircrew forced to ditch. The 9. and 12. Staffeln of JG 5 were scrambled from Herdla Airfield at 3:50 p.m. and ordered to attack the Dallachy Wing and its escorts. During this intercept mission, Linz and his wingman Feldwebel Rudolf Artner were the first Luftwaffe pilots to reach the bombers and both shot down one Beaufighter bomber each. Linz then claimed his final aerial victory over a P-51 fighter from No. 65 Squadron. Linz was then shot down.

Linz was buried at Bergen and posthumously awarded the Knight's Cross of the Iron Cross (Ritterkreuz des Eisernen Kreuzes) on 12 March. He was replaced by Oberleutnant Fritz Kohrt as commander of 12. Staffel. The Fw 190 A-8 flown by Linz in his last combat still exists, and is displayed in the Cottbus Hangar of the Military Aviation Museum in Pungo, Virginia, USA as of 2014.

== Summary of career ==
=== Aerial victory claims ===
According to US historian David T. Zabecki, Linz was credited with 70 aerial victories. Spick also lists him with 70 aerial victories claimed, all of which claimed on the Eastern Front in an unknown number combat missions. Mathews and Foreman, authors of Luftwaffe Aces — Biographies and Victory Claims, researched the German Federal Archives and found records for 53 aerial victory claims. This figure includes at least 51 aerial victories on the Eastern Front and two over the Western Allies.

Victory claims were logged to a map-reference (PQ = Planquadrat), for example "PQ 43 Ost 104557". The Luftwaffe grid map (Jägermeldenetz) covered all of Europe, western Russia and North Africa and was composed of rectangles measuring 15 minutes of latitude by 30 minutes of longitude, an area of about 360 square miles (930 km^{2}). These sectors were then subdivided into 36 smaller units to give a location area 3 km × 4 km (1.9 mi × 2.5 mi) in size.

Chronicle of aerial victories
This and the ♠ (Ace of spades) indicates those aerial victories which made Linz an "ace-in-a-day", a term which designates a fighter pilot who has shot down five or more airplanes in a single day. This and the ? (exclamation mark) indicates information discrepancies listed by Prien, Stemmer, Rodeike, Bock, Mombeek, Mathews, and Foreman.
Claim	Date	Time	Type	Location	Claim	Date	Time	Type	Location
– 8. Staffel of Jagdgeschwader 5 – Eastern Front and northern Norway, and Finland — 10 January – 31 December 1942
? (Note: This claim is not listed by Mathews and Foreman nor by Prien, Stemmer, Rodeike and Bock.)	30 May 1942	—	unknown		3? (Note: According to Mathews and Foreman this claim is unconfirmed.)	28 June 1942	16:40	Pe-2	PQ 42 Ost 103992
1	13 June 1942	13:25	Hurricane	Murmashi	4	7 July 1942	17:20	Hurricane	PQ 43 Ost 104557
2	23 June 1942	08:15	Hurricane						
– 8. Staffel of Jagdgeschwader 5 – Eastern Front and northern Norway, and Finland — September 1943 – 15 August 1944
5	23 September 1943	12:52	P-40		27♠	25 May 1944	21:35	Boston	northwest of Berlevåg
6	23 September 1943	12:57	P-40		28♠	25 May 1944	21:36	Boston	northwest of Berlevåg
7	24 September 1943	08:45	P-40		29♠	25 May 1944	21:37	Boston	northwest of Berlevåg
8	24 September 1943	08:55	P-39		30♠	25 May 1944	21:39	Boston	northwest of Berlevåg
9	24 February 1944	09:40	P-39	Lake Zog	31♠	25 May 1944	21:40	Boston	north-northwest of Berlevåg
10	8 March 1944	15:52	P-39	east of Lake Njamosero (Note: Lake Njamosero or Nyamozero is located at 66°58′00.7″N 31°27′59.9″E)	32♠	26 May 1944	04:59	Boston	north of Vadsø
11	7 April 1944	10:30	Yak-9	PQ 37 Ost SG-8/7	33♠	26 May 1944	05:02	Boston	northwest of Vadsø
12	23 April 1944	14:49	P-39	northeast of Berlevåg	34♠	26 May 1944	05:03	Boston	north-northwest of Vadsø
13	23 April 1944	14:51	P-39	northeast of Berlevåg	35♠	26 May 1944	05:05	P-40	north of Vadsø
14	23 April 1944	14:54	P-39	northeast of Berlevåg	36♠	26 May 1944	05:20	Boston	north of Vadsø
15	23 April 1944	15:00	P-39	northeast of Berlevåg	37	7 June 1944	12:08	P-39	southwest of Ura-Guba
16	10 May 1944	01:15	P-39	25 km (16 mi) southwest of Petsamo	38	7 June 1944	12:11	P-39	southeast of Ura-Guba
17	10 May 1944	01:35	P-39	45 km (28 mi) southeast of Petsamo	39	7 June 1944	12:15	P-39	south of Ura-Guba
18	10 May 1944	01:40	P-39	35 km (22 mi) east of Petsamo	40♠	17 June 1944	07:47	P-40	south-southeast of Kiberg
19	11 May 1944	03:18	Yak-9	PQ 37 Ost QE-9/1	41♠	17 June 1944	07:48	Il-2	south-southeast of Kiberg
20	11 May 1944	03:20	Yak-9	PQ 37 Ost RF-4/2	42♠	17 June 1944	07:55	P-39	southeast of Kiberg
21	13 May 1944	22:59	P-39	PQ 37 Ost RD-3/1	43♠	17 June 1944	07:58	P-39	southeast of Kiberg
22♠	16 May 1944	19:00	Il-2	PQ 37 Ost QB-6/3	44♠	17 June 1944	08:02	Yak-9	southeast of Kiberg
23♠	16 May 1944	19:01	Il-2	PQ 37 Ost QB-2/2	45♠	17 June 1944	21:31	P-39	southeast of Kiberg
24♠	16 May 1944	21:45	P-40	PQ 37 Ost QB-6/1	46♠	17 June 1944	21:32	P-39	southeast of Kiberg
25♠	16 May 1944	21:47	P-40	PQ 37 Ost QB-6/4	47♠	17 June 1944	21:34	P-39	northeast of Kiberg
26♠	16 May 1944	21:49	P-39	PQ 37 Ost QB-7/1	48♠	17 June 1944	21:36	Boston	northeast of Kirkenes
– 11. Staffel of Jagdgeschwader 5 – Eastern Front and northern Norway, and Finland — 15 August – 31 December 1944
49	17 August 1944	09:42	Yak-9	PQ 37 Ost TB-9, east-northeast of Salmiyarvi vicinity of Salmiyarvi	51	17 August 1944	10:00	P-40	PQ 37 Ost RB-9/3
50	17 August 1944	09:44	Yak-9	PQ 37 Ost TB-8	52	3 September 1944	09:21	Pe-2	PQ 37 Ost TD
– 12. Staffel of Jagdgeschwader 5 – Eastern Front and northern Norway, and Finland — December 1944 – 9 February 1945
53	9 February 1945	16:00	Beaufighter	north of Sogne Fjord	54	9 February 1945	16:00	P-51	near Horstad

=== Awards ===
- Iron Cross (1939) 2nd and 1st Class
- German Cross in Gold on 1 January 1945 as Oberfeldwebel in the 12./Jagdgeschwader 5
- Knight's Cross of the Iron Cross on 12 March 1945 (posthumously) as Leutnant and pilot in the 12./Jagdgeschwader 5
