= German destroyer Z34 =

Destroyer

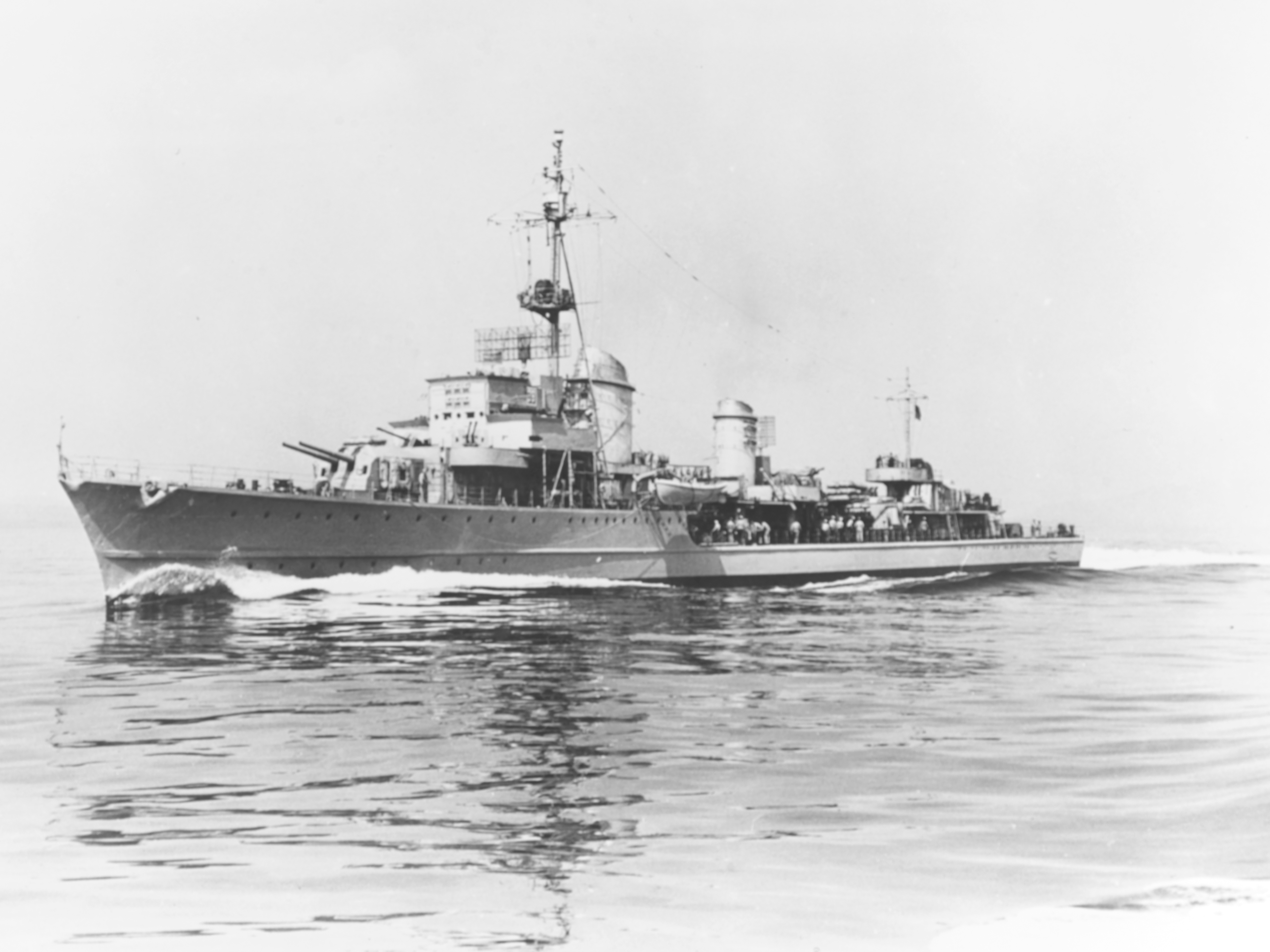
- Sister ship Z39 underway after the war

History

Nazi Germany
- Name: Z34
- Ordered: 19 September 1939
- Builder: AG Weser (Deschimag), Bremen
- Yard number: W1004
- Laid down: 15 January 1941
- Launched: 5 May 1942
- Completed: 5 June 1943
- Captured: 6 May 1945
- Fate: Scuttled, 26 March 1946

General characteristics (as built)
- Class & type: Type 1936A (Mob) destroyer
- Displacement: 2,657 long tons (2,700 t) (standard); 3,691 long tons (3,750 t) (deep load)
- Length: 127 m (416 ft 8 in) (o/a)
- Beam: 12 m (39 ft 4 in)
- Draft: 4.62 m (15 ft 2 in)
- Installed power: 70,000 PS (51,000 kW; 69,000 shp); 6 × water-tube boilers
- Propulsion: 2 × shafts; 2 × geared steam turbine sets
- Speed: 36 knots (67 km/h; 41 mph)
- Range: 2,950 nmi (5,460 km; 3,390 mi) at 19 knots (35 km/h; 22 mph)
- Complement: 316–336
- Armament: 1 × twin, 3 × single 15 cm (5.9 in) guns; 2 × twin 3.7 cm (1.5 in) AA guns; 2 × quadruple and 2 × single 2 cm (0.8 in) AA guns; 2 × quadruple 53.3 cm (21 in) torpedo tubes; 60 mines; 4 × depth charge launchers

Z34 was a Type 1936A (Mob) destroyer built for the Kriegsmarine (German Navy) during World War II. Completed in 1943, the ship spent all of 1944 in Norwegian waters, and was twice damaged by British aircraft attacking the battleship Tirpitz. She escorted troop convoys from northern Norway when the Germans began evacuating the area beginning in October. Z34 was transferred to the Baltic with two of her sister ships at the beginning of 1945 and participated in the action of 28 January 1945 when they were intercepted off the Norwegian coast by a pair of British light cruisers. The ship was only lightly damaged during the battle and all three destroyers were able to disengage.

Over the next several months, she escorted evacuation convoys and German cruisers as they bombarded Soviet positions. She also attacked Soviet troops with her own guns. Z34 was badly damaged by a Soviet torpedo in mid-April and had to be towed to port for emergency repairs. They sufficed to allow her to take a group of refugees and cut-off troops to Denmark in early May. After the end of the war the ship was surrendered to the Allies in Germany, and was allocated to the United States when they divided up the surviving ships of the Kriegsmarine. Still not fully repaired from the torpedo hit in 1945, the ship was scuttled in early 1946.

== Design and description ==
The Type 1936A (Mob) destroyers were slightly larger than the preceding Type 1936A class and had a heavier armament. The class had an overall length of 127 meters (416 ft 8 in) and were 121.9 meters (399 ft 11 in) long at the waterline. The ships had a beam of 12 meters (39 ft 4 in) and a maximum draft of 4.62 meters (15 ft 2 in). They displaced 2,657 long tons (2,700 t) at standard load and 3,691 long tons (3,750 t) at deep load. The two Wagner geared steam turbine sets, each driving one propeller shaft, were designed to produce 70,000 PS (51,000 kW; 69,000 shp) using steam provided by six Wagner water-tube boilers. The ships had a design speed of 36 knots (67 km/h; 41 mph), and their maximum speed was 36.1 knots (66.9 km/h; 41.5 mph). The Type 1936A (Mob) destroyers carried enough fuel oil to give a range of 2,239 nautical miles (4,147 km; 2,577 mi) at a speed of 19 knots (35 km/h; 22 mph). The crew of the ships numbered 11–15 officers and 305–21 enlisted men, plus an additional 4 officers and 19 enlisted men if serving as a flotilla flagship.

The Type 1936A (Mob) ships were armed with five 15-centimeter (5.9 in) TbtsK C/36 guns in a twin-gun turret forward and three single mounts with gun shields aft of the main superstructure. Their anti-aircraft armament varied and Z34's consisted of four 3.7-centimeter (1.5 in) Flak M42 guns in a pair of twin mounts abreast the rear funnel and ten 2-centimeter (0.79 in) C/38 guns in two quadruple and two single mounts. The ships carried eight 53.3-centimeter (21 in) torpedo tubes in two power-operated mounts. A pair of reload torpedoes was provided for each mount. They had four depth charge launchers and mine rails could be fitted on the rear deck that had a maximum capacity of 60 mines. A system of passive hydrophones designated as 'GHG' (Gruppenhorchgerät) was fitted to detect submarines. A S-Gerät sonar was also probably fitted. The ship was equipped with a FuMO 24/25 radar set above the bridge as well as a FuMB 34 radar detector.

=== Modifications ===
A FuMO 63 Hohentwiel radar was installed in 1944–1945 in lieu of the aft searchlight. Before 31 March 1945, a pair of 8.6 cm (3.4 in) RaG anti-aircraft rocket launchers were fitted. By the end of the war, Z34's light anti-aircraft gun armament consisted of one to three 4 cm (1.6 in), six 3.7 cm and sixteen 2 cm guns.

== Service history ==
Z34 was first ordered from Seebeckwerft (yard number 666) as a Type 1938B destroyer on 28 June 1939, but the Kriegsmarine cancelled the order in September 1939, re-ordering the ship from AG Weser (Deschimag) (yard number W1004) as a Type 1936A (Mob) destroyer on 19 September 1939. The ship was laid down at Deschimag's Bremen shipyard on 14 January 1941 and launched on 15 May 1942. Construction was slowed by shortage of manpower and materials and Z34 was not commissioned until 5 June 1943.

The ship sailed to Norway shortly after she finished working up on 1 November. The following month, she was one of the escorts for the battleship Scharnhorst during Operation Ostfront on 25 December, an attempt to intercept the British Convoy JW 55B that was bound for the Soviet Union. All of the battleship's escorts were detached the following day to increase the likelihood of intercepting the convoy and thus did not participate in the ensuing Battle of North Cape. Z34 remained in the Arctic throughout 1944 to defend the damaged battleship Tirpitz. Z34 was damaged during British airstrikes on 17 July and 29 August; her crew helped to put out a fire aboard the oil tanker SS C. A. Larsen during the latter attack. Beginning in October, the ship escorted convoys during Operation Nordlicht, the evacuation of northern Norway. On 1 December, she towed a damaged troopship into Hammerfest and then continued on to Tromsø where she began a refit on the 11th. On 22 January 1945, Z31, Z34 and Z38, laid minefields in Magerøya, Laafjord, and Brei Sounds.

On 25 January the three destroyers departed Tromsø for the Baltic. Three days later they were intercepted by a squadron of British ships, including the light cruisers Diadem, and Mauritius off the Sognefjord. During the ensuing Action of 28 January, Z31 was heavily damaged and the lightly damaged Z34 made several fruitless torpedo attacks on the cruisers to cover Z31's withdrawal. Laying smoke as they withdrew, the faster destroyers were able to outpace the cruisers and take shelter in Aspofjord protected by German coastal artillery. Z34 was only lightly damaged during the engagement and ferried 200 artillerymen from Kiel to Gotenhafen on 3 February. A week later she escorted the heavy cruiser Admiral Scheer as the latter bombarded Soviet positions near Frauenburg in support of the 4th Army. Over the next several months, Z34 evacuated refugees from Kolberg, escorted the heavy cruisers Admiral Scheer, Lützow, and Prinz Eugen during their bombardment missions, and bombarded Dievenov and Tolkemit herself. During the former action, the ship was credited with the destruction of twelve tanks and four anti-tank guns. She was lightly damaged by Soviet aircraft on 29 March. Two days later, Z34 was the first German ship to engage aircraft with her rockets.

In early April, the ship escorted the ocean liners Deutschland and Pretoria as they carried 17,000 refugees to Copenhagen, Denmark. Z34 began a brief refit on 4 April at Swinemünde and bombarded Soviet positions near Grossendorf on the 10th. During a duel with a Soviet coastal artillery battery at Oxhöft, a 15 cm shell prematurely detonated in the barrel and destroyed the gun. It was replaced by a weapon taken from the decommissioned Z33. While returning to Hela after another escort mission, the ship was attacked by two Soviet motor torpedo boats on the night of 15/16 April. She evaded one torpedo, but was struck by another. The hit flooded the aft turbine room, disabled both turbines, knocked out all power, and gave the destroyer a list to port. While drifting the next day, Z34 was attacked by Soviet aircraft and an anti-aircraft rocket detonated on deck, killing eight crewmen and wounding fourteen. She was towed into Swinemünde by the torpedo boat T36 and the minesweeper M204 where she received emergency repairs. The ship also had her light anti-aircraft armament augmented by weapons taken from the wreck of Lützow. On 4 May she arrived at Copenhagen with a full load of refugees and was decommissioned at Kiel on the 10th.

Z34 was allocated to the United States when the Allies divided the surviving ships of the Kriegsmarine amongst themselves in late 1945. Due to her poor state of repair, the United States Navy declined to make use of the ship and she was scuttled in the Skaggerak on 26 March 1946 with a load of chemical munitions aboard.

== Books ==
- Gröner, Erich (1990). German Warships 1815–1945. Vol. 1: Major Surface Warships. Annapolis, Maryland: Naval Institute Press. ISBN 0-87021-790-9.
- Koop, Gerhard & Schmolke, Klaus-Peter (2014). German Destroyers of World War II. Barnsley, UK: Seaforth Publishing. ISBN 978-1-84832-193-9.
- Rohwer, Jürgen (2005). Chronology of the War at Sea 1939–1945: The Naval History of World War Two (Third Revised ed.). Annapolis, Maryland: Naval Institute Press. ISBN 1-59114-119-2.
- Sieche, Erwin (1980). "Germany". In Chesneau, Roger (ed.). Conway's All the World's Fighting Ships 1922–1946. London: Conway Maritime Press. pp. 218–254. ISBN 0-85177-146-7.
- Whitley, M. J. (1991). German Destroyers of World War Two. Annapolis, Maryland: Naval Institute Press. ISBN 978-1-55750-302-2.
