= Black Friday (1945) =

Allied attack on German ships in Norway

"Black Friday" raid on Førde Fjord
- Part of the Second World War
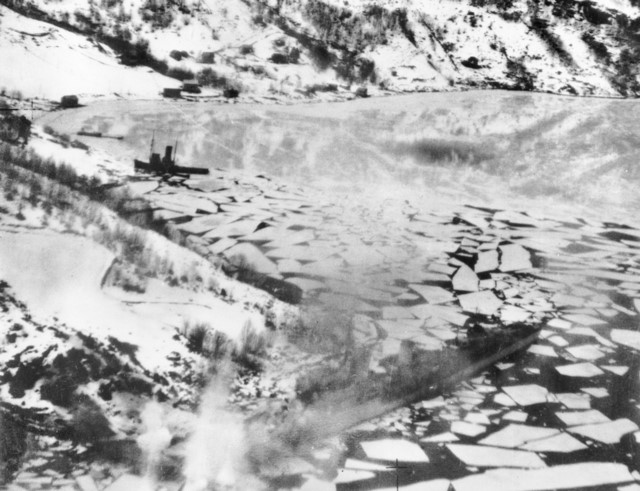
- Z33 under attack by Allied aircraft on 9 February 1945
Date	9 February 1945
Location	Førde Fjord, Norway 61°27′45″N 5°38′24″E
Result	German victory

Belligerents
Australia; Canada; New Zealand; United Kingdom	Germany

Commanders and leaders
(Australia) Colin Milson	

Strength
31 or 32 Beaufighters; 10 or 12 P-51 Mustangs; 2 Warwick ASR aircraft	12 Fw 190s; 1 destroyer; 3 to 9 escort warships

Casualties and losses
14 aircrew KIA; 4 POW; 9 Beaufighters; 1 P-51 Mustang	2 pilots, 7 sailors KIA; 4 or 5 Fw 190s
- Førde Fjord (Førdefjorden) a fjord in Sogn og Fjordane county, Norway

On 9 February 1945, near the end of the Second World War, a force of Allied Bristol Beaufighter aircraft suffered many losses during an attack on the German destroyer Z33 and its escorting vessels; the operation was called Black Friday by the survivors. The German ships were sheltering in a strong defensive position in the Førde Fjord in Sogn og Fjordane county, Norway, forcing the Allied aircraft to attack through massed anti-aircraft fire (FlaK).

The Beaufighters and their escort of Mustang Mk III fighters from 65 Squadron RAF were intercepted by twelve Focke-Wulf Fw 190s of Jagdgeschwader 5 (Fighter Wing 5) of the Luftwaffe. The Allies damaged at least two of the German ships for the loss of seven Beaufighters shot down by FlaK. Two Beaufighters and a Mustang were shot down by the Fw 190s and four or five of the German aircraft were shot down by the Allied aircraft, including that of the ace Rudi Linz.

The decision to attack Z33 and her escorts, rather than a nearby group of merchant ships, followed instructions from the Admiralty to RAF Coastal Command. The losses led to merchant ships being made the priority over destroyers and small warships. Another squadron of P-51 Mustangs was assigned to protect Allied aircraft operating near Norway from German fighters.

== Background ==
Due to Allied victories in France and Eastern Europe, German shipping was largely confined to the lower Baltic and Norwegian waters by late 1944. This left ports in Norway as Germany's last remaining bases for the Battle of the Atlantic and trade with Sweden. When the Baltic iced over during the winter of 1944–1945, Germany was forced to transport its vital imports of Swedish iron ore from the port of Narvik in northern Norway.

As German maritime transport routes through Norwegian waters increased in importance, Royal Air Force Coastal Command transferred seven squadrons of anti-shipping aircraft from bases in eastern England to northern Scotland during September and October 1944. Three squadrons equipped with Mosquito fighter-bombers were stationed at RAF Banff while a wing made up of four squadrons operating Beaufighter heavy fighters was based at RAF Dallachy. The Dallachy Wing comprised 144 Squadron RAF, 404 Squadron RCAF, 455 Squadron RAAF and 489 Squadron RNZAF. The four squadrons were veterans of many anti-shipping operations over the North Sea.

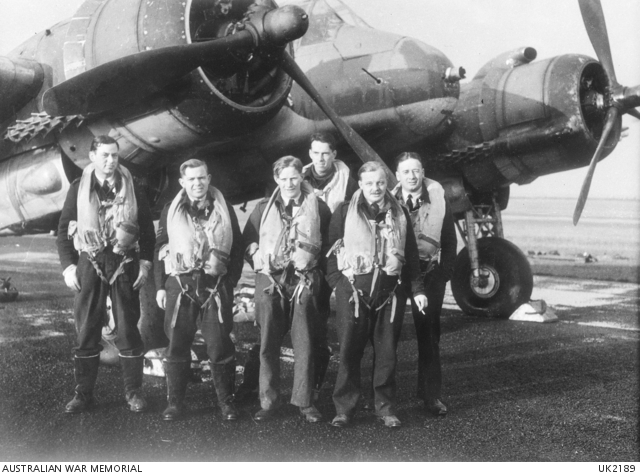
455 Squadron aircrew pose in front of a Beaufighter at RAF Dallachy in November 1944

Attacks by the Banff Wing quickly forced German ships travelling along the Norwegian coast to sail at night and take shelter in deep fjords during the day where they were very difficult to attack. To find German ships, the two wings sent out aircraft on almost daily patrols along the Norwegian coast from the Skagerrak to Trondheim. The Coastal Command squadrons developed a tactic of sending two 'outriders' ahead of the main body of the patrol; these aircraft had experienced aircrew and penetrated into fjords in search of shipping that might not be spotted by the other aircraft. By December 1944, patrols were also routinely escorted by RAF Mustang Mk III fighters and accompanied by Vickers Warwick air-sea rescue aircraft. Only one squadron of Mustangs was available, as these long-ranged fighters were needed to escort daylight raids by heavy bombers against Germany. German fighters began to be encountered off the Norwegian coast in December and from the end of the month it was common for Allied wing-sized operations near Norway to be attacked by groups of up to 30 fighters. In March 1945, the Luftwaffe had 85 single-engined and about 45 twin-engined aircraft operating from ten or twelve airfields south of Trondheim.

== Prelude ==
During the first weeks of 1945, the Allied strike wings flew few operations due to the winter weather. On 15 January, the Banff Wing was intercepted by 30 Fw 190 fighters from III. Gruppe of Jagdgeschwader 5 (III./JG 5) during a raid on the town of Leirvik. Five Mosquitos and five Fw 190s were shot down. By 9 February, 9. and 12. Staffeln, JG 5 were based at Herdla near Bergen, about 65 mi (105 km) to the south of Førde Fjord. These units were equipped with Fw 190s and 12. Staffel was commanded by Leutnant Rudi Linz, a 28-year-old flying ace with 69 'kills' to his credit.

The German Narvik-class destroyer Z33 had entered service in February 1943. She served in Norwegian waters from July of that year and saw combat on several occasions. She was the last German destroyer to leave northern Norway and sailed for Germany on 5 February 1945. It was intended that Z31, which had completed initial repairs at Bergen after being severely damaged in the Action of 28 January 1945, would join her to make a joint passage to the Baltic. Z33 ran aground in Brufjord on 7 February, damaging her port shaft and propeller and causing both engines to fail. She was taken under tow to be repaired in Trondheim. Z33 and the two tugboats with her chose to shelter in Førde Fjord during daylight on 9 February while en route to Trondheim.

== Battle ==
=== Preliminaries ===
On the morning of 9 February, two New Zealand Beaufighters of No. 489 Squadron conducted a patrol of the Norwegian coast. These aircraft first sighted a 1,500-ton merchant ship in Stongfjorden; continuing north, they were surprised to find a Narvik-class destroyer accompanied by a minesweeper and two flak ships in the Førdefjorden. The aircraft continued their patrol and spotted five large merchant ships in the Nordgulen and two minesweepers and a flak ship near Bremanger Municipality. Despite the pilots' surprise, the Allied command was aware that Z33 was in the area from Ultra signals intelligence.

The Dallachy Wing was on alert to attack any ships found by the reconnaissance patrol. Although the group of five merchant ships were highly vulnerable to attack and a worthwhile target, Coastal Command came under the operational command of the Admiralty and was bound by its decision to give higher priority to attacking warships than merchant vessels. The wing was dispatched against Z33 even though the destroyer and its escorts were well protected and in a difficult position for aircraft to attack.

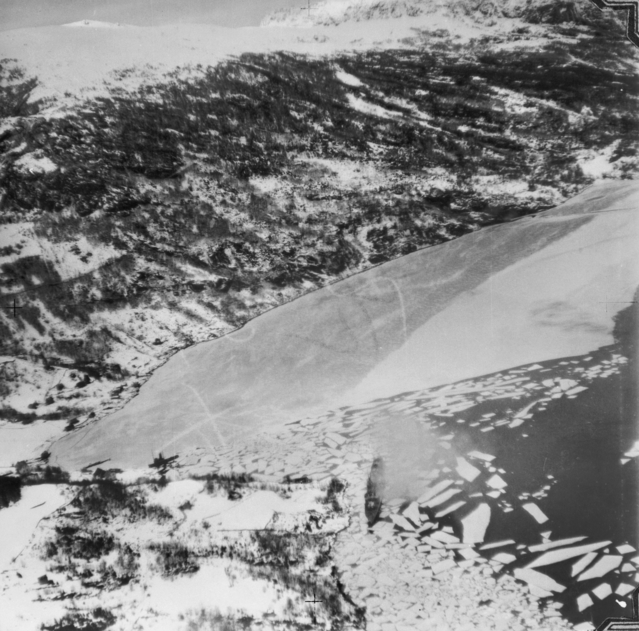
Z33 and another German ship in the position they sailed to after being detected on the morning of 9 February 1945

Wing Commander Jack Davenport, who had commanded No. 455 Squadron until October 1944 and was now on the staff of No. 18 Group RAF, planned the attack on Z33. The plan called for two 'outriders' to precede the main force and confirm the location of the German ships. The Beaufighters would then arrive to the east of the German anchorage, turn to the west and attack the ships before escaping over the sea. Davenport sought to minimise Allied casualties, but the location of the German ships in a narrow and protected fjord meant that the operation was inherently risky. The strike leader was Wing Commander Colin Milson, the 25-year-old commanding officer of No. 455 Squadron, a veteran of anti-shipping operations against Italian and German ships in the Mediterranean and North Seas. Milson had reservations about making what was likely to be a costly raid, particularly given that the war was clearly coming to an end but carried out the order to attack Z33.

After being spotted, the German ships sailed further up Førde Fjord and prepared for an Allied attack. Z33 and several of her escorts anchored close to the steep southern slopes of the fjord near the village of Bjørkedal. Other ships moored near the northern shore after breaking up pack ice with gunfire.^{(I)} This anchorage was also protected by flak batteries on the shore of the fjord.

=== Attack ===
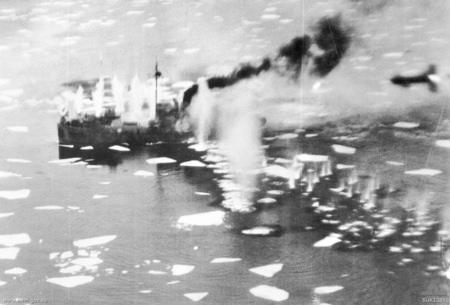
A German ship under attack in Førde Fjord

At 1:30 pm on 9 February, Milson led 31 or 32 Beaufighters into the air from Dallachy. The strike force was joined by either ten or twelve P-51 Mustang fighters from 65 Squadron and two Warwick air-sea rescue aircraft from 379 Squadron carrying life rafts to help any aircrew forced to ditch.^{(II)} All four of the Dallachy Wing squadrons contributed aircraft to the force. The 404 and 455 Squadron Beaufighters were armed with RP-3 (60 lb rockets) while the aircraft from 144 Squadron and the 489 Squadron Beaufighter were armed only with their four 20 mm cannon and six machine guns.

After the attackers crossed the Norwegian coast at 3:40 pm, two Beaufighters from 144 and 489 Squadrons detached themselves from the main force and pressed ahead as outriders. The outriders crossed Førde Fjord near where the German ships had been sighted that morning. At 3:50 p.m. they sent Milson a radio message stating that they could not see the ships. The 'outriders' then turned to the east and overflew the town of Førde before searching the next fjord to the north; during their flight near the Førde Fjord they did not spot the German warships in their new position. The 9 and 12 Staffeln of JG5 were scrambled from Herdla at 3:50 p.m. and ordered to attack the Dallachy Wing and its escorts.

Several minutes later, the main body of the raid reached the southern shore of Førde Fjord, travelling north. To their surprise, the aircraft passed over the German ships and came under intense fire from anti-aircraft guns, though no aircraft were hit. Milson wheeled his force to the right to attack the ships from east to west as planned but the steep walls of the fjord protected Z33 from attack from this direction. Milson led the force west to near the mouth of the fjord and ordered the Beaufighters to attack in relays from west to east. This required the aircraft to fly into the face of the German defences and then escape over steep mountains. The narrow confines of the fjord also meant that the Beaufighters had to attack in line from one direction, rather than by swamping the German defences as they usually did.

Milson led the first group of Beaufighters into Førde Fjord at about 4:10 p.m. His aircraft escaped undamaged after attacking a flak ship and other Beaufighters followed him into the fjord. At about this time 12 Fw 190s arrived at Førde Fjord and flew through German flak to intercept the Beaufighters waiting their turn to attack. The British Mustangs were taken by surprise but dived to intercept the German fighters. Over 50 aircraft either engaged in dogfights or dived to attack the German ships; it was the largest aerial engagement ever fought over Norway.

The engagement continued until 4:25 p.m. By that time the German ships had shot down seven Beaufighters and Fw 190As had claimed another two Beaufighters and a Mustang III. The Allied losses included six of the eleven 404 Squadron aircraft in the attack. The Germans killed 14 Allied airmen and took four prisoner of war. The Allies damaged Z33 and several of the other German ships and shot down either four or five Fw 190s.^{(III)} Linz and another German pilot were killed. Kriegsmarine fatalities included four sailors on Z33 and three on the converted trawler VP6808, both of the ships being damaged during the attack. There may also have been fatalities on the other German ships.

== Aftermath ==
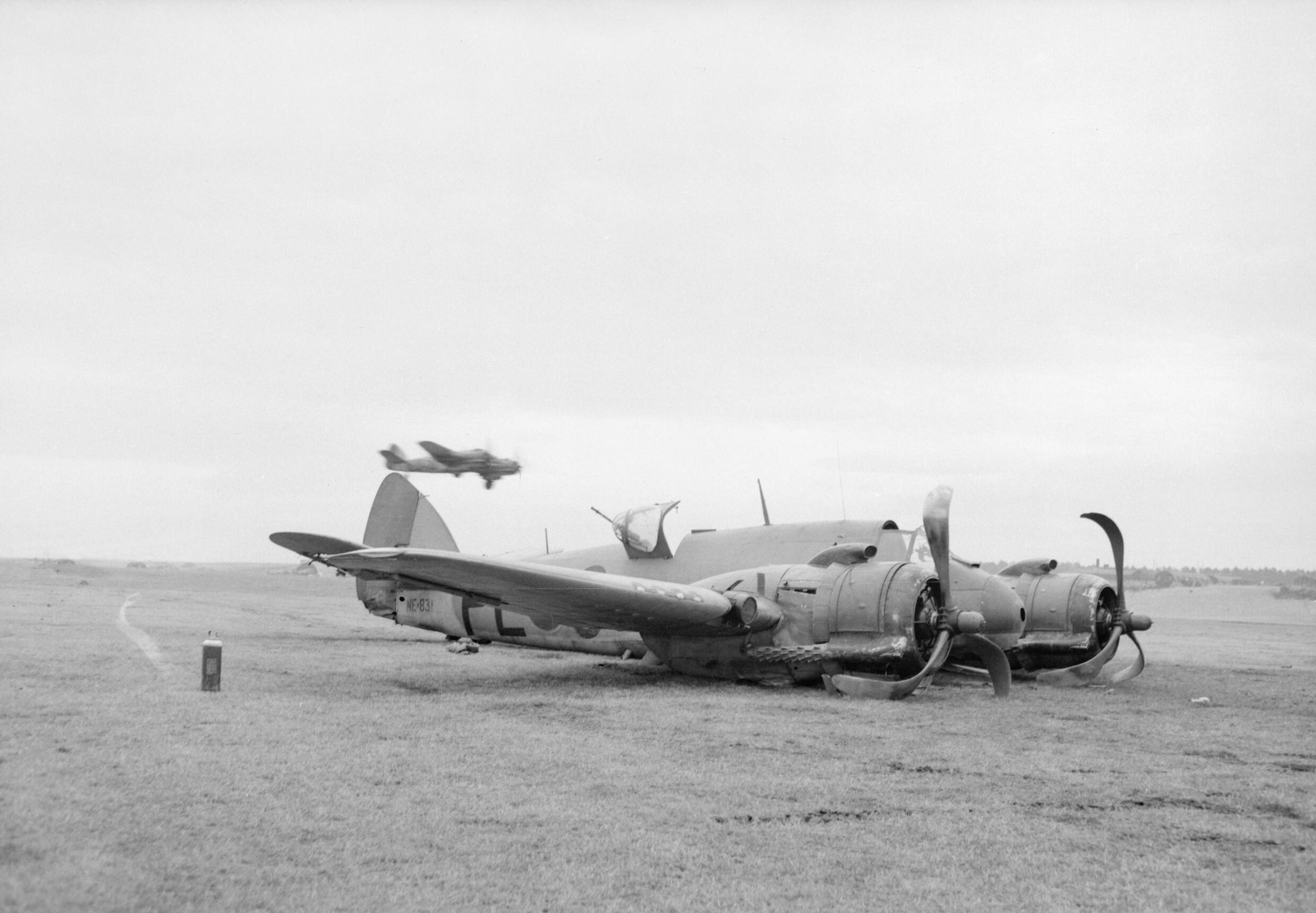
A No. 144 Squadron Beaufighter which made a belly landing at RAF Dallachy after suffering damage from Z33 and a Fw 190

After departing the Førde Fjord area, the surviving Beaufighters, many of which were damaged, returned to RAF Dallachy. Several had difficulty making safe landings and two made belly landings due to undercarriage damage but no further aircraft were lost. The air and ground crew were shocked by the scale of the losses and the battle became known as "Black Friday". The losses suffered by the Dallachy Wing on 9 February were the highest of any Coastal Command strike wing in one operation during the war.

The German fighters, many of which were short of fuel and ammunition, also broke off at about 4:25 p.m. and returned to base. On the night of 9/10 February, the German ships left Førde Fjord and continued their journey to Trondheim. A subsequent Allied attack on the ships by a different strike wing also failed. Z33 arrived in Trondheim on 11 February and was repaired and departed for Germany on 26 March, arriving safely at Swinemünde on 2 April. She did not see any further combat and was decommissioned at Brunsbüttel in late April as the Navy lacked the fuel needed to operate her.

The losses incurred during the raid on Førde Fjord led to changes in the tactics used by Coastal Command strike wings. Following the attack, the Admiralty agreed to a proposal by Air Chief Marshal Sir Sholto Douglas, the commander of Coastal Command, to assign a higher priority to attacking merchant vessels than to destroyers and small warships. A second squadron of Mustangs was also transferred to protect Coastal Command aircraft operating near Norway from early March. Milson was awarded a bar to his Distinguished Service Order on 13 July 1945 for his leadership and courage during the raid on Førde Fjord, which was described in the citation as a "brilliantly executed operation".

The raid was commemorated in Norway after the war. A monument to the aircrew killed in the battle was dedicated in the town of Førde on 8 May 1985, the 40th anniversary of Norway's liberation. This monument was later moved to Bergen Airport. The Air Combat Museum in the village of Naustdal also houses photos, maps, aircraft parts and other artefacts relating to the battle.

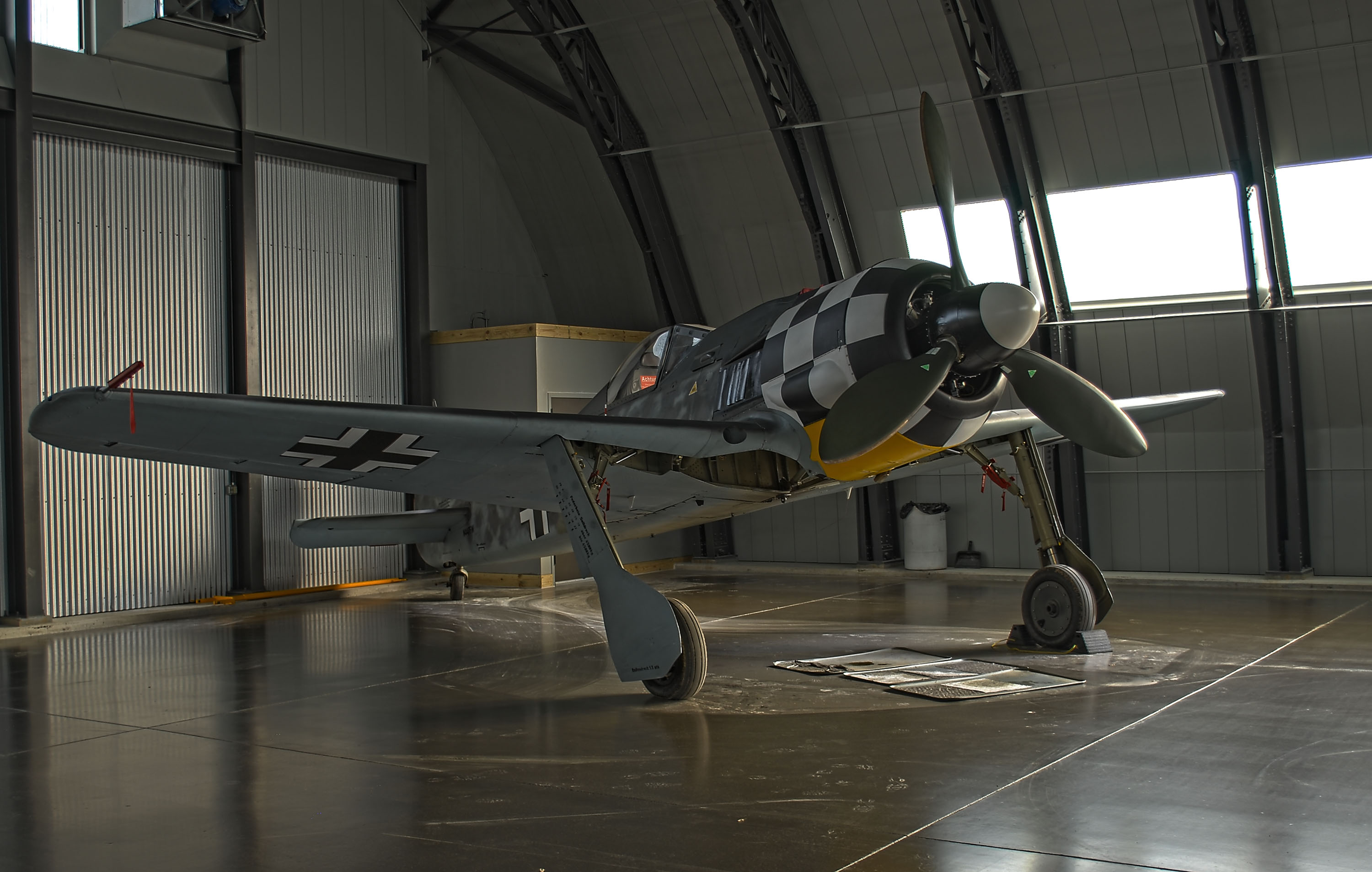
The Fw 190 flown by Rudi Linz during the battle, Military Aviation Museum, Pungo, Virginia, (2012)

Two of the Fw 190s of JG 5 that flew against the RAF Beaufighters and Mustangs survive, one, an F-model airframe with factory serial number or Werknummer of 931 862, that crashed as a result of the "Black Friday" aerial engagements was found and recovered in September 1983. It resides in Stow, Massachusetts, and had been under restoration by the "White 1 Foundation" of Kissimmee, Florida towards a resumption of full flightworthy status, until its 2012 transfer to the Collings Foundation's facilities in the Bay State to complete the work towards airworthiness. While still in Florida, in 2005 its last pilot, the former Luftwaffe Unteroffizier Heinz Orlowski visited it and sat in the cockpit of his Fw 190F-8, some sixty years after he last flew it and five years before his death in 2010. The other example, an Fw 190A-8 bearing the Werknummer 732 183 was flown by Rudi Linz in the engagement. His Fw 190A-8 is displayed in the Cottbus Hangar of the Military Aviation Museum in Pungo, Virginia, United States as of 2014. Note: The picture in this section of a replica Fw 1900A-8 is not that of Ltn Rudi Linz' "Blue 4", but of a replica wearing a JG 1 scheme. The museum now has the partially restored artefact (AGO Werks No. 732 183) in this hangar in its correct 12. / JG 5 "Blue 4" scheme.

The locations of several of the Beaufighters—gravesites—were found by marine archaeologist Rob Rondeau and diving crew 60 years later. One site was given a commemorative plaque, in the presence of a surviving Canadian airman, Herbert (Bert) Ramsden, who participated in the action and a sister of an airman who died there.

== Notes ==
=== Footnotes ===
- ^(I) The number of German ships accompanying Z33 in Førde Fjord at the time of the Allied attack differs between sources. Ashworth (1992), p. 122 gives a figure of one minesweeper and two flak ships, Alexander (2009), p. 181 refers to her having "minesweeper and flak-ship escorts", Brereton (1994), p. 472 gives a figure of two M-class minesweepers, a sperrbrecher and "at least two other flak ships", Conyers Nesbit (1995), p. 224 states that she was protected by two M-class minesweepers, a sperrbrecher and "several flak ships", Goulter (1995), p. 254 gives a defensive strength of two M-class minesweepers and a sperrbrecher while Milson (2010), p. 51 writes that the destroyer was protected by "nine anti-aircraft escorts and armed tugs".
- ^(II) The number of Allied aircraft involved in the attack also differs between sources. Conyers Nesbit (1995), p. 221, Milson (2010), p. 51 and Parry (2002), p. 47 state that the force comprised 32 Beaufighters and 10 Mustangs. Alexander (2009), p. 181 and Greenhous (1994), p. 472 give a figure of 32 Beaufighters and 12 Mustangs. Goulter (1995), p. 254 states that the force was made up of 31 Beaufighters and 12 Mustangs.
- ^(III) Goulter (1995), p. 254 and Milson (2010), p. 54 state that four Fw 190s were shot down while Conyers Nesbit (1995), p. 228 and Greenhous (1994), p. 473 state that five Fw 190s were downed. Greenhous wrote that his figure is sourced from German records.
