= Action of 28 January 1945 =

1945 naval battle

- Part of the Second World War
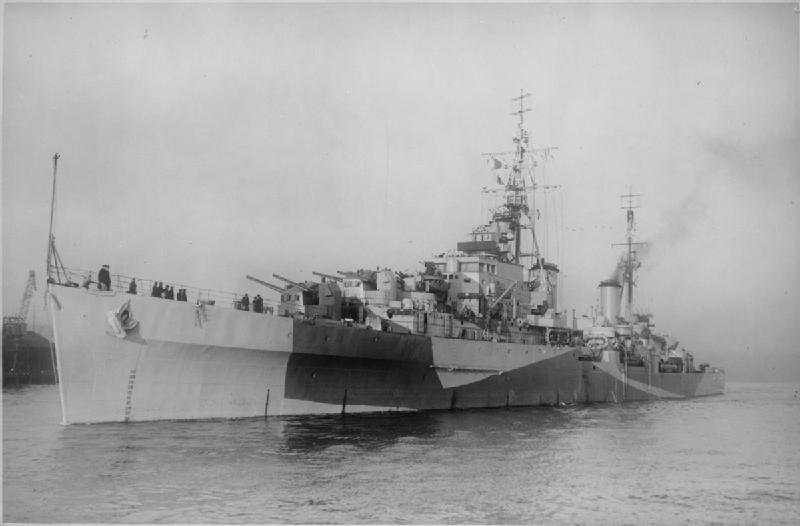
- HMS Diadem in 1944
Date	27/28 January 1945
Location	Waters off Bergen, Norway
Result	Inconclusive

Belligerents
United Kingdom	Germany

Commanders and leaders
(United Kingdom) Frederick Dalrymple-Hamilton	(Nazi Germany) H.F. von Wangenheim (Nazi Germany) Karl Hetz

Strength
2 light cruisers	3 destroyers Shore batteries

Casualties and losses
1 killed, 3 wounded 2 light cruisers lightly damaged	55 killed, 24 wounded 1 destroyer heavily damaged 1 destroyer lightly damaged

The action of 28 January 1945 was an inconclusive naval battle of the Second World War fought between two British Royal Navy light cruisers and three Kriegsmarine (German navy) destroyers near Bergen, Norway. The battle was the last of many actions between British and German warships off Norway during the war and the second-to-last surface engagement to be fought by the Kriegsmarine. It resulted in heavy damage to one of the German destroyers and light damage to another destroyer and both British cruisers.

Shortly after midnight on the night of 27/28 January, as the three destroyers of the German 4th Destroyer Flotilla were sailing from northern Norway to the Baltic Sea, they were intercepted by the British cruisers HMS Diadem and Mauritius. The destroyers Z31 and Z34 were damaged by gunfire but the German flotilla outran the slower British ships and escaped. The German warships eventually reached the Baltic, though Z31 was delayed until repairs were completed in Norway.

== Background ==
The Kriegsmarine's 4th Destroyer Flotilla comprised the Narvik-class destroyers Z31, Z34, and Z38. By January 1945, these ships had been stationed in northern Norwegian waters for three and a half years, but had only occasionally put to sea during 1944. Due to Germany's deteriorating position, the flotilla was directed in January to leave Norwegian waters and return to the Baltic. The three destroyers departed Tromsø on the 25th of the month.

The Royal Navy's Home Fleet conducted a number of attacks on German shipping travelling off the coast of Norway during January 1945. These included successful attacks by motor torpedo boats on three escorted ships between 6 and 8 January and the interception of a convoy by the heavy cruiser HMS Norfolk and light cruiser HMS Bellona near Egersund on the night of 11/12 January. On 27 January, the escort carriers HMS Campania, Nairana and Premier departed the Home Fleet's main base at Scapa Flow to conduct a raid against shipping near Vaago which was designated Operation Winded. The carriers were escorted by the heavy cruiser HMS Berwick and six destroyers.

The British were alerted to the 4th Destroyer Flotilla's movement by Ultra signals intelligence. The commander of the Home Fleet, Admiral Henry Moore, was informed that the destroyers had sailed on 27 January, shortly after the three carriers and their escort had put to sea. He believed that the German ships were likely to use a route between the coastal islands and the shore, as was common for the Kriegsmarine. If this route was used, it would be preferable for strike aircraft of No. 18 Group RAF to attack the destroyers as Norway's inshore waters were protected by naval mines and coastal batteries. Alternatively, the German ships could make a high-speed night passage outside of the coastal islands. In case an offshore route was used, Moore ordered Vice Admiral Frederick Dalrymple-Hamilton, the commander of the 10th Cruiser Squadron, to sail with the cruisers Diadem and Mauritius and patrol off Bergen. The Home Fleet did not have any destroyers available to accompany Dalrymple-Hamilton's force, though Moore considered but decided against cancelling the carrier operation in order to make some of these ships available.

== Action ==
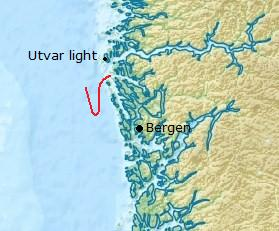
Approximate route of the German and Allied ships during the action

Contrary to British expectations, the commander of the 4th Destroyer Flotilla, Captain H.F. von Wangenheim, chose to take the faster route outside of the coastal islands. On the evening of 27 January, the destroyers were spotted and attacked by British aircraft whilst west of Sognefjord, but continued their voyage. Contact was made between the two naval forces at 00:48 am on 28 January. At this time, the 4th Destroyer Flotilla was proceeding south and was located about 15 miles (13 nmi; 24 km) southwest of the Utvær lighthouse and 35 miles (30 nmi; 56 km) northwest of Bergen. The sea was calm and visibility was excellent due to a full moon. The British and German forces spotted each other simultaneously; at the time the cruisers were about 11 miles (9.6 nmi; 18 km) west of the 4th Destroyer Flotilla. Upon sighting the destroyers, the British ships fired star shells to illuminate the area and turned to the south on a course parallel to that of the German ships.

Z31 suffered extensive damage early in the engagement. She was struck by seven 6 in (152 mm) shells, which caused her to catch fire, damaged the hydrophone compartment and torpedo transmitting stations and destroyed her forward gun turret. Z31's speed was not affected but 55 sailors were killed and another 24 wounded. After Z31 was damaged, Commander Karl Hetz on board Z34 assumed command of the flotilla. Z34 made two torpedo attacks on the British cruisers to force them to change course but failed. Z38 also tried to launch torpedoes but had to break off this attack when her funnel caught fire and a boiler tube burst. Z34 suffered a hit on her waterline during this period.

After Z34 was damaged, Hetz decided to turn to the north to outrun the British cruisers. Z34 fired a third salvo of torpedoes as the flotilla made this turn, again without result and the three ships laid smoke screens to conceal their position. The two cruisers also turned north to chase the German ships. A running fight began in which Mauritius sustained a hit on her mess deck that did not cause any casualties and Diadem was struck on her boat deck by a shell six minutes later that killed one man and wounded three. The German destroyers were capable of making 38 knots (70 km/h; 44 mph) while Diadem had a maximum speed of 32 knots (59 km/h; 37 mph) and Mauritius 31 knots (57 km/h; 36 mph). The German vessels gradually pulled ahead and came under the protection of shore batteries at about 2:00 am. The British ships broke off the pursuit and returned to Scapa Flow after these batteries fired on them.

== Aftermath ==
Early in the morning of 28 January, the 4th Destroyer Flotilla resumed its journey south and put into Bergen. Z31 entered the docks to be repaired while Z34 and Z38 departed on the evening of 28 January. The two ships were attacked from the air the next day but did not suffer any damage and sheltered in a fjord south of Stavanger until dark. They put to sea again on the evening of 29 January and reached Kiel in Germany on 1 February.

At Bergen, Z31 received initial repairs, which included removing the wreckage of her forward turret. She departed the town on 8 February bound for Horten. After arriving she received further repairs and had her anti-aircraft armament upgraded. Her forward turret was not replaced but a 4.1 in (100 mm) gun was mounted instead; this was intended to be a temporary measure but remained in place for the remainder of her career. After these repairs were completed, Z31 eventually reached Gotenhafen on 15 March. The last German destroyer remaining in northern Norwegian waters, Z33, sailed for Germany on 5 February 1945 but ran aground and suffered further damage in the Allied Black Friday air raid on the ninth of the month. Following repairs, she arrived at Swinemünde on 2 April.

The British and German navies were dissatisfied with the results of the engagement on 28 January. The British were disappointed with the inconclusive result and Moore regretted his decision to not cancel the escort carrier operation so that destroyers could be attached to the cruiser force. Historians have judged that the combination of excellent visibility on the night of 27/28 January and the superior speed of the German destroyers meant that the British had no ability to force a result. In a post-war assessment, First Sea Lord Admiral Andrew Cunningham endorsed the tactics Dalrymple-Hamilton used during the engagement but stated that the size of the British force was "inadequate". The Kriegsmarine was also unsatisfied with the conduct of the battle, with German naval authorities believing that the destroyers should have taken shelter in coastal waters after they were sighted by Allied aircraft on the evening of 27 January.

The Action of 28 January was the final engagement between British and German warships in Norwegian waters during World War II. It was also the second last surface action fought by the Kriegsmarine, with its final engagement taking place on 18 March 1945 when a force of two torpedo boats and a destroyer was defeated by two British destroyers in the Battle of the Ligurian Sea. By this time, most of the Kriegsmarine's remaining warships were stationed in the Baltic Sea where they supported German military operations and the evacuation of civilians until the end of the war in May.

== Bibliography ==
- Brown, J.D. (2009). Hobbs, David (ed.). Carrier Operations in World War II. Annapolis, Maryland: Naval Institute Press. ISBN 978-1-59114-108-2.
- Cunningham, Andrew (2006). The Cunningham Papers: Selections from the Private and Official Correspondence of Admiral of the Fleet Viscount Cunningham of Hyndhope, O.M., K.T., G.C.B., D.S.O. and Two Bars. Farnham, Surrey: Ashgate Publishing. ISBN 0-7546-5598-9.
- Koop, Gerhard; Schmolke, Klaus-Peter (1995). German Destroyers of World War II. London: Greenhill Books. ISBN 1-85367-540-7.
- O'Hara, Vincent P. (2004). The German Fleet at War, 1939–1945. Annapolis, Maryland: Naval Institute Press. ISBN 1-59114-651-8.
- Rohwer, Jurgen (2005). Chronology of the War at Sea 1939–1945: The Naval History of World War Two. Annapolis, Maryland: Naval Institute Press. ISBN 1-59114-119-2.
- Roskill, S. W. (2004) [1961]. Butler, J. (ed.). The War at Sea 1939–1945: The Offensive Part II 1st June 1944 – 14th August 1945. History of the Second World War Military Series (pbk. repr. Imperial War Museum Department of Printed Books and Naval & Military Press, Uckfield ed.). London: HMSO. ISBN 978-1-84342-806-0.
- Smith, Peter Charles; Dominy, John (1981). Cruisers in Action, 1939–1945. London: W. Kimber. ISBN 0-7183-0218-4.
- Whitley, M. J. (1991). German Destroyers of World War Two. Annapolis, Maryland: Naval Institute Press. ISBN 1-55750-302-8.
