= 3.7 cm Flak M42 =

3.7 cm/69 Flak M42
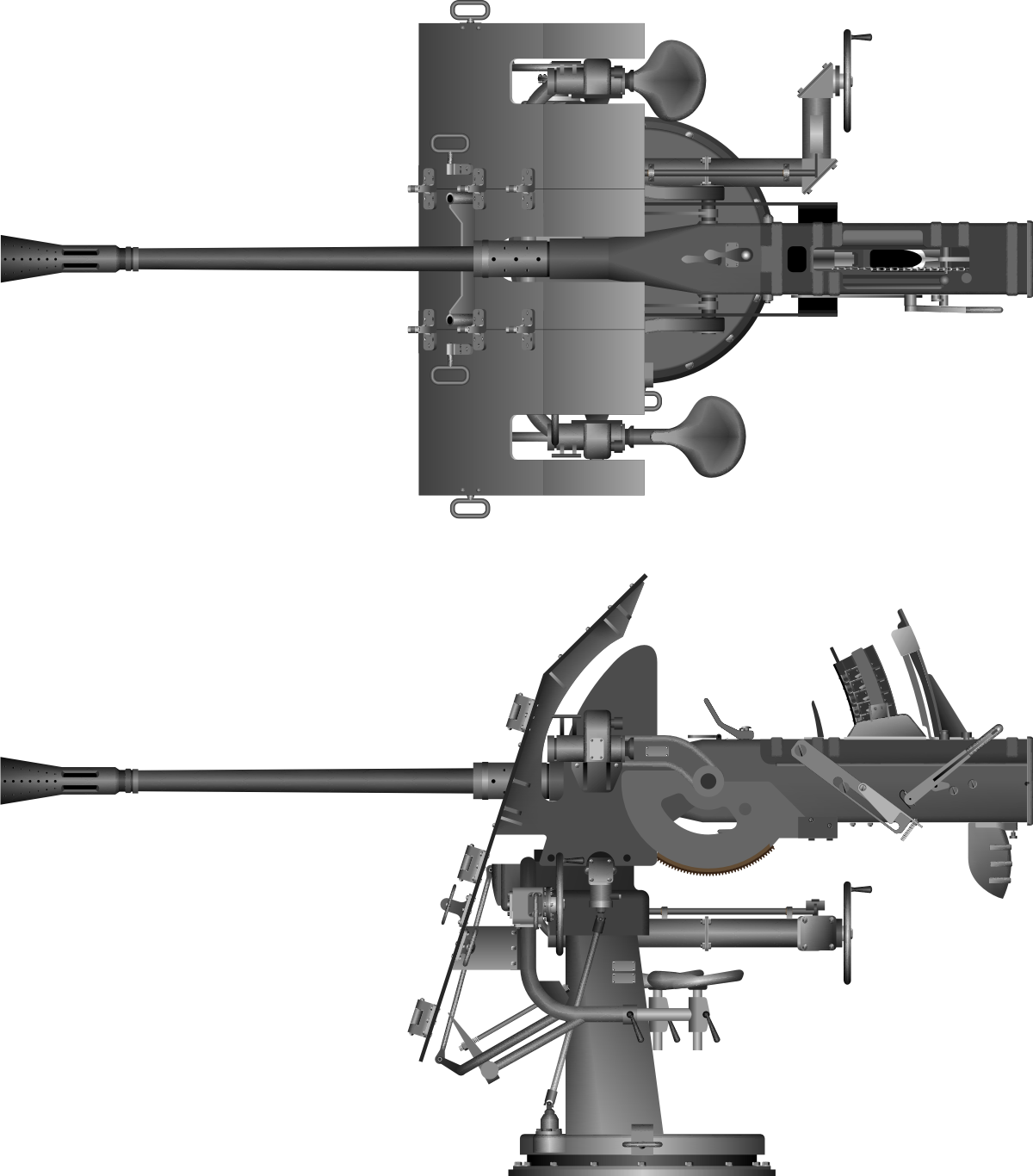
- A single 3.7 cm Flak M42U gun on the LM 42U mount.
- Type: Anti-aircraft gun
- Place of origin: Nazi Germany

Service history
- In service: 1943–1945
- Used by: Kriegsmarine
- Wars: World War II

Production history
- Designed: 1942
- Manufacturer: Rheinmetall-Borsig
- Produced: 1943–1945

Specifications (3.7 cm Flak M42)
- Mass: 109 kg (240 lb)
- Barrel length: 2.56 cm (1.01 in) bore (69 calibers)
- Crew: 3–4
- Shell: 37 × 249R
- Shell weight: 635–700 g (1.400–1.543 lb)
- Caliber: 37 mm (1.5 in)
- Action: Recoil-operated
- Breech: sliding breech block
- Elevation: -10° to +90°
- Traverse: 360°
- Rate of fire: 250 rounds per minute (cyclic)
- Muzzle velocity: 815–865 m/s (2,670–2,840 ft/s)
- Effective firing range: 4,800 m (5,200 yd) at 85° elevation; 6,400 m (7,000 yd) at 45° elevation
- Feed system: 5-round clips

The 3.7 cm Flak M42 was the marine version of the 3.7-centimetre (1.5 in) Flak 36/37 and used by the Kriegsmarine on surface ships and as the M42U on Type VII and Type IX U-boats. The 3.7 cm Flak M42U used several types of mounts and entered service in autumn 1943.

== 3.7 cm Flak M42 ==
The 3.7 cm Flak M42 was a longer caliber version of the Wehrmacht's 3.7 cm Flak 36, 69 caliber as opposed to 57 caliber. It replaced the older 3.7 cm SK C/30 that had been designed in 1930. The gun was loaded with a five-round ammunition clip, giving it a rate of fire of 250 rounds per minute, unlike the SK C/30 which was single-shot with a rate of 30 rounds per minute. The M42 was also about 134 kg (295 lb) lighter than the SK C/30 and had gun shields.

=== LM 42U Mount ===
The LM 42U mount was developed specifically for the 3.7 cm Flak M42U. It was manned by a 3-man crew, with a fourth man operating as the loader.

=== DLM 42U Mount ===
The twin mount was based on the LM 42U design, in which the 3.7 cm Flak M42U guns were mounted side by side.

=== LM 43U Mount ===
The LM 43U mount was the final design of mount used on U-boats. It was a further improvement on the LM 42U. The LM 43U was only known to be installed on these U-boats (U-249, U-826, U-977, U-1023, U-1171, U-1305 and U-1306).

== Gallery ==
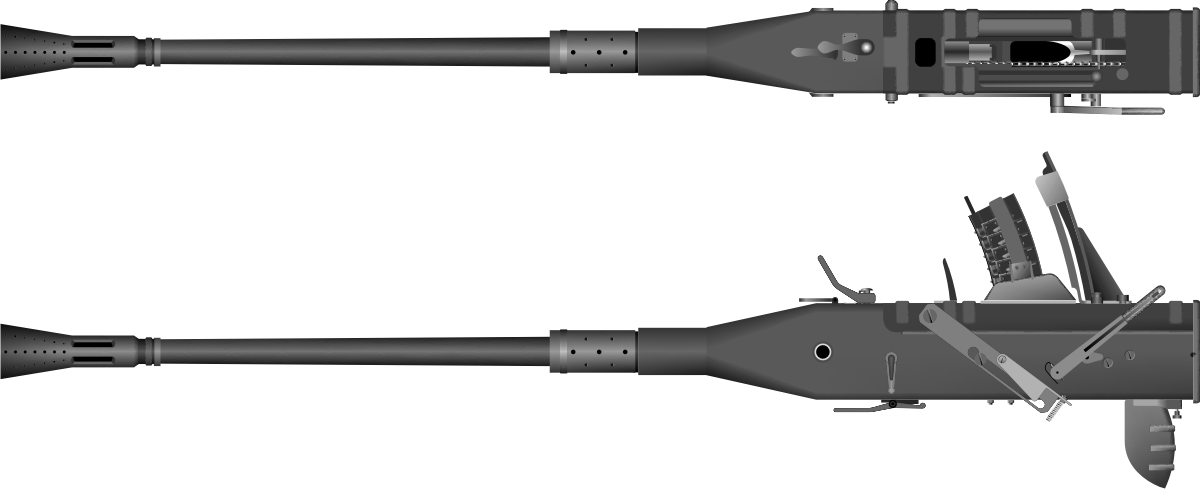
3.7 cm Flak M42U used on U-boats.

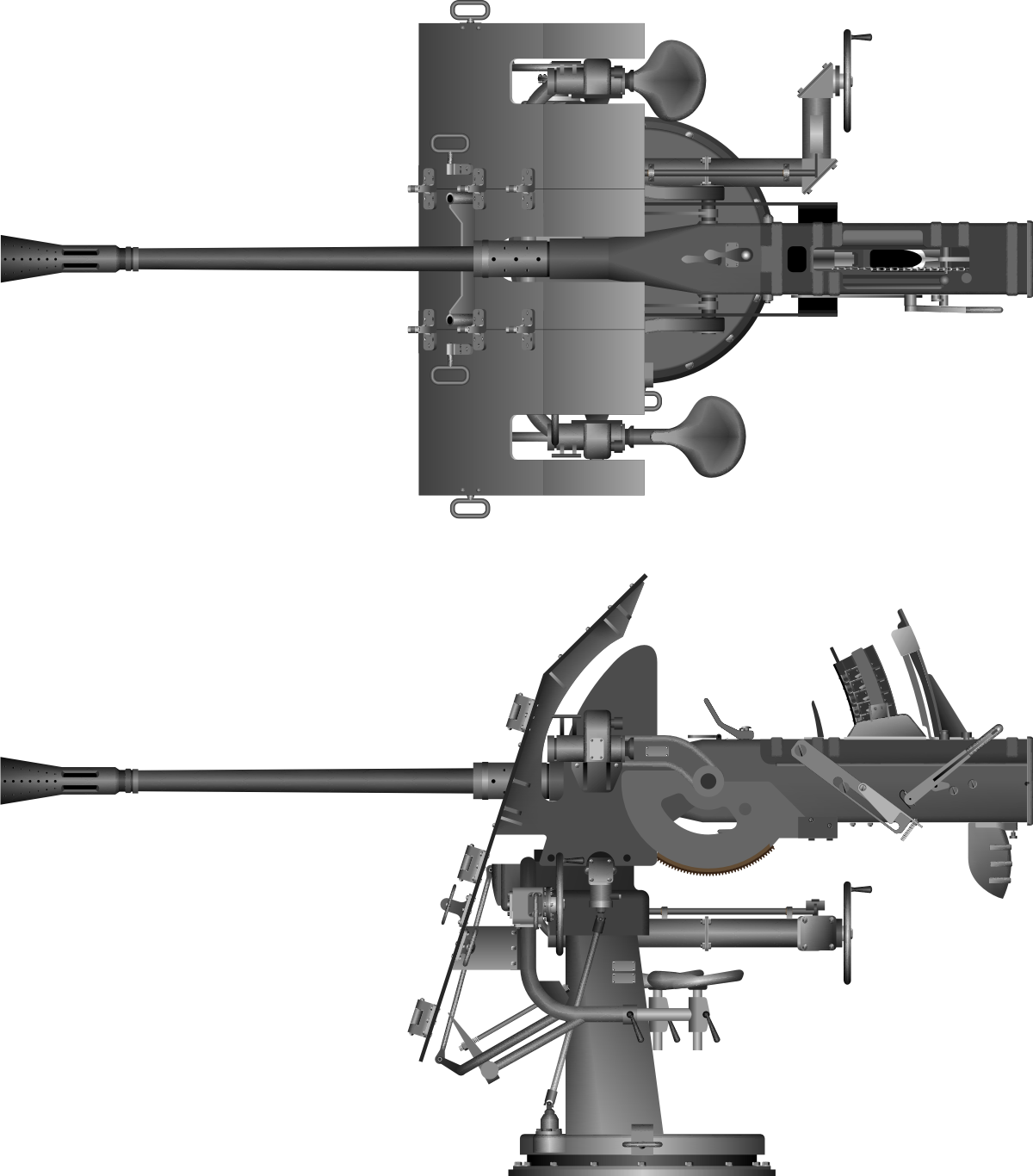
A single 3.7 cm Flak M42U gun on the LM 42U mount.

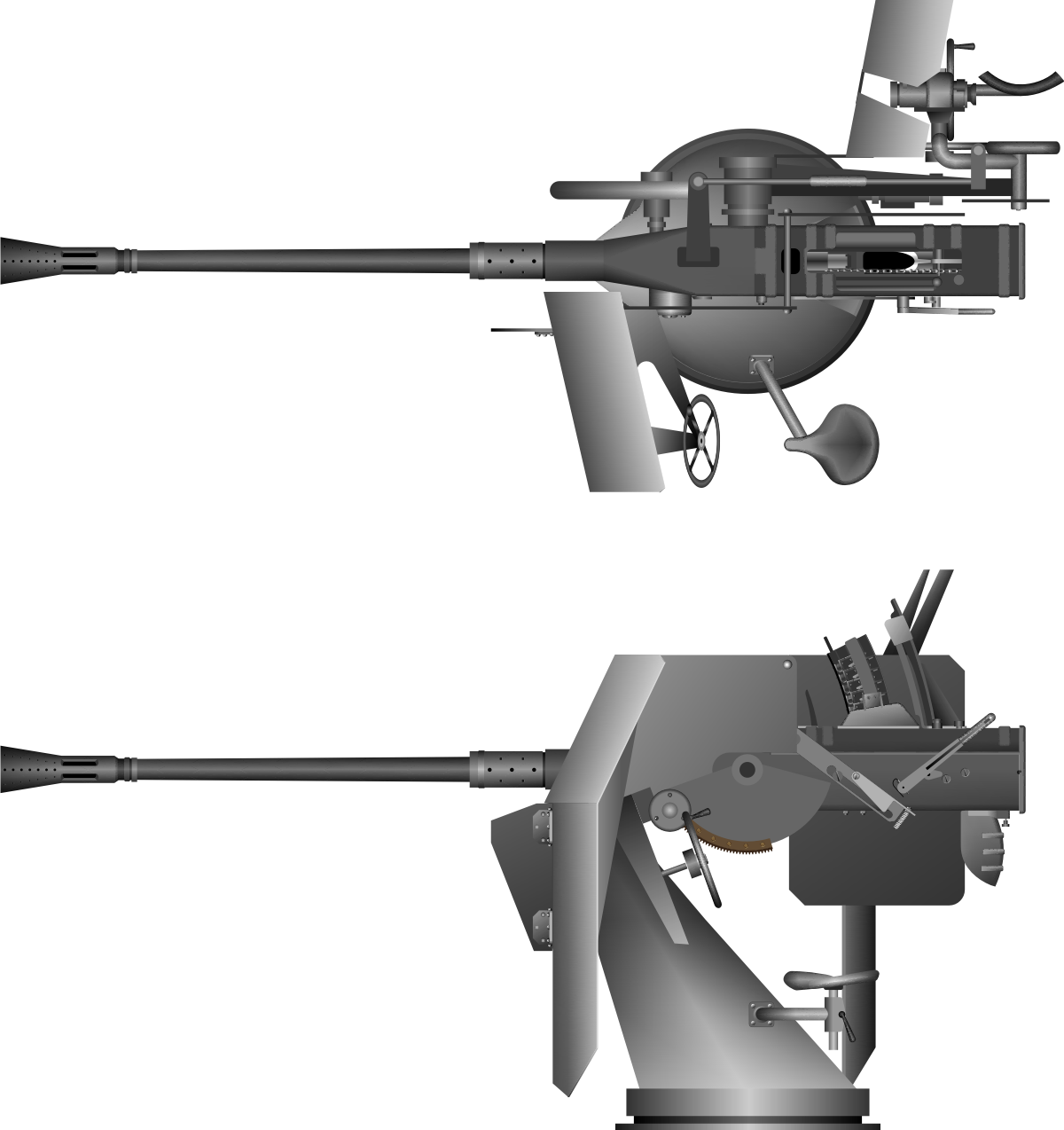
A single 3.7 cm Flak M42U gun on the LM 43U mount.

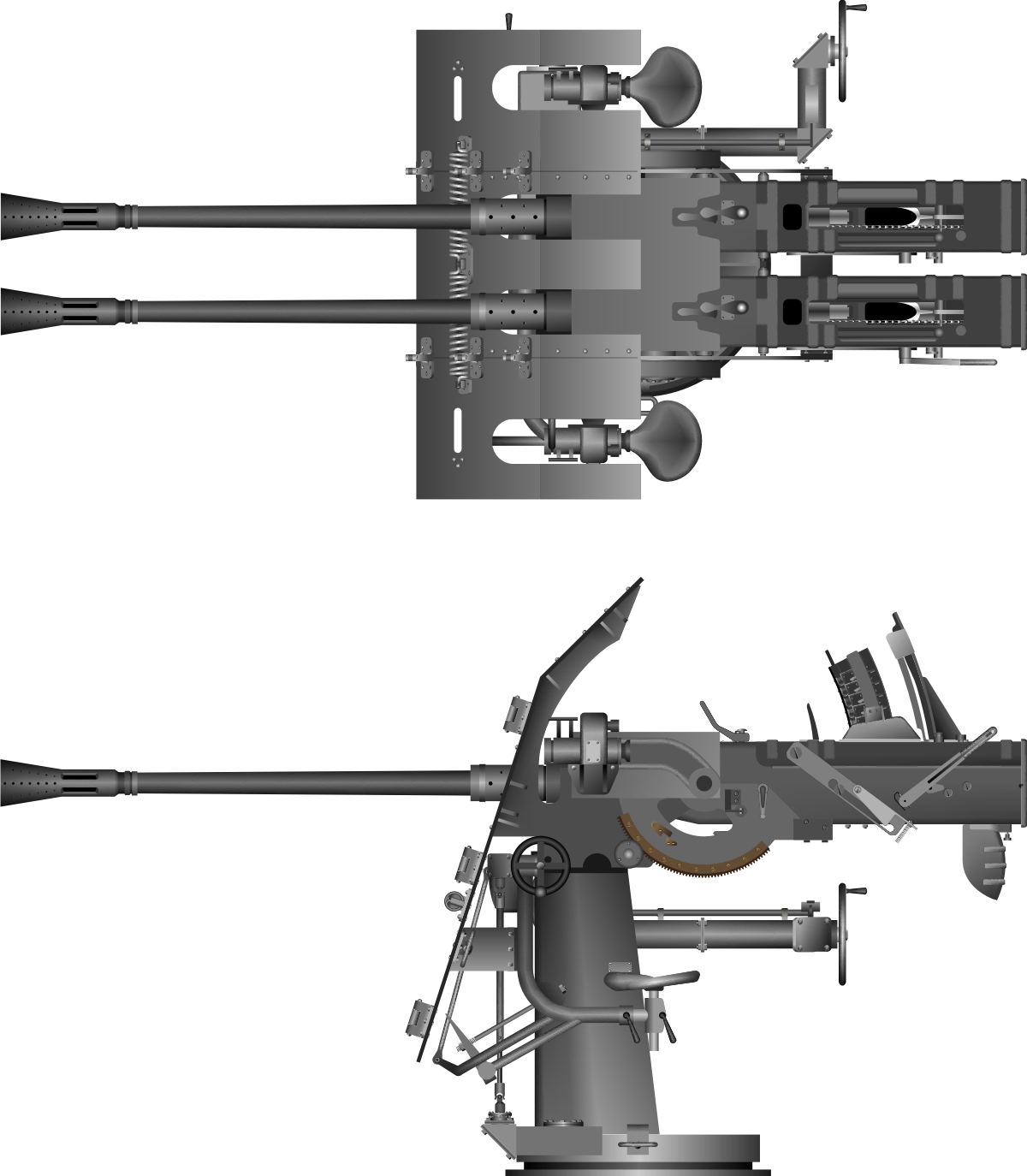
Twin 3.7 cm Flak M42U guns on the DLM 42U mount.

== Bibliography ==
- Campbell, John (1985). Naval Weapons of World War II. Annapolis, Maryland: Naval Institute Press. ISBN 0-87021-459-4.
- DiGiulian, Tony (30 November 2016). "Germany 3.7 cm/69 (1.5") Flak M42". NavWeaps.
- DiGiulian, Tony (30 April 2017). "Germany 3.7 cm/83 SK C/30". NavWeaps.
- Skwiot, Miroslaw (2011). German Naval Guns 1939–1945. Annapolis, Maryland: Naval Institute Press. ISBN 978-1-59114-311-6.
- Williams, Tony G. (2000). Rapid Fire: The Development of Automatic Cannon, Heavy Machine Guns and Their Ammunition for Armies, Navies and Air Forces. Shrewsbury, UK: Airlife Publishing. ISBN 1-84037-122-6.
