= HMS Mauritius (80) =

Fiji-class cruiser

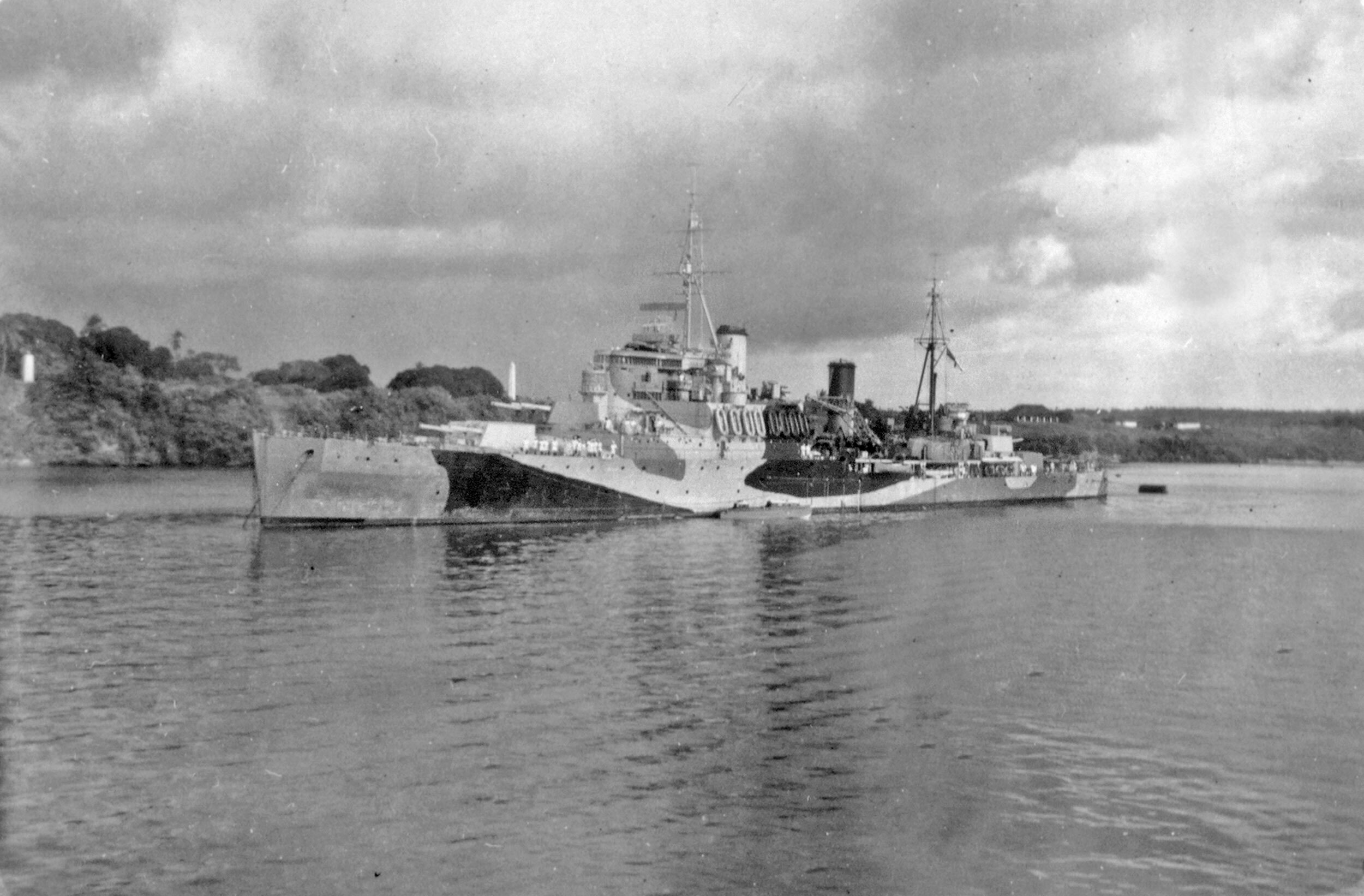

History

United Kingdom
- Name: Mauritius
- Namesake: Colony of Mauritius
- Ordered: 20 December 1937
- Builder: Swan Hunter, Tyne and Wear, United Kingdom
- Laid down: 31 March 1938
- Launched: 19 July 1939
- Commissioned: 4 January 1940
- Fate: Scrapped, 27 March 1965

General characteristics (as built)
- Class & type: Fiji-class light cruiser
- Displacement: 8,642 long tons (8,781 t) (standard)
- Length: 555 ft 6 in (169.3 m)
- Beam: 62 ft (18.9 m)
- Draught: 19 ft 10 in (6 m)
- Installed power: 4 Admiralty 3-drum boilers; 80,000 shp (60,000 kW)
- Propulsion: 4 shafts; 4 geared steam turbine sets
- Speed: 32.25 knots (59.73 km/h; 37.11 mph)
- Range: 6,250 nmi (11,580 km; 7,190 mi) at 13 knots (24 km/h; 15 mph)
- Complement: 733 (peacetime), 900 (wartime)
- Armament: 4 × triple 6 in (152 mm) guns; 4 × twin 4 in (102 mm) DP guns; 2 × quadruple 2-pdr (40 mm (1.6 in)) AA guns; 2 × quadruple 0.5 in (12.7 mm) AA machine guns; 2 × triple 21 in (533 mm) torpedo tubes
- Armour: Engine and boiler rooms: 3.25 in (83 mm); Decks: 2–3.5 in (51–89 mm); Magazines: 2–3.5 in (51–89 mm); Gun turrets: 1–2 in (25–51 mm)
- Aircraft carried: 2 × seaplanes
- Aviation facilities: 1 × catapult, 2 × hangars

HMS Mauritius, pennant C80, was a Fiji-class light cruiser of the Royal Navy. The ship was built by Swan Hunter, Newcastle upon Tyne. She was named after Mauritius, which was a British colony when she was built and entered service in 1941.

== Service ==
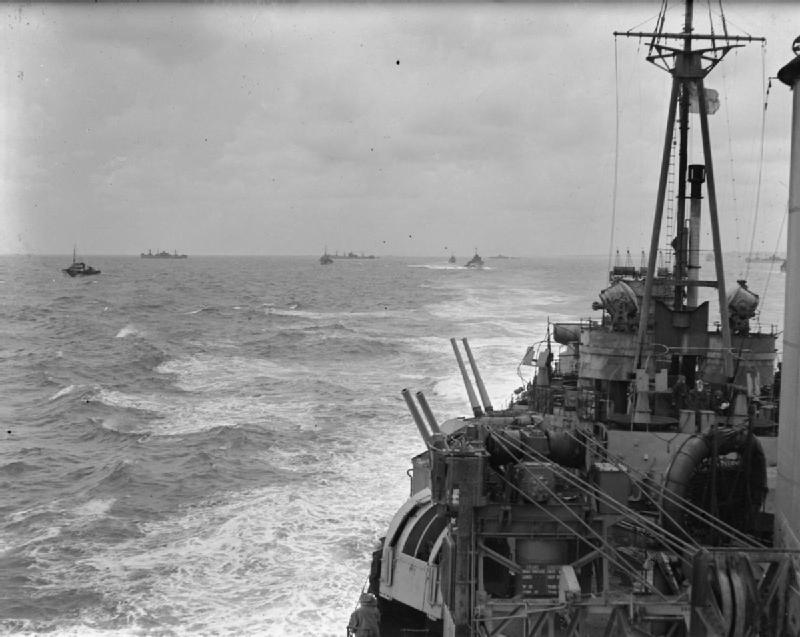
Mauritius with other Allied shipping off the beachhead at Anzio, March 1944

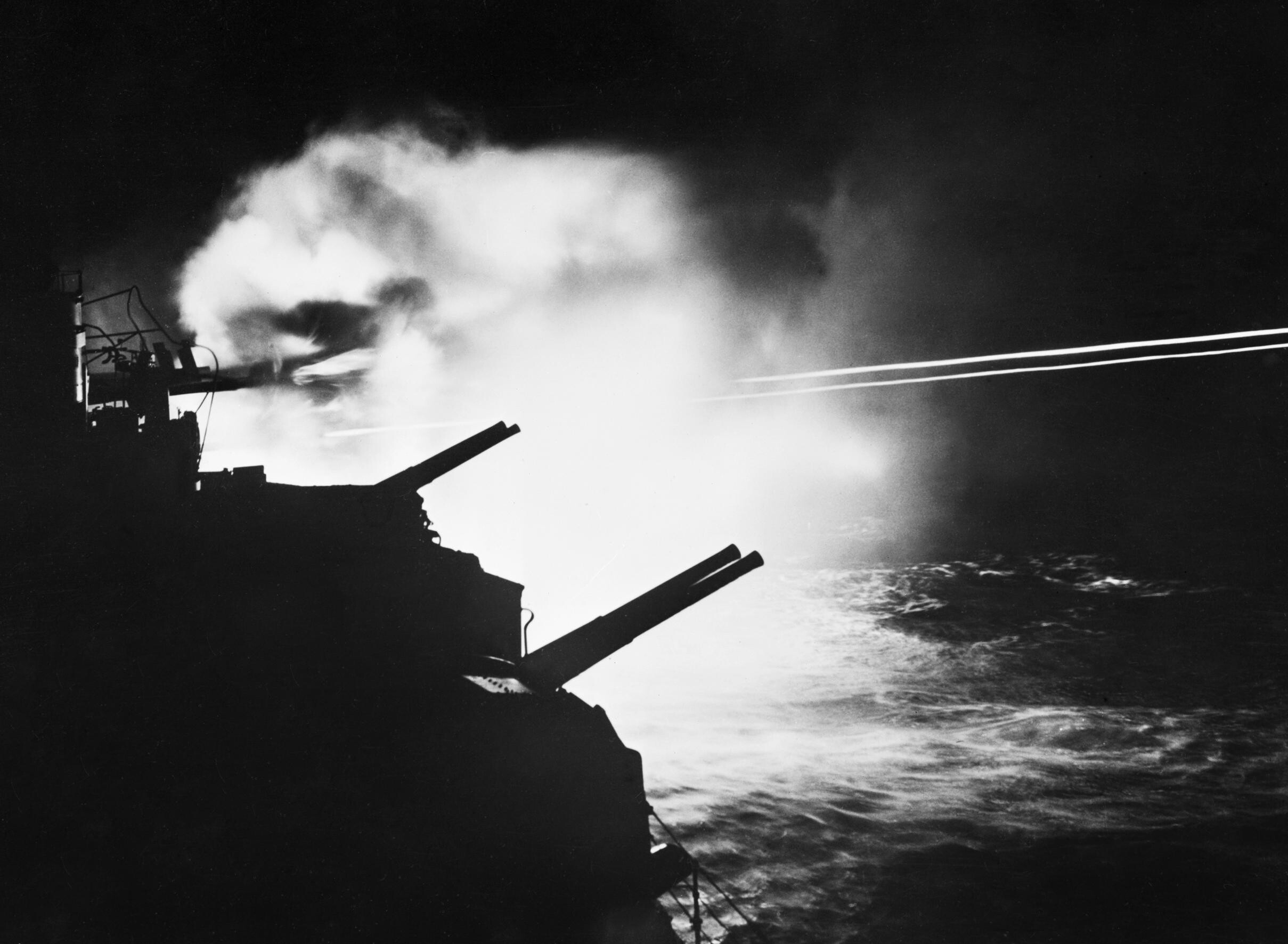
The 6-inch guns of Mauritius firing during a night action in Audierne Bay between Brest and Lorient, France, 23 August 1944.

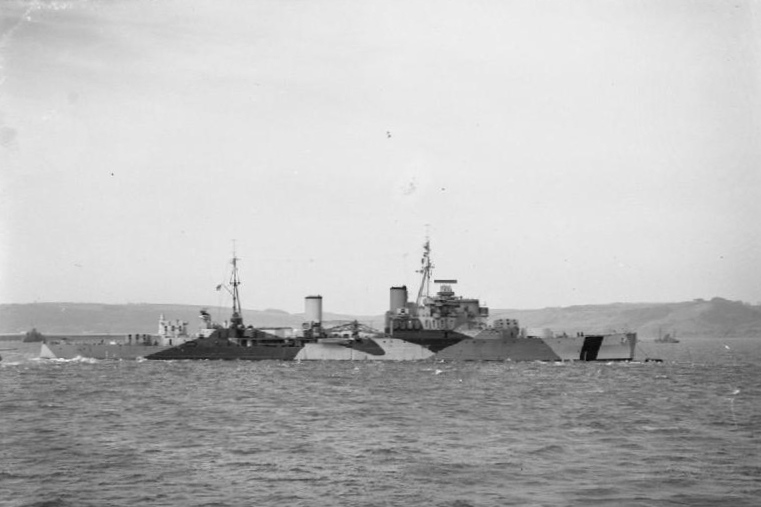
Mauritius in April 1942

Mauritius was completed with an internal degaussing system which induced severe corrosion to the ship's fire main (made of copper); this major defect, which rendered her unfit for action, required refits, first at Simonstown, later at Singapore, and finally at Plymouth. The future Admiral of the Fleet Henry Leach served as a midshipman aboard Mauritius during this time. She joined the Eastern Fleet in 1942, but was withdrawn in April 1943 to reinforce the Mediterranean Fleet. After repairs following grounding, she was operational in June 1943 and thereafter participated in the landings in Sicily, (Operation Husky), in July as a unit of Support Force East, when she carried out shore bombardment duties.

In September she was part of the covering force for the Salerno landings, but by the end of the year had been transferred to the Bay of Biscay to carry out anti-blockade-runner patrols, as part of Operation Stonewall. However, she soon returned to the Mediterranean, this time for Operation Shingle, the Anzio landings, in January 1944. In June 1944 she covered the landings in Normandy as part of Force D off Sword Beach, then carried out offensive patrols of the Brittany coast in August to mop up the remnants of the German shipping in the area. Operating with destroyers, she sank Sperrbrecher 157 on 14/15 August and during the Battle of Audierne Bay sank five Vorpostenboote on 22/23 August. After this she returned to the Home Fleet, covering the carrier raids along the Norwegian coast and making anti-shipping strikes. On the night of 27/28 January 1945, in company with the cruiser Diadem, she fought the action of 28 January 1945 with German destroyers in which Z31 was badly damaged. Following this action she was refitted at Cammell Laird's between February 1945 and March 1946.

She then served in the Mediterranean, including passing through the Corfu Channel during the Corfu Channel Incident in 1946, with the 15th (later lst) Cruiser Squadron, returning to the UK in 1948. After a spell in reserve and in refit, she recommissioned in 1949 for the 1st Cruiser Squadron in the Mediterranean, sailing on 6 May 1949. The years 1949 to 1951 were spent on the East Indies Station with the 4th Cruiser Squadron until she returned to Chatham on 18 December 1951.

== Decommissioning and disposal ==
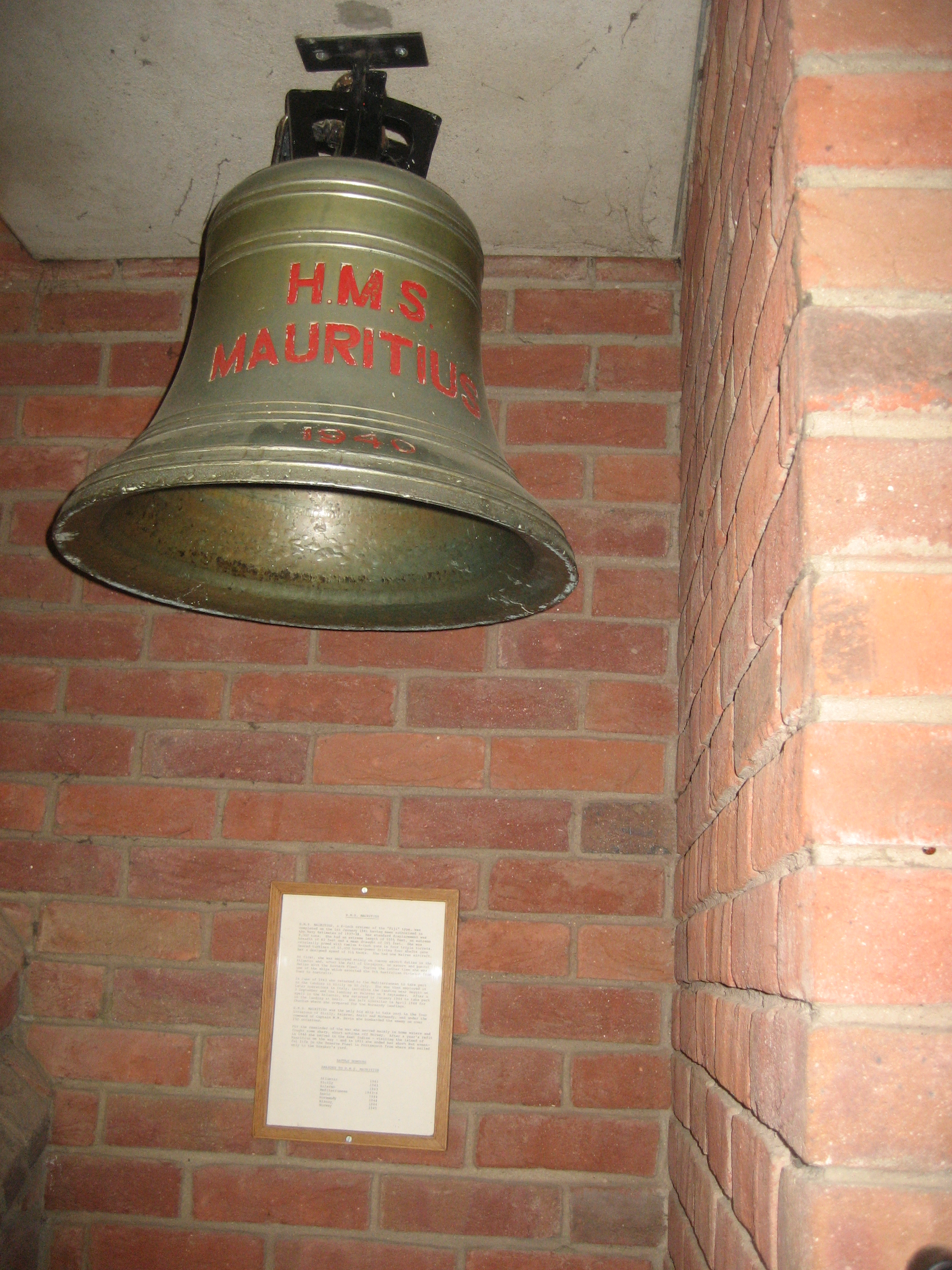
Ship's bell in Robinson College, Cambridge

Mauritius was placed in reserve in 1952 and remained there until 1965, when she was sold for scrapping to Thos. W. Ward. She arrived at their yard at Inverkeithing, on 27 March 1965.

== Shore establishment ==
HMS Mauritius was also the name of a Royal Navy shore establishment in Mauritius.
