= German destroyer Z33 =

Destroyer

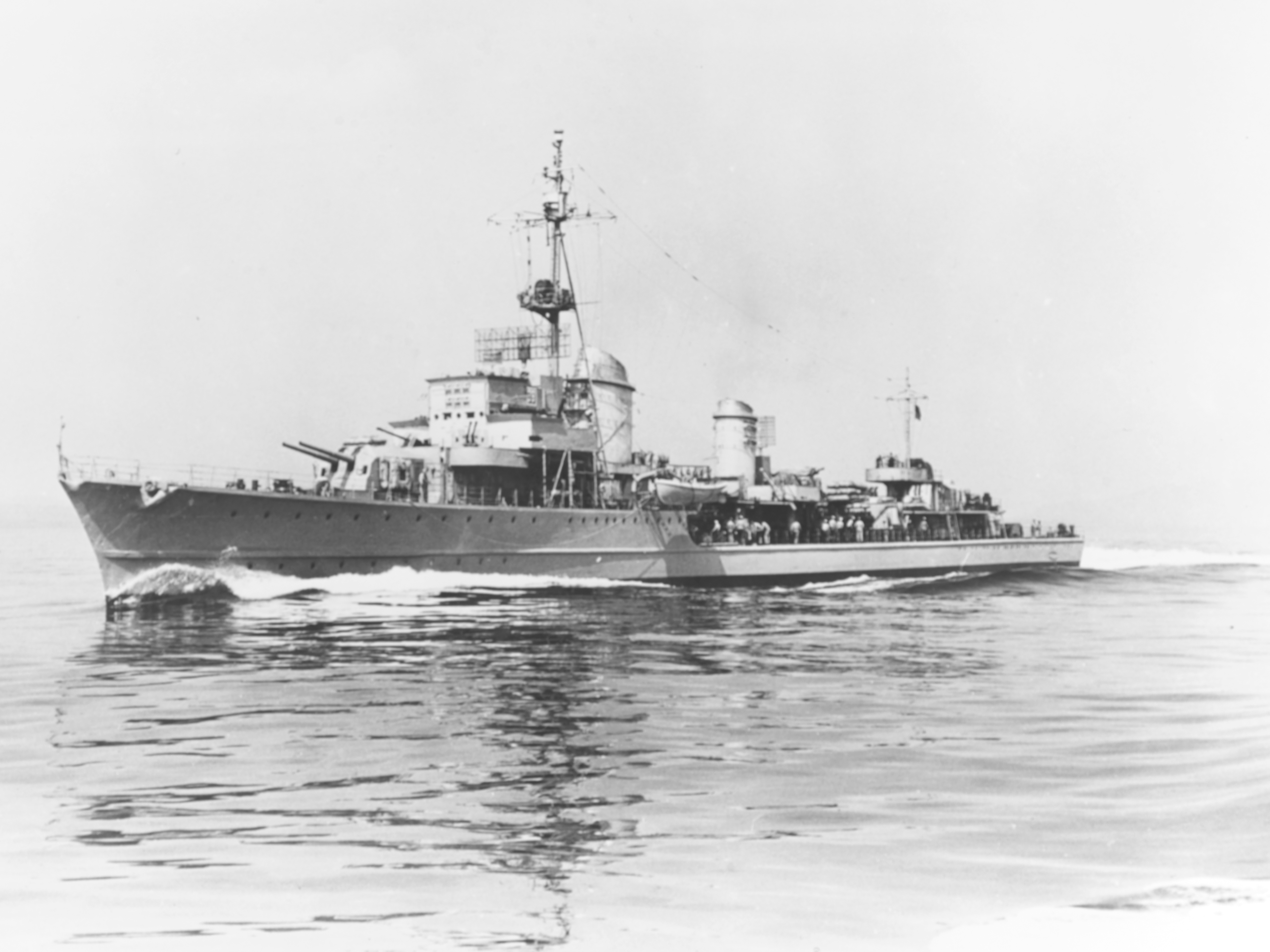
- Sister ship Z39 underway after the war

History

Nazi Germany
- Name: Z33
- Ordered: 19 September 1939
- Builder: AG Weser (Deschimag), Bremen
- Yard number: W1003
- Laid down: 22 December 1940
- Launched: 15 September 1941
- Commissioned: 6 February 1943
- Decommissioned: Late April 1945
- Out of service: early April 1945
- Captured: 9 May 1945
- Fate: Transferred to the Soviet Union, 2 January 1946

Soviet Union
- Name: Provornyy (Проворный)
- Namesake: Russian word for "nimble"
- Acquired: 2 January 1946
- Commissioned: 1946
- Decommissioned: 22 April 1955
- Reclassified: As a training ship, 30 November 1954; As an Accommodation ship, 22 April 1955
- Fate: Scrapped, 1962

General characteristics (as built)
- Class & type: Type 1936A (Mob) destroyer
- Displacement: 2,657 long tons (2,700 t) (standard); 3,691 long tons (3,750 t) (deep load)
- Length: 127 m (416 ft 8 in) (o/a)
- Beam: 12 m (39 ft 4 in)
- Draft: 4.62 m (15 ft 2 in)
- Installed power: 70,000 PS (51,000 kW; 69,000 shp); 6 × water-tube boilers
- Propulsion: 2 × shafts; 2 × geared steam turbine sets
- Speed: 36 knots (67 km/h; 41 mph)
- Range: 2,950 nmi (5,460 km; 3,390 mi) at 19 knots (35 km/h; 22 mph)
- Complement: 316–336
- Armament: 1 × twin, 3 × single 15 cm (5.9 in) guns; 2 × twin 3.7 cm (1.5 in) AA guns; 2 × quadruple and 2 × single 2 cm (0.8 in) AA guns; 2 × quadruple 53.3 cm (21 in) torpedo tubes; 60 mines; 4 × depth charge launchers

Z33 was a Type 1936A (Mob) destroyer built for the Kriegsmarine (German Navy) during World War II. Completed in 1943, the ship was damaged during the raid on the island of Spitsbergen in September and spent all of 1944 in Norwegian waters. She was damaged by British aircraft attacking the battleship Tirpitz in July. Z33 escorted troop convoys from northern Norway when the Germans began evacuating the area beginning in October. She ran aground in early 1945 as she was sailing for the Baltic and was badly damaged. While the ship was being towed to port for repairs, she and her escorts were attacked by Allied fighter-bombers. Z33 finally reached the Baltic in early April, but was reduced to reserve for lack of fuel. The ship was transferred to Cuxhaven and decommissioned shortly before the end of the war.

Z33 was allocated to the Soviet Union in late 1945 and turned over at the beginning of 1946. Renamed Provornyy, the ship subsequently served with the Soviet Navy. She became a training ship in 1954 before she was converted to an accommodation ship the following year. Provornyy was badly damaged by a fire in 1960 and was scrapped in 1962.

== Design and description ==
The Type 1936A (Mob) destroyers were slightly larger than the preceding Type 1936A class and had a heavier armament. The class had an overall length of 127 meters (416 ft 8 in) and were 121.9 meters (399 ft 11 in) long at the waterline. The ships had a beam of 12 meters (39 ft 4 in) and a maximum draft of 4.62 meters (15 ft 2 in). They displaced 2,657 long tons (2,700 t) at standard load and 3,691 long tons (3,750 t) at deep load. The two Wagner geared steam turbine sets, each driving one propeller shaft, were designed to produce 70,000 metric horsepower (51,000 kW; 69,000 shp) using steam provided by six Wagner water-tube boilers. The ships had a design speed of 36 knots (67 km/h; 41 mph), and their maximum speed was 36.1 knots (66.9 km/h; 41.5 mph). The Type 1936A (Mob) destroyers carried enough fuel oil to give a range of 2,239 nautical miles (4,147 km; 2,577 mi) at a speed of 19 knots (35 km/h; 22 mph). The crew of the ships numbered 11–15 officers and 305–21 enlisted men, plus an additional 4 officers and 19 enlisted men if serving as a flotilla flagship.

The Type 1936A (Mob) ships were armed with five 15-centimeter (5.9 in) TbtsK C/36 guns in a twin-gun turret forward and three single mounts with gun shields aft of the main superstructure. Their anti-aircraft armament varied and Z33's consisted of four 3.7-centimeter (1.5 in) Flak M42 guns in a pair of twin mounts abreast the rear funnel and ten 2-centimeter (0.79 in) C/38 guns in two quadruple and two single mounts. The ships carried eight 53.3-centimeter (21 in) torpedo tubes in two power-operated mounts. A pair of reload torpedoes was provided for each mount. They had four depth charge launchers and mine rails could be fitted on the rear deck that had a maximum capacity of 60 mines. A system of passive hydrophones designated as 'GHG' (Gruppenhorchgerät) was fitted to detect submarines. A S-Gerät sonar was also probably fitted. The ship was equipped with a FuMO 24/25 radar set above the bridge as well as FuMB 3 Bali, FuMB 6 Palau, FuMB 26 Tunis, and FuMB 31 radar detectors.

=== Modifications ===
A FuMB 4 Sumatra radar detector was added after completion and a FuMO 63 Hohentwiel radar was installed in 1944–1945 in lieu of the aft searchlight. In early April 1945, one 15 cm gun was transferred to her sister Z34 to replace a damaged weapon. About that same time her anti-aircraft guns were removed. When the destroyer was ordered to the German Bight later that month, they were replaced by weapons taken from the wreck of the heavy cruiser Lützow. By the end of the war, Z33's anti-aircraft suite consisted of ten 3.7 cm guns in five twin mounts and a dozen 2 cm guns in one quadruple, two twin and four single mounts.

== Service history ==
Z33 was first ordered from Seebeckwerft (yard number 665) as a Type 1938B destroyer on 28 June 1939, but the Kriegsmarine cancelled the order in September 1939, re-ordering the ship from AG Weser (Deschimag) (yard number W1003) as a Type 1936A (Mob) destroyer on 19 September 1939. The ship was laid down at Deschimag's Bremen shipyard on 22 December 1940 and launched on 15 September 1941. Construction was slowed by shortage of manpower and materials and Z33 was not commissioned until 6 February 1943.

The ship sailed to Norway shortly after she finished working up on 22 July. She took part in Operation Zitronella, the German raid on the island of Spitsbergen in September where she was hit by coastal artillery 33 times, killing 3 crewmen and wounding 25. Z33 was one of the escorts for the battleship Scharnhorst during Operation Ostfront on 25 December, an attempt to intercept the British Convoy JW 55B that was bound for the Soviet Union. All of the battleship's escorts were detached the following day to increase the likelihood of intercepting the convoy and did not participate in the ensuing Battle of North Cape. She remained in Norwegian waters through 1944. On 17 July 1944 Z33 was strafed by Vought F4U Corsair fighters of the Royal Navy's Fleet Air Arm during Operation Mascot, an attack on the battleship Tirpitz, but only suffered superficial damage. Beginning in October, the ship escorted convoys during Operation Nordlicht, the evacuation of northern Norway. On 27 December Z33 laid a minefield off Honningsvaag together with her sister Z31. The two ships laid another minefield off Hammerfest on 3 January 1945.

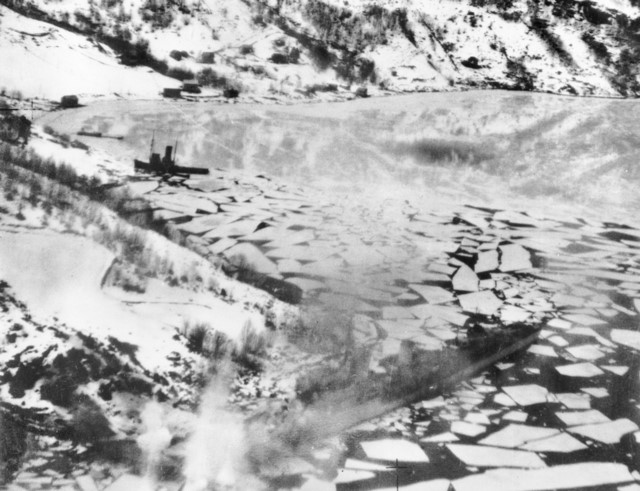
Z33 under attack by Allied aircraft on 9 February 1945

Z33 departed for Germany on 5 February, but ran aground in Brufjord two days later. The impact severely damaged her port propeller shaft and its propeller, knocked out both turbines, and caused flooding. While under tow to Trondheim she was attacked by Allied Bristol Beaufighter fighter-bombers two days later while anchored in Førde Fjord. The destroyer was further damaged during the attack, but she and her escorts shot down seven Beaufighters, which later became known by the squadrons involved as the "Black Friday" airstrike for the heavy casualties that they suffered. Once repairs were completed she sailed for Swinemünde on 26 March and arrived there on 2 April. Due to Germany's shortage of fuel the ship was laid up and saw no further combat. All of her anti-aircraft guns were removed shortly after her arrival. Before Z33 departed Swinemünde on 27 April to be decommissioned at Cuxhaven, her anti-aircraft weapons were replaced by guns taken from the wreck of Lützow.

After the war Z33 sailed to Wilhelmshaven and was overhauled to keep her seaworthy while the Allies decided how to divide the surviving ships of the Kriegsmarine amongst themselves as war reparations. The ship was allotted to the Soviet Union in late 1945 and turned over on 2 January 1946 before departing for Liepāja, Latvia. She was renamed Provornyy (Проворный, “Nimble”) and assigned to the Red Banner Baltic Fleet. She briefly became a training ship on 30 November 1954 before was reclassified as an accommodation ship on 22 April 1955. During 1960, Provornyy was badly damaged by a fire and sank at her moorings. She was refloated two years later and then scrapped.
