= German destroyer Z31 =

Destroyer

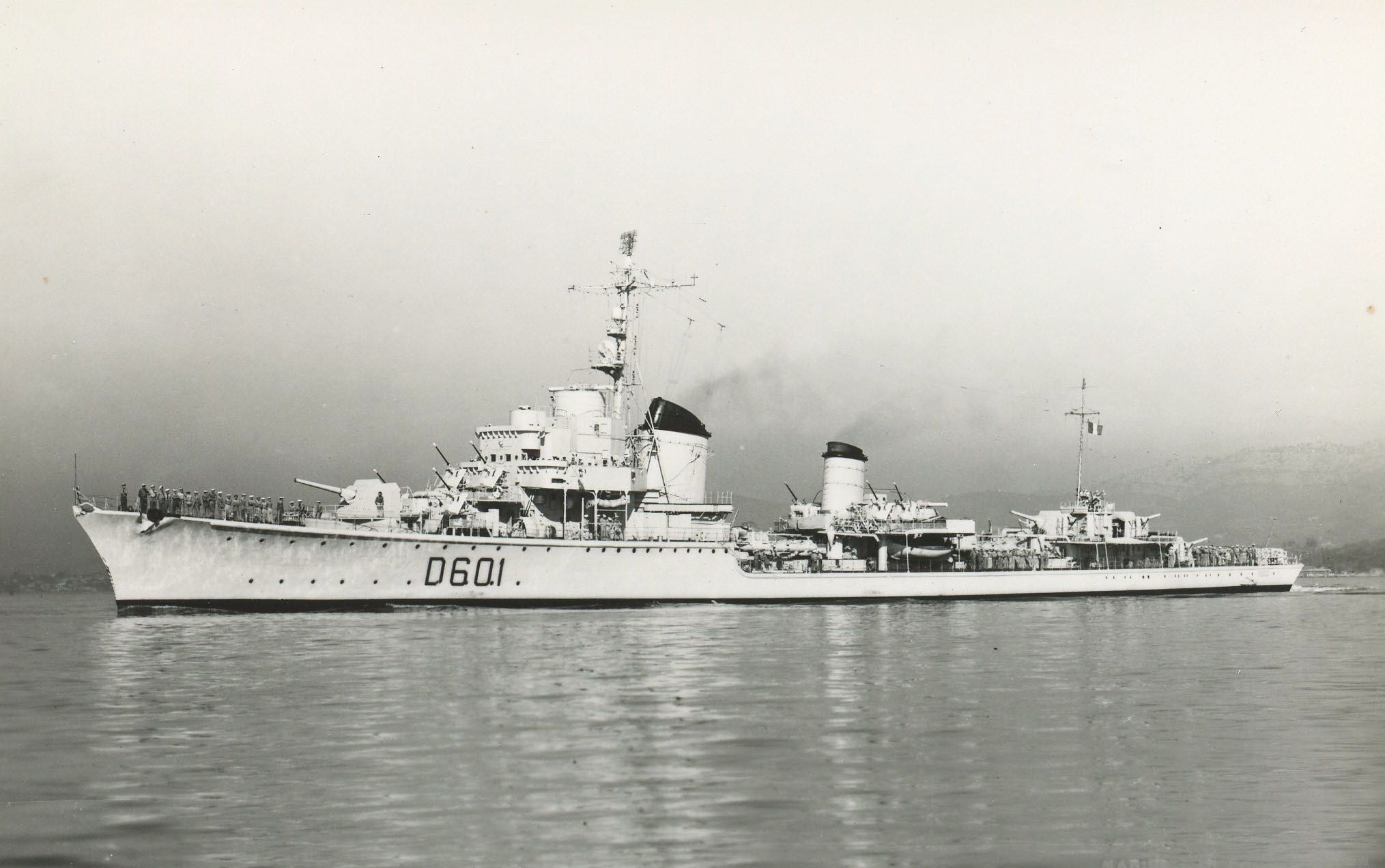
- Z31 underway while under French control

History

Nazi Germany
- Name: Z31
- Ordered: 19 September 1939
- Builder: AG Weser (Deschimag), Bremen
- Laid down: 1 September 1940
- Launched: 15 May 1941
- Commissioned: 11 April 1942
- Fate: War reparation to France

France
- Name: Marceau
- Acquired: 2 February 1946
- Commissioned: 1 April 1946
- Stricken: 2 January 1958
- Fate: Scrapped early 1960s

General characteristics (as built)
- Class & type: Type 1936A (Mob) destroyer
- Displacement: 2,603 long tons (2,645 t) (standard); 3,597 long tons (3,655 t) (deep load)
- Length: 127 m (416 ft 8 in) (o/a)
- Beam: 12 m (39 ft 4 in)
- Draft: 4.62 m (15 ft 2 in)
- Installed power: 6 × water-tube boilers; 70,000 PS (51,000 kW; 69,000 shp)
- Propulsion: 2 × shafts; 2 × geared steam turbine sets
- Speed: 36 knots (67 km/h; 41 mph)
- Range: 2,950 nmi (5,460 km; 3,390 mi) at 19 knots (35 km/h; 22 mph)
- Complement: 332
- Armament: 4 × single 15 cm (5.9 in) guns; 2 × twin 3.7 cm (1.5 in) anti-aircraft guns; 1 × quadruple and 5 × single 2 cm (0.8 in) AA guns; 2 × quadruple 53.3 cm (21 in) torpedo tubes; 60 mines

Z31 was a German Type 1936A (Mob) destroyer, which was completed in 1942 and served with the Kriegsmarine during the Second World War. She was constructed in Germany as part of Plan Z, and commissioned 11 April 1942. She spent much of the war in Arctic and Norwegian waters, taking part in the Battle of the Barents Sea on 31 December 1942. She survived the war, and was passed on to the French Navy as a war prize, serving under the name Marceau until 1958.

== Design and construction ==
On 28 June 1939, orders for nine destroyers (Z31–Z39) of the new Type 1938B class were placed by Germany, with a further three destroyers of the class being ordered in July. They were ordered as a part of Plan Z, which was a German naval rearmament plan, involving building ten battleships, four aircraft carriers, twelve battlecruisers, three pocket battleships, five heavy cruisers, forty-four light cruisers, sixty-eight destroyers, and 249 submarines. These ships were to be split into two battle fleets: a "Home Fleet", to tie down the British war fleet in the North Sea, and a "Raiding Fleet", to wage war upon British convoys. The Type 1938B were relatively small destroyers compared with the preceding Type 1936 and 1936A ships, to be armed with four 127mm (5 in) guns in two twin turrets, and designed for long range. Following the outbreak of the Second World War, however, orders for the Type 1938B destroyers were cancelled, with a reversion to a slightly modified version of the previous Type 1936A class, the Type 1936A (Mob) class. On 19 September 1939, four destroyers (Z31–Z34) were re-ordered from the Deschimag consortium to be built at the AG Weser shipyard in Bremen on that day, with a further three ships (Z37–Z39) ordered from the Germaniawerft yard. Z31 was laid down on 1 September 1940 (with the yard number 1001), launched on 15 May 1941 and commissioned on 11 April 1942.

Z31 was 127 metres (416 ft 8 in) long overall and 121.9 metres (399 ft 11 in) at the waterline, with a beam of 12 metres (39 ft 4 in) and a draught of 3.92–4.62 metres (12 ft 10 in – 15 ft 2 in) depending on displacement. Displacement was 2,645 tonnes (2,603 long tons) standard and 3,655 tonnes (3,597 long tons) full load. The ship's machinery consisted of six Wagner boilers feeding high-pressure superheated steam (at 70 atm (1,029 psi; 7,093 kPa) and 450 °C (842 °F)) to two sets of Wagner geared steam turbines. The ship's rated power was 70,000 shaft horsepower (52,000 kW), giving a speed of 38.5 knots (71.3 km/h; 44.3 mph), while its range was 2,239 nautical miles (4,147 km; 2,577 mi) at 19 knots (35 km/h; 22 mph). The ship had a complement of 321 officers and ratings.

The design main armament for the Type 1936A (Mob) class was, like the Type 1936A class on which it was based, five 15 cm (5.9in) TbtsK C/36 naval guns, with one twin turret forward and three single mounts aft. Development of the twin turret was slow however, and Z31 (like all the Type 1936A class), was completed with an additional single 15 cm gun replacing the unavailable twin turret, giving a total of four 15 cm guns. The forward gun was replaced by the intended twin turret in 1944, but the twin turret was replaced by a single 10.5 cm (4.1in) SK L/45 naval gun after the twin turret was wrecked in battle in January 1945. The ship's anti-aircraft armament consisted of two twin 3.7 cm SK C/30 anti-aircraft guns (later replaced by automatic Flak M42 guns) and nine 2 cm cannon in one quadruple and five single mounts. A second quadruple 20 mm mount was fitted forward of the ship's bridge in 1943, replacing one of the single mounts, while additional 3.7 cm guns were fitted in 1945, giving a final anti-aircraft armament in German service of fourteen 3.7 cm and twelve 2 cm guns. Eight 53.3 cm (21 in) torpedo tubes in two quadruple mounts were fitted, and up to 60 mines could be carried.

== German service ==
After commissioning, the ship underwent a lengthy work up process, which was common for German destroyers during the Second World War. Following Z31 being damaged in a collision with a schooner on 6 November 1941, she was transferred to an operational flotilla in Norwegian waters in December 1942. On 30 December 1942, Z31 left the Altafjord in northern Norway along with the heavy cruisers Admiral Hipper and Lützow and the destroyers Friedrich Eckoldt, Richard Beitzen, Theodor Riedel, Z29 and Z30 on Operation Regenbogen, an attempt to attack the Arctic convoy JW 51B. The German force encountered the convoy on the morning of 31 December, and in poor visibility, engaged the convoy's escort in the Battle of the Barents Sea. Hipper sank the British destroyer Achates and the minesweeper Bramble and damaged the destroyers Onslow and Obdurate, while Lützow damaged the destroyer Obedient, but broke off the engagement after the British cruiser covering force of Sheffield and Jamaica damaged Hipper and sank Richard Beitzen. None of the 15 merchant ships in the convoy were damaged.

On 5–6 February 1943, Z31, Theodor Riedel and the minelayer Brummer laid a minefield off Kildin Island, while on 10–11 March the two destroyers escorted Lützow from Kaafjord to Narvik. On 6 September 1943, Z31 set out from the Altafjord as part of a fleet consisting of the battleships Tirpitz and Scharnhorst and nine destroyers on Operation Zitronella, a raid on Allied-controlled Spitzbergen. Z31 was hit eight times by shells from coastal artillery off Barentsburg on 8 September, with one man killed and a second wounded. In November, Z31 transferred to southern Norway, where she carried out patrol operations before laying defensive minefields in the entrance to the Skagerrak from 4–7 December.

After that operation, Z31 began a refit at Wesermünde, which continued until August 1944, when she returned to Norway. She was damaged by strafing from British carrier-based fighters during an attack on Tirpitz in the Altafjord on 29 August. In October 1944, Z31 took part in escort operations as the Germans evacuated the 20th Mountain Army from northern Finland and Norway in response to the Soviet Petsamo–Kirkenes Offensive. The destroyer continued escort and patrol duties for the rest of the year, together with minelaying operations off Honningsvåg (with Z29 on 16 December and with Z33 on 27 December) and off Hammerfest (again with Z33) on 3 January 1945.

On 25 January 1945, the German 4th Destroyer Flotilla, consisting of Z31, Z34 and Z38 set out from Tromsø for the Baltic. On 28 January, the three destroyers were intercepted by the British cruisers Mauritius and Diadem in the Sognefjorden, north of Bergen. Z31 was hit seven times by the British ships, with her forward turret being wrecked and 55 men killed and a further 24 wounded. Z34 was also damaged. After escaping, Z31 put into Bergen for temporary repairs, with further work being carried out at Horten and Oslo before the ship reached the Baltic.

From 22 March, Z31, working with Z34 and Lützow, shelled advancing Soviet troops near Gotenhafen in West Prussia (now Gdynia in Poland), while on 23 March she towed the hulk of the battleship Gneisenau to the entrance of Gotenhafen harbour, ready to be sunk as a blockship. (Gneisenau was scuttled on 27 March). On 27 March, a 15 cm shell accidentally exploded in one of Z31's guns, killing four and wounding 18. Nevertheless, Z31 continued to support evacuation of German troops and civilians from Gotenhafen and Hela, until the ship was damaged by Soviet bombs, and withdrew westwards with Prinz Eugen and Lützow on 8 April. Z31 was docked at Swinemünde (now Świnoujście) for repair on 10 April, and was damaged again by Soviet air attack when on passage to Kiel on 27 April. She reached Brunsbüttel on 30 April, and remained there until the end of the war on 8 May.

== French service ==
Following the end of the war, Z31 was transferred to Great Britain. She was to be given to France as part of Germany's war reparations, thus, following testing in August 1945, she was passed on to France, being transferred to the French Navy at Cherbourg on 2 February 1946, and commissioned as Marceau on 1 April. From 1948 to 1950, Marceau underwent a major refit, in which the forward 10.5 cm gun was replaced by a 15.0 cm gun, the ship's anti-aircraft outfit changed to eight Bofors 40 mm guns and US radar was fitted. She was stationed in Toulon, and served out of it for several years. She visited Oran, Dakar and Bizerte regularly during exercises with the French fleet. She went into reserve in 1953, and on 1 February 1954 was laid up as a hulk (Q103). She was stricken on 2 January 1958 and sold for scrap later that year, being broken up in the early 1960s.

== Bibliography ==
- Gröner, Erich (1983). Die deutschen Kriegsschiffe 1815–1945: Band 2: Torpedoboote, Zerstörer, Schnelleboote, Minensuchboote, Minenräumboote [German Warships of 1815–1945: Volume 2: Torpedo Boats, Destroyers, Speedboats, and Minesweepers] (in German). Koblenz, Germany: Bernard & Graefe Verlag. ISBN 3-7637-4801-6.
- Jordan, John (1995). "France". In Chumbley, Stephen (ed.). Conway's All The World's Fighting Ships 1947–1995. Annapolis, Maryland: Naval Institute Press. pp. 95–131. ISBN 1-55750-132-7.
- Koop, Gerhard & Schmolke, Klaus-Peter (2014). German Destroyers of World War II. Barnsley, UK: Seaforth Publishing. ISBN 978-1-84832-193-9.
- Lenton, H. T. (1975). German Warships of the Second World War. London: Macdonald and Jane's. ISBN 0356-04661-3.
- Miller, Nathan (1997). War at Sea: A Naval History of World War II. New York: Oxford University Press. ISBN 978-0-19511038-8.
- Rohwer, Jürgen & Hümmelchen, Gerhard (1992). Chronology of the War at Sea 1939–1945. London: Greenhill Books. ISBN 1-85367-117-7.
- Ruegg, Bob & Hague, Arnold (1993). Convoys to Russia 1941–1945. Kendal, UK: World Ship Society. ISBN 0-905617-66-5.
- Sieche, Erwin (1980). "Germany". In Chesneau, Roger (ed.). Conway's All the World's Fighting Ships 1922–1946. London: Conway Maritime Press. pp. 218–254. ISBN 0-85177-146-7.
- Whitley, M. J. (2000). Destroyers of World War Two: An International Encyclopedia. London: Cassell & Co. ISBN 1-85409-521-8.
