= German submarine U-249 =

German World War II submarine

Coordinates: 56°10′N 10°05′W

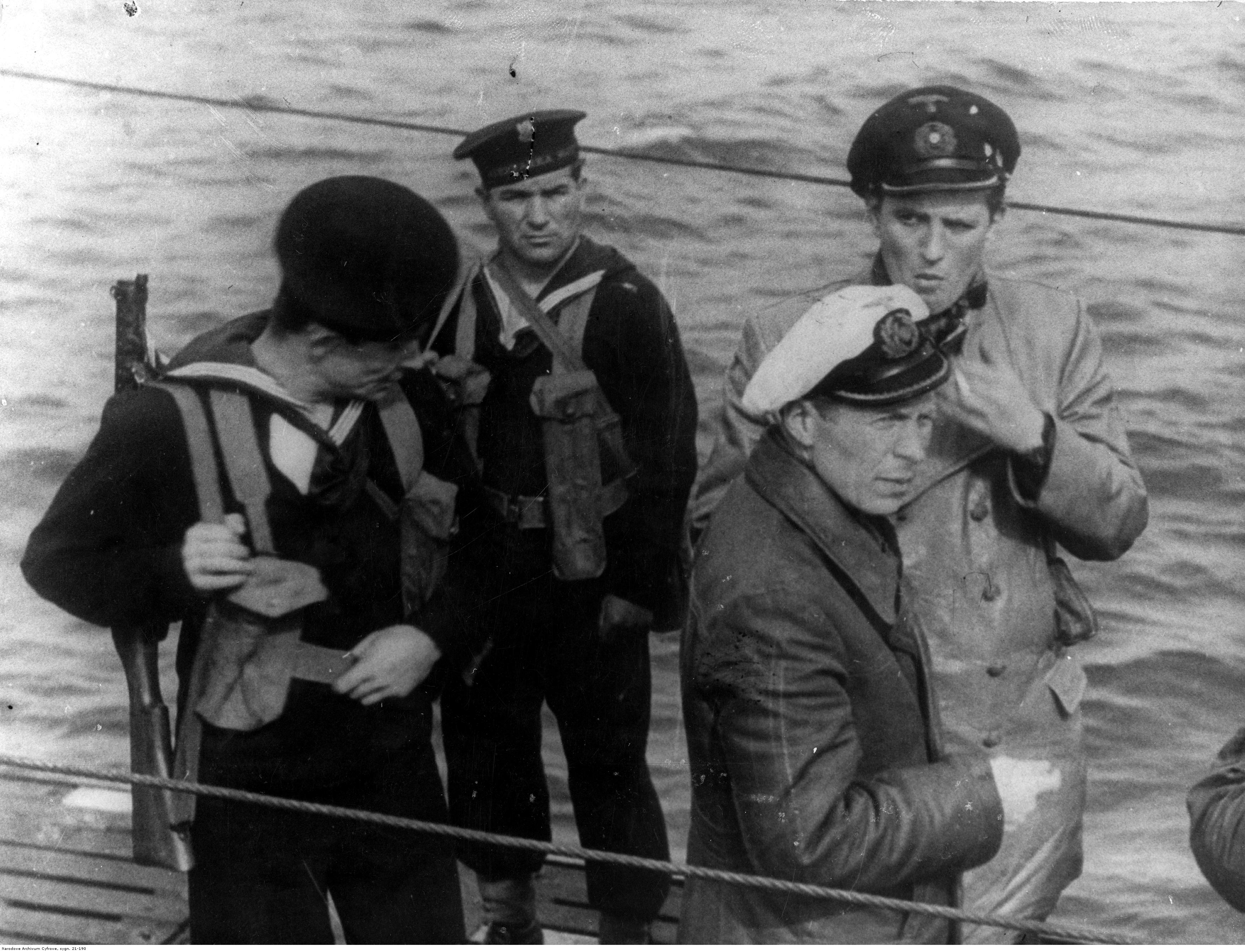
- U-249 after the surrender of Nazi Germany

History

Nazi Germany
- Name: U-249
- Ordered: 5 June 1941
- Builder: Germaniawerft, Kiel
- Yard number: 683
- Laid down: 23 January 1943
- Launched: 23 October 1943
- Commissioned: 20 November 1943
- Fate: Surrendered on 10 May 1945; Scuttled on 13 December 1945 during Operation Deadlight

General characteristics
- Class & type: Type VIIC submarine
- Displacement: 769 tonnes (757 long tons) surfaced; 871 t (857 long tons) submerged
- Length: 67.23 m (220 ft 7 in) o/a; 50.50 m (165 ft 8 in) pressure hull
- Beam: 6.20 m (20 ft 4 in) o/a; 4.70 m (15 ft 5 in) pressure hull
- Height: 9.60 m (31 ft 6 in)
- Draught: 4.74 m (15 ft 7 in)
- Installed power: 2,800–3,200 PS (2,100–2,400 kW; 2,800–3,200 bhp) (diesels); 750 PS (550 kW; 740 shp) (electric)
- Propulsion: 2 shafts; 2 × diesel engines; 2 × electric motors
- Speed: 17.7 knots (32.8 km/h; 20.4 mph) surfaced; 7.6 knots (14.1 km/h; 8.7 mph) submerged
- Range: 8,500 nmi (15,700 km; 9,800 mi) at 10 knots (19 km/h; 12 mph) surfaced; 80 nmi (150 km; 92 mi) at 4 knots (7.4 km/h; 4.6 mph) submerged
- Test depth: 230 m (750 ft); Crush depth: 250–295 m (820–968 ft)
- Complement: 4 officers, 40–56 enlisted
- Armament: 5 × 53.3 cm (21 in) torpedo tubes (four bow, one stern); 14 × torpedoes or 26 TMA mines; 1 × 3.7 cm (1.5 in) Flak M42 AA gun; 2 × twin 2 cm (0.79 in) C/30 anti-aircraft guns

Service record
- Part of: 5th U-boat Flotilla; 20 November 1943 – 8 May 1945
- Identification codes: M 54 401
- Commanders: Oblt.z.S.d.R Rolf Lindschau; 20 November 1943 – 16 July 1944; Oblt.z.S. Uwe Kock; 17 July 1944 – 10 May 1945
- Operations: 2 patrols: 1st patrol: a. 7 – 16 March 1945; b. 21 – 24 March 1945; 2nd patrol: 3 April – 10 May 1945
- Victories: None

German submarine U-249 was a Type VIIC U-boat of Nazi Germany's Kriegsmarine during World War II. The submarine was laid down on 23 January 1943 at the Friedrich Krupp Germaniawerft yard at Kiel as yard number 683, launched on 23 October 1943 and commissioned on 20 November under the command of Oberleutnant zur See Rolf Lindschau. In two patrols, she sank no ships.

She surrendered on 10 May 1945 and was sunk on 13 December as part of Operation Deadlight.

== Design ==
German Type VIIC submarines were preceded by the shorter Type VIIB submarines. U-249 had a displacement of 769 tonnes (757 long tons) when at the surface and 871 tonnes (857 long tons) while submerged. She had a total length of 67.10 m (220 ft 2 in), a pressure hull length of 50.50 m (165 ft 8 in), a beam of 6.20 m (20 ft 4 in), a height of 9.60 m (31 ft 6 in), and a draught of 4.74 m (15 ft 7 in). The submarine was powered by two Germaniawerft F46 four-stroke, six-cylinder supercharged diesel engines producing a total of 2,800 to 3,200 metric horsepower (2,060 to 2,350 kW; 2,760 to 3,160 shp) for use while surfaced, two AEG GU 460/8–27 double-acting electric motors producing a total of 750 metric horsepower (550 kW; 740 shp) for use while submerged. She had two shafts and two 1.23 m (4 ft) propellers. The boat was capable of operating at depths of up to 230 metres (750 ft).

The submarine had a maximum surface speed of 17.7 knots (32.8 km/h; 20.4 mph) and a maximum submerged speed of 7.6 knots (14.1 km/h; 8.7 mph). When submerged, the boat could operate for 80 nautical miles (150 km; 92 mi) at 4 knots (7.4 km/h; 4.6 mph); when surfaced, she could travel 8,500 nautical miles (15,700 km; 9,800 mi) at 10 knots (19 km/h; 12 mph). U-249 was fitted with five 53.3 cm (21 in) torpedo tubes (four fitted at the bow and one at the stern), fourteen torpedoes, one 3.7 cm (1.5 in) Flak M42 and two twin 2 cm (0.79 in) C/30 anti-aircraft guns. The boat had a complement of between forty-four and sixty.

== Armament ==
=== FLAK weaponry ===
U-249 was mounted with a single 3.7 cm Flakzwilling M43U gun on the rare LM 43U mount. The LM 43U mount was the final design of mount used on U-boats and is only known to be installed on U-boats (U-821, U-977, U-1023, U-1171, U-1305 and U-1306). The 3.7 cm Flak M42U was the marine version of the 3.7 cm Flak used by the Kriegsmarine on Type VII and Type IX U-boats. U-249 was mounted with two 2cm Flak C38 in a M 43U Zwilling mount with short folding shield on the upper Wintergarten. The M 43U mount was used on a number of U-boats (U-190, U-250, U-278, U-337, U-475, U-853, U-1058, U-1109, U-1023, U-1105, U-1165 and U-1306).

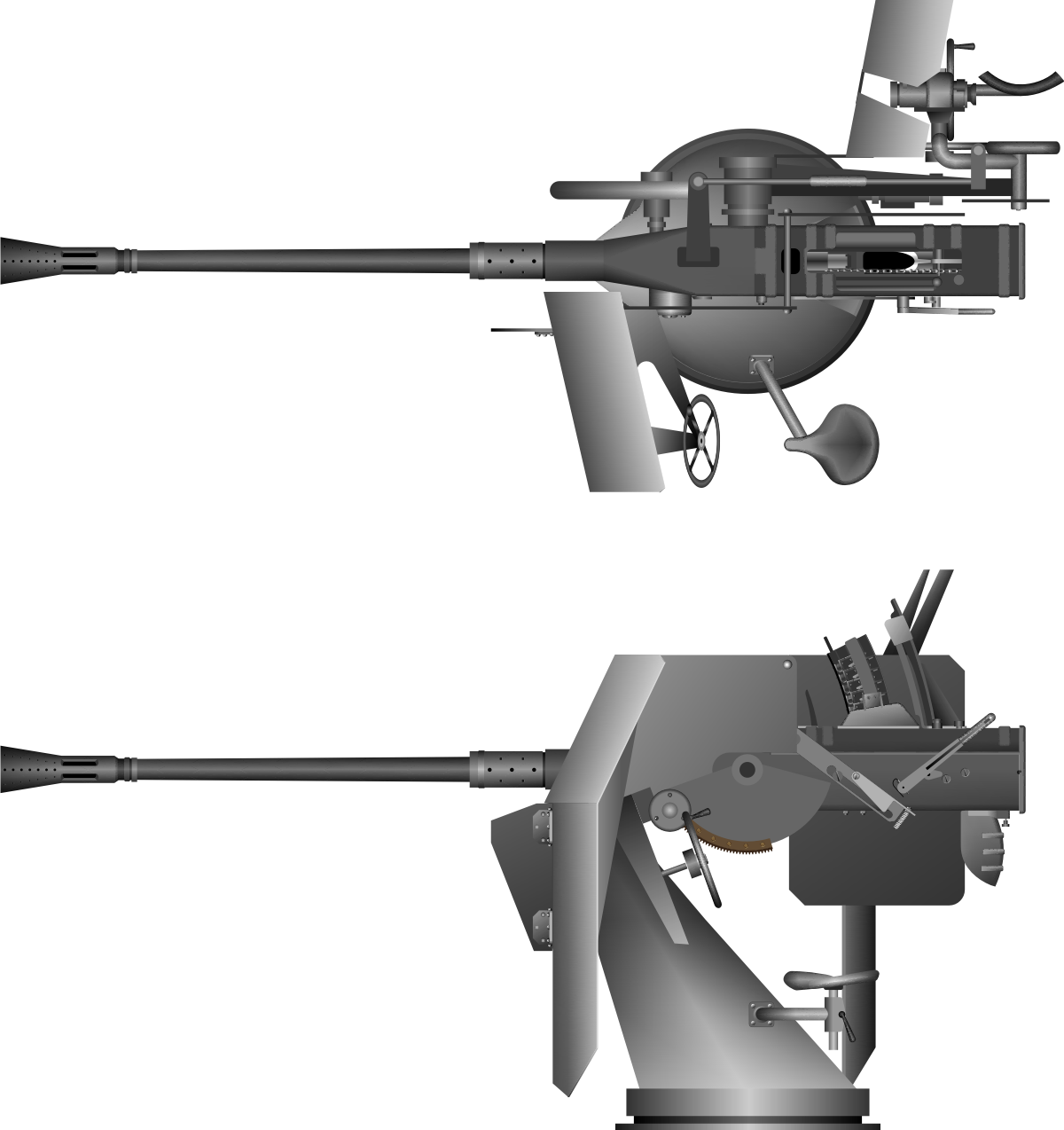
The single 3.7 cm Flak M42U gun on the LM 43U mount.

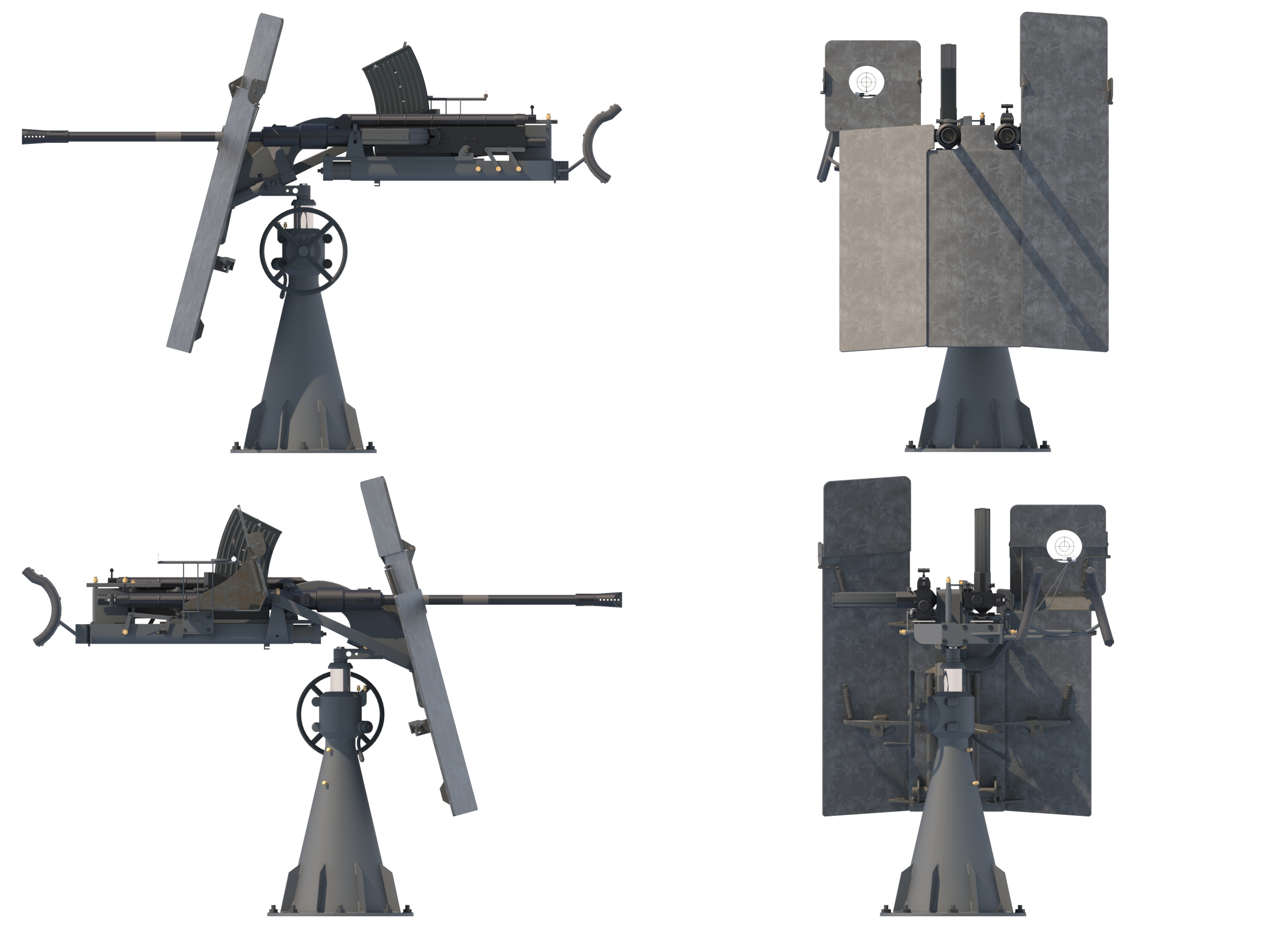
2 cm Flak C38 in a M 43U Zwilling mount with short folding shield.

== Service history ==
After training with the 5th U-boat Flotilla at Kiel, U-249 remained with that organization for front-line service from 1 January 1945.

=== First patrol ===
The boat's first patrol was preceded by a pair of short trips between Kiel in Germany, and Kristiansand and Bergen in Norway. Her first sortie proper started with her departure from Bergen on 7 March 1945. It finished in the same port on 16 March. While sailing on another non-classifiable voyage, she shot a Mosquito of No. 235 Squadron RAF down. The pilot was captured.

=== Second patrol and surrender ===
She left Bergen on 3 April 1945 and arrived at Portland, UK, flying the black flag of surrender on 10 May.

She was then briefly used by the British as the research ship N 86 before being transferred to Loch Ryan in Scotland for Operation Deadlight. She was sunk on 13 December 1945.

In May 2013 her official visitors' book, and Captain Kock's fixed-focus Zeiss binoculars, taken as spoils of war by the British officer who commanded her prize crew, were shown on the BBC television series Antiques Roadshow by the officer's son, himself a former submarine captain, who used the binoculars during his career.

== Bibliography ==
- Busch, Rainer; Röll, Hans-Joachim (1999). German U-boat commanders of World War II : a biographical dictionary. Translated by Brooks, Geoffrey. London, Annapolis, Md: Greenhill Books, Naval Institute Press. ISBN 1-55750-186-6.
- Busch, Rainer; Röll, Hans-Joachim (1999). Deutsche U-Boot-Verluste von September 1939 bis Mai 1945 [German U-boat losses from September 1939 to May 1945]. Der U-Boot-Krieg (in German). Vol. IV. Hamburg, Berlin, Bonn: Mittler. ISBN 3-8132-0514-2.
- Gröner, Erich; Jung, Dieter; Maass, Martin (1991). U-boats and Mine Warfare Vessels. German Warships 1815–1945. Vol. 2. Translated by Thomas, Keith; Magowan, Rachel. London: Conway Maritime Press. ISBN 0-85177-593-4.
