= German submarine U-475 =

German World War II submarine

History

Nazi Germany
- Name: U-475
- Ordered: 10 April 1941
- Builder: Deutsche Werke, Kiel
- Yard number: 306
- Laid down: 5 September 1942
- Launched: 28 May 1943
- Commissioned: 7 July 1943
- Fate: Scuttled on 3 May 1945. Broken up in 1947

General characteristics
- Class & type: Type VIIC submarine
- Displacement: 769 tonnes (757 long tons) surfaced; 871 t (857 long tons) submerged
- Length: 67.10 m (220 ft 2 in) o/a; 50.50 m (165 ft 8 in) pressure hull
- Beam: 6.20 m (20 ft 4 in) o/a; 4.70 m (15 ft 5 in) pressure hull
- Height: 9.60 m (31 ft 6 in)
- Draught: 4.74 m (15 ft 7 in)
- Installed power: 2,800–3,200 PS (2,100–2,400 kW; 2,800–3,200 bhp) (diesels); 750 PS (550 kW; 740 shp) (electric)
- Propulsion: 2 shafts; 2 × diesel engines; 2 × electric motors.
- Speed: 17.7 knots (32.8 km/h; 20.4 mph) surfaced; 7.6 knots (14.1 km/h; 8.7 mph) submerged
- Range: 8,500 nmi (15,700 km; 9,800 mi) at 10 knots (19 km/h; 12 mph) surfaced; 80 nmi (150 km; 92 mi) at 4 knots (7.4 km/h; 4.6 mph) submerged
- Test depth: 230 m (750 ft); Crush depth: 250–295 m (820–968 ft)
- Complement: 4 officers, 40–56 enlisted
- Armament: 5 × 53.3 cm (21 in) torpedo tubes (four bow, one stern); 14 × torpedoes or 26 TMA mines; 1 × 3.7 cm (1.5 in) Flak M42 AA gun; 2 × twin 2 cm (0.79 in) C/30 anti-aircraft guns

Service record
- Part of: 5th U-boat Flotilla; 7 July 1943 – 31 July 1944; 8th U-boat Flotilla; 1 August 1944 – 15 February 1945; 4th U-boat Flotilla; 16 February – 3 May 1945
- Identification codes: M 53 401
- Commanders: Kptlt. Otto Stoeffler; 7 July 1943 – 3 May 1945
- Operations: 4 patrols: 1st patrol: a. 11 – 29 July 1944; b. 31 July – 5 August 1944; c. 16 – 21 August 1944; d. 25 – 31 August 1944; e. 3 – 6 September 1944; 2nd patrol: 14 October – 17 November 1944; 3rd patrol: 22 November – 4 December 1944; 4th patrol: a. 23 January – 17 March 1945; b. 19 – 21 March 1945
- Victories: 1 warship damaged (56 tons)

German submarine U-475 was a Type VIIC U-boat of Nazi Germany's Kriegsmarine during World War II.

She carried out four patrols. She damaged one warship.

She was scuttled on 3 May 1945 and broken up in 1947.

== Design ==
German Type VIIC submarines were preceded by the shorter Type VIIB submarines. U-475 had a displacement of 769 tonnes (757 long tons) when at the surface and 871 tonnes (857 long tons) while submerged. She had a total length of 67.10 m (220 ft 2 in), a pressure hull length of 50.50 m (165 ft 8 in), a beam of 6.20 m (20 ft 4 in), a height of 9.60 m (31 ft 6 in), and a draught of 4.74 m (15 ft 7 in). The submarine was powered by two Germaniawerft F46 four-stroke, six-cylinder supercharged diesel engines producing a total of 2,800 to 3,200 metric horsepower (2,060 to 2,350 kW; 2,760 to 3,160 shp) for use while surfaced, two Siemens-Schuckert GU 343/38–8 double-acting electric motors producing a total of 750 metric horsepower (550 kW; 740 shp) for use while submerged. She had two shafts and two 1.23 m (4 ft) propellers. The boat was capable of operating at depths of up to 230 metres (750 ft).

The submarine had a maximum surface speed of 17.7 knots (32.8 km/h; 20.4 mph) and a maximum submerged speed of 7.6 knots (14.1 km/h; 8.7 mph). When submerged, the boat could operate for 80 nautical miles (150 km; 92 mi) at 4 knots (7.4 km/h; 4.6 mph); when surfaced, she could travel 8,500 nautical miles (15,700 km; 9,800 mi) at 10 knots (19 km/h; 12 mph). U-475 was fitted with five 53.3 cm (21 in) torpedo tubes (four fitted at the bow and one at the stern), fourteen torpedoes, one 3.7 cm (1.5 in) Flak M42 and two twin 2 cm (0.79 in) C/30 anti-aircraft guns. The boat had a complement of between forty-four and sixty.

== Armament ==
=== FLAK weaponry ===
U-475 was mounted with two 2cm Flak C38 in a M 43U Zwilling mount with short folding shield on the upper Wintergarten. The M 43U mount was used on a number of U-boats (U-190, U-249, U-250, U-278, U-337, U-853, U-1058, U-1109, U-1023, U-1105, U-1165 and U-1306).

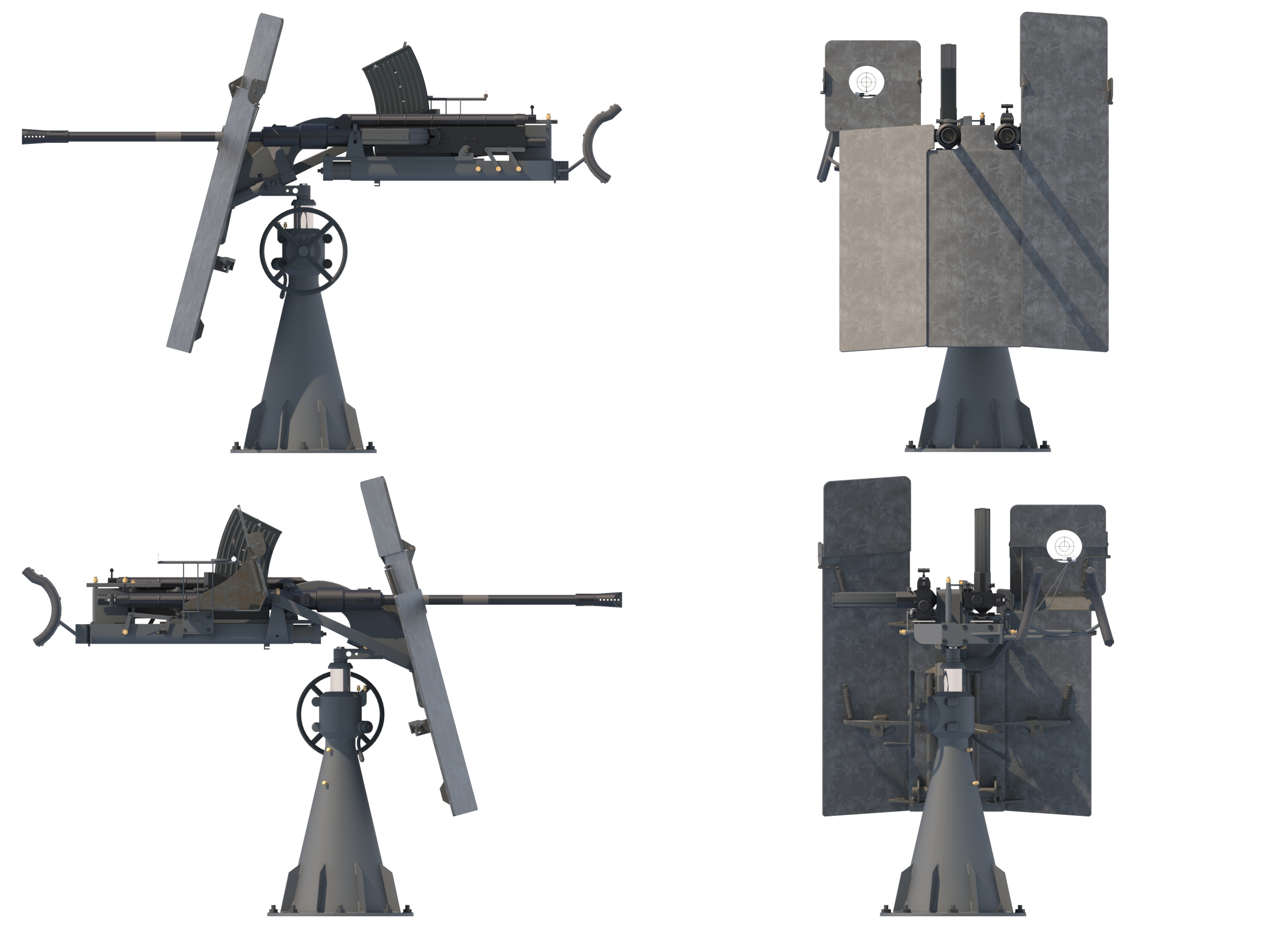
2 cm Flak C38 in a M 43U Zwilling mount with short folding shield.

== Service history ==
The submarine was laid down on 5 September 1942 in the Deutsche Werke, Kiel as yard number 306, launched on 28 May 1943 and commissioned on 7 July under the command of Kapitänleutnant Otto Stoeffler.

She served with the 5th U-boat Flotilla from 7 July 1943 for training and was transferred to the 8th flotilla from 1 August 1944 for operations. She was reassigned to the 4th flotilla on 16 February 1945.

=== First patrol ===
U-475's first patrol was preceded by a short journey from Kiel in Germany to Helsinki in Finland. The patrol itself, split into four parts, commenced with her departure from Helsinki on 11 July 1944. On the 28th she damaged the Soviet patrol craft MO-107 in Viborg Bay.

=== Second patrol ===
Her second foray was relatively uneventful – starting in Danzig (now Gdansk) on 14 October 1944. She returned to Danzig on 17 November.

=== Third patrol ===
The submarine steamed as far north as a point east of Stockholm before returning to Danzig (on 4 December 1944).

=== Fourth patrol ===
The boat's fourth sortie also started and finished in Danzig and at 54 days duration, was her longest.

== Fate ==
U-475 had moved from Danzig to Kiel in March 1945. She was scuttled on 3 May 1945 at Kiel-Wik. The wreck was broken up in 1947.

== Summary of raiding history ==
Date	Ship Name	Nationality	Tonnage (Note: Merchant ship tonnages are in gross register tons. Military vessels are listed by tons displacement.)	Fate
28 July 1944	MO-107	Soviet Navy	56	Damaged

== Bibliography ==
- Busch, Rainer; Röll, Hans-Joachim (1999). German U-boat commanders of World War II : a biographical dictionary. Translated by Brooks, Geoffrey. London, Annapolis, Md: Greenhill Books, Naval Institute Press. ISBN 1-55750-186-6.
- Busch, Rainer; Röll, Hans-Joachim (1999). Deutsche U-Boot-Verluste von September 1939 bis Mai 1945 [German U-boat losses from September 1939 to May 1945]. Der U-Boot-Krieg (in German). Vol. IV. Hamburg, Berlin, Bonn: Mittler. ISBN 3-8132-0514-2.
- Gröner, Erich; Jung, Dieter; Maass, Martin (1991). U-boats and Mine Warfare Vessels. German Warships 1815–1945. Vol. 2. Translated by Thomas, Keith; Magowan, Rachel. London: Conway Maritime Press. ISBN 0-85177-593-4.
