= German submarine U-278 =

German World War II submarine

Coordinates: 55°44′N 8°21′W

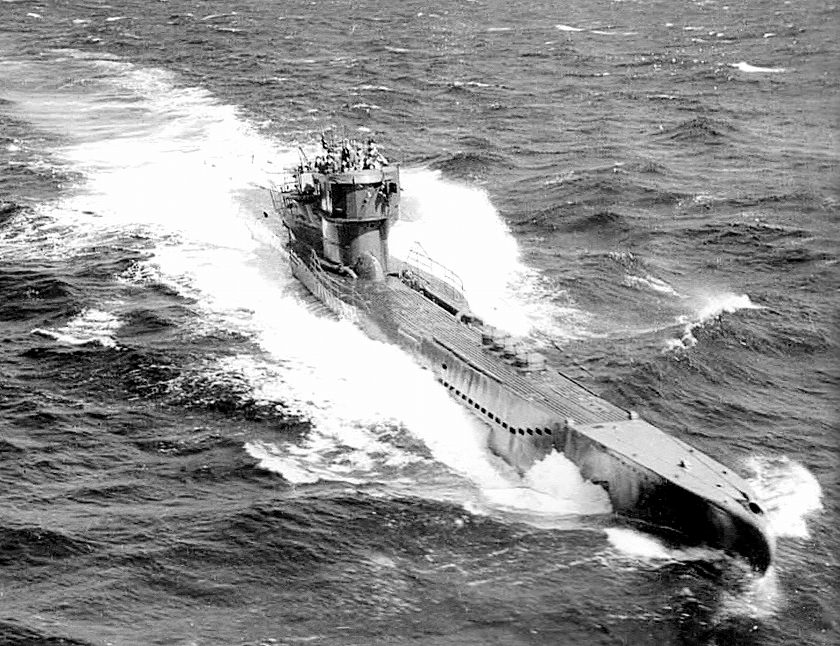
- U-278 seen from a B-24 Liberator

History

Nazi Germany
- Name: U-278
- Ordered: 10 April 1941
- Builder: Bremer Vulkan, Bremen-Vegesack
- Yard number: 43
- Laid down: 26 March 1942
- Launched: 2 December 1942
- Commissioned: 16 January 1943
- Fate: Surrendered on 9 May 1945; Scuttled on 31 December 1945 during Operation Deadlight

General characteristics
- Class & type: Type VIIC submarine
- Displacement: 769 tonnes (757 long tons) surfaced; 871 t (857 long tons) submerged
- Length: 67.10 m (220 ft 2 in) o/a; 50.50 m (165 ft 8 in) pressure hull
- Beam: 6.20 m (20 ft 4 in) o/a; 4.70 m (15 ft 5 in) pressure hull
- Height: 9.60 m (31 ft 6 in)
- Draught: 4.74 m (15 ft 7 in)
- Installed power: 2,800–3,200 PS (2,100–2,400 kW; 2,800–3,200 bhp) (diesels); 750 PS (550 kW; 740 shp) (electric)
- Propulsion: 2 shafts; 2 × diesel engines; 2 × electric motors
- Speed: 17.7 knots (32.8 km/h; 20.4 mph) surfaced; 7.6 knots (14.1 km/h; 8.7 mph) submerged
- Range: 8,500 nmi (15,700 km; 9,800 mi) at 10 knots (19 km/h; 12 mph) surfaced; 80 nmi (150 km; 92 mi) at 4 knots (7.4 km/h; 4.6 mph) submerged
- Test depth: 230 m (750 ft); Crush depth: 250–295 m (820–968 ft)
- Complement: 4 officers, 40–56 enlisted
- Armament: 5 × 53.3 cm (21 in) torpedo tubes (four bow, one stern); 14 × torpedoes or 26 TMA mines; 1 × 8.8 cm (3.46 in) deck gun (220 rounds); 2 × twin 2 cm (0.79 in) C/30 anti-aircraft guns

Service record
- Part of: 8th U-boat Flotilla; 16 January – 30 September 1943; 7th U-boat Flotilla; 1 October – 31 December 1943; 11th U-boat Flotilla; 1 January – 31 August 1944; 13th U-boat Flotilla; 1 September 1944 – 8 May 1945
- Identification codes: M 49 691
- Commanders: Kptlt. Joachim Franze; 16 January 1943 – 9 May 1945
- Operations: 7 patrols: 1st patrol: 8 – 28 January 1944; 2nd patrol: 29 January – 19 February 1944; 3rd patrol: 4 March – 4 April 1944; 4th patrol: a. 24 April – 8 May 1944; b. 5 – 9 July 1944; c. 9 – 10 July 1944; d. 23 – 24 July 1944; 5th patrol: a. 2 August – 3 October 1944; b. 6 – 8 October 1944; 6th patrol: a. 12 – 20 December 1944; b. 23 December 1944 – 13 February 1945; 7th patrol: a. 10 April – 9 May 1945; b. 12 May 1945; c. 15 – 19 May 1945
- Victories: 1 merchant ship sunk (7,177 GRT); 1 warship sunk (1,810 tons)

German submarine U-278 was a Type VIIC U-boat of Nazi Germany's Kriegsmarine during World War II.

The submarine was laid down on 26 March 1942 at the Bremer Vulkan yard at Bremen-Vegesack as yard number 43. She was launched on 2 December and commissioned on 16 January 1943 under the command of Oberleutnant zur See Joachim Franze.

== Design ==
German Type VIIC submarines were preceded by the shorter Type VIIB submarines. U-278 had a displacement of 769 tonnes (757 long tons) when at the surface and 871 tonnes (857 long tons) while submerged. She had a total length of 67.10 m (220 ft 2 in), a pressure hull length of 50.50 m (165 ft 8 in), a beam of 6.20 m (20 ft 4 in), a height of 9.60 m (31 ft 6 in), and a draught of 4.74 m (15 ft 7 in). The submarine was powered by two Germaniawerft F46 four-stroke, six-cylinder supercharged diesel engines producing a total of 2,800 to 3,200 metric horsepower (2,060 to 2,350 kW; 2,760 to 3,160 shp) for use while surfaced, two AEG GU 460/8–27 double-acting electric motors producing a total of 750 metric horsepower (550 kW; 740 shp) for use while submerged. She had two shafts and two 1.23 m (4 ft) propellers. The boat was capable of operating at depths of up to 230 metres (750 ft).

The submarine had a maximum surface speed of 17.7 knots (32.8 km/h; 20.4 mph) and a maximum submerged speed of 7.6 knots (14.1 km/h; 8.7 mph). When submerged, the boat could operate for 80 nautical miles (150 km; 92 mi) at 4 knots (7.4 km/h; 4.6 mph); when surfaced, she could travel 8,500 nautical miles (15,700 km; 9,800 mi) at 10 knots (19 km/h; 12 mph). U-278 was fitted with five 53.3 cm (21 in) torpedo tubes (four fitted at the bow and one at the stern), fourteen torpedoes, one 8.8 cm (3.46 in) SK C/35 naval gun, 220 rounds, and two twin 2 cm (0.79 in) C/30 anti-aircraft guns. The boat had a complement of between forty-four and sixty.

== Armament ==
=== FLAK weaponry ===
U-278 was mounted with two 2cm Flak C38 in a M43U Zwilling mount with short folding shield on the upper Wintergarten. The M43U mount was used on a number of U-boats (U-190, U-249, U-250, U-337, U-475, U-853, U-1058, U-1109, U-1023, U-1105, U-1165 and U-1306).

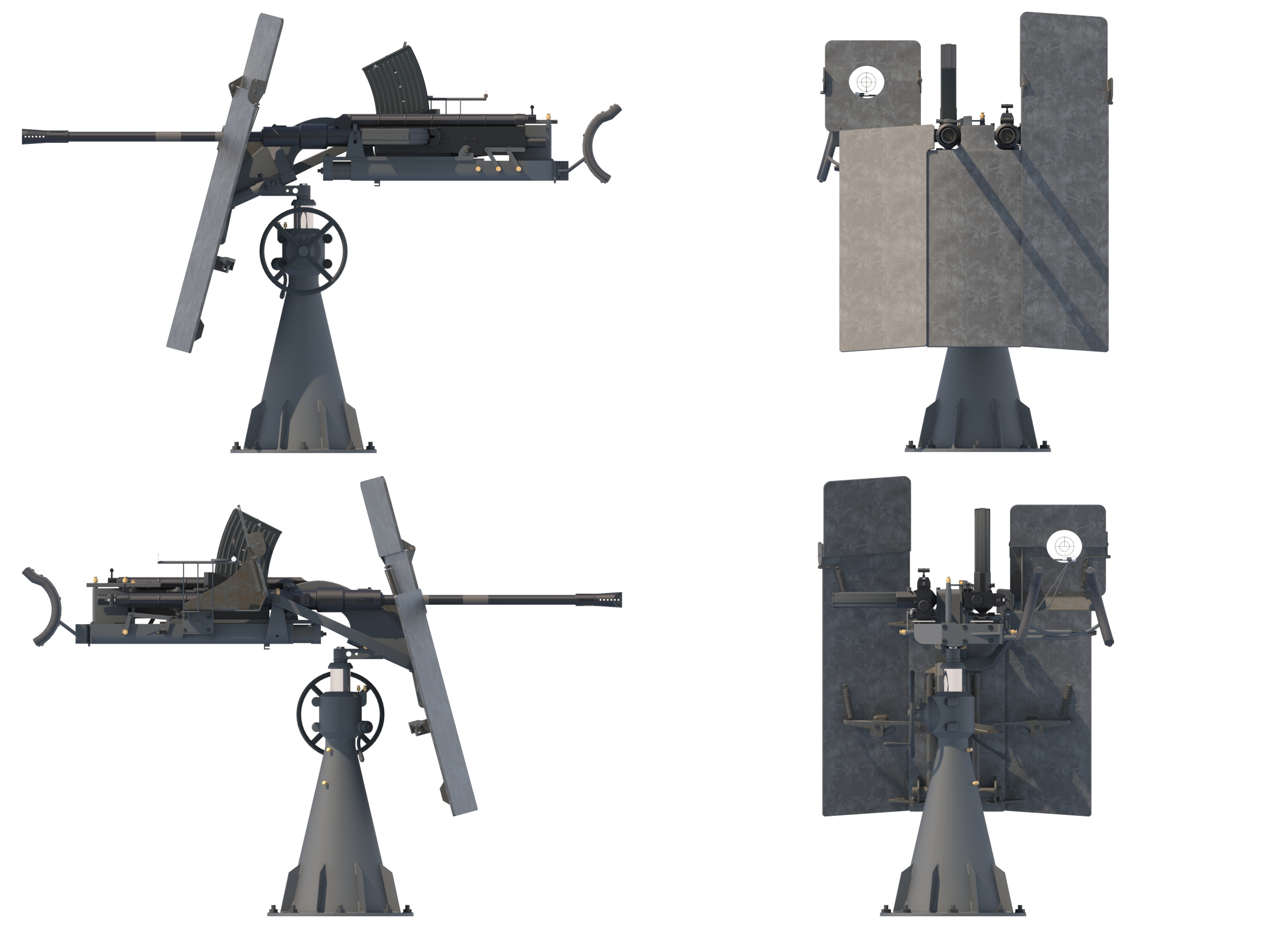
2 cm Flak C38 in a M43U Zwilling mount with short folding shield.

== Service history ==
U-278 served with the 8th U-boat Flotilla for training from January to September 1943 and operationally with the 7th U-boat Flotilla from 1 October 1943. She was reassigned to the 11th flotilla until 31 August 1944 and then the 13th flotilla until the war's end. She carried out seven patrols, sinking two ships; a commercial vessel of 7,177 GRT and a warship of 1,810 tons. She was a member of eight wolfpacks.

She carried out a short voyage between Kiel in Germany and Bergen in Norway over December 1943 and January 1944.

=== First patrol ===
The boat departed Bergen on 8 January 1944 and sank the Penelope Barker on the 25th, about 115 nautical miles (213 km; 132 mi) north of the North Cape. She docked at Hammerfest on the 28th.

=== Second and third patrols ===
She sank the British destroyer Hardy southeast of Bear Island on 30 January 1944.

On her third sortie, she steamed through the Norwegian and Barents Seas.

=== Fourth patrol ===
U-278 left Hammerfest on 24 April 1944. On 3 May she was attacked by a Fairey Swordfish of 822 Naval Air Squadron FAA, (Fleet Air Arm), from the aircraft carrier HMS Fencer and a Swordfish and a Martlet, both of 833 Squadron from Activity. The U-boat sustained only superficial damage; her crew claimed the Martlet shot down. However, all three aircraft returned safely to their carriers.

The boat then embarked on a series of short 'hops' between Bergen, Ramsund and Narvik in July 1944.

=== Fifth patrol ===
Patrol number five was her longest at 63 days. It took the submarine north and east to the Kara Sea.

She then moved from Narvik to Trondheim in October 1944.

=== Sixth patrol ===
This sortie was divided into two parts, during which the boat travelled as far as the northern coast of Scotland.

=== Seventh patrol and surrender ===
Her last patrol was from Narvik, between 10 April 1945 and 9 May.

Following the German capitulation, the boat was moved from Norway to Loch Eriboll in Scotland, for Operation Deadlight. She was sunk on 31 December 1945 by gunfire from HMS Onslaught and ORP Blyskawica.

== Summary of raiding history ==
Date	Ship Name	Nationality	Tonnage (Note: Merchant ship tonnages are in gross register tons. Military vessels are listed by tons displacement.)	Fate
25 January 1944	Penelope Barker	United States	7,177	Sunk
30 January 1944	HMS Hardy	Royal Navy	1,810	Sunk

== Bibliography ==
- Busch, Rainer; Röll, Hans-Joachim (1999). German U-boat commanders of World War II : a biographical dictionary. Translated by Brooks, Geoffrey. London, Annapolis, Md: Greenhill Books, Naval Institute Press. ISBN 1-55750-186-6.
- Busch, Rainer; Röll, Hans-Joachim (1999). Der U-Boot-Krieg, 1939-1945: Deutsche U-Boot-Verluste von September 1939 bis Mai 1945 [German U-boat losses from September 1939 to May 1945] (in German). Vol. IV. Hamburg, Berlin, Bonn: Mittler. ISBN 3-8132-0514-2.
- Gröner, Erich; Jung, Dieter; Maass, Martin (1991). U-boats and Mine Warfare Vessels. German Warships 1815–1945. Vol. 2. Translated by Thomas, Keith; Magowan, Rachel. London: Conway Maritime Press. ISBN 0-85177-593-4.
