= German submarine U-1023 =

German World War II submarine

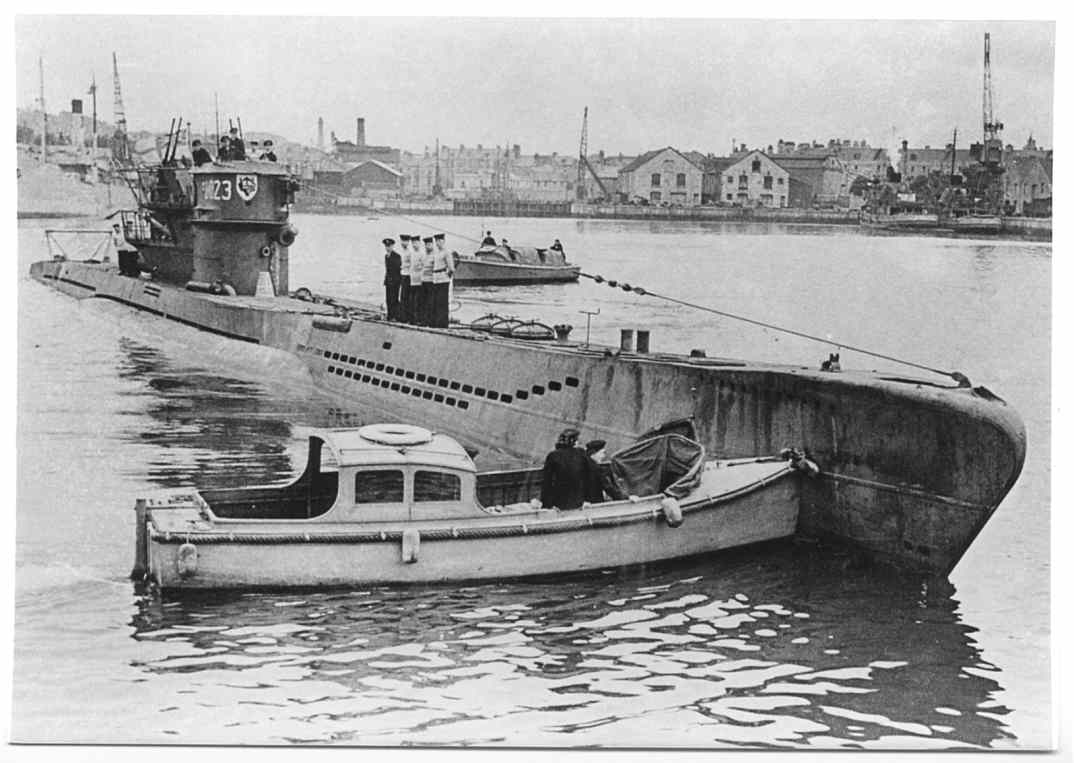
- U-1023 in Plymouth harbour in May 1945

History

Nazi Germany
- Name: U-1023
- Ordered: 13 June 1942
- Builder: Blohm & Voss, Hamburg
- Yard number: 223
- Laid down: 20 May 1943
- Launched: 3 May 1944
- Commissioned: 15 June 1944
- Fate: Surrendered on 10 May 1945; Sunk on 7 January 1946 during Operation Deadlight

General characteristics
- Class & type: Type VIIC/41 submarine
- Displacement: 759 tonnes (747 long tons) surfaced; 860 t (846 long tons) submerged
- Length: 67.10 m (220 ft 2 in) o/a; 50.50 m (165 ft 8 in) pressure hull
- Beam: 6.20 m (20 ft 4 in) o/a; 4.70 m (15 ft 5 in) pressure hull
- Height: 9.60 m (31 ft 6 in)
- Draught: 4.74 m (15 ft 7 in)
- Installed power: 2,800–3,200 PS (2,100–2,400 kW; 2,800–3,200 bhp) (diesels); 750 PS (550 kW; 740 shp) (electric)
- Propulsion: 2 shafts; 2 × diesel engines; 2 × electric motors
- Speed: 17.7 knots (32.8 km/h; 20.4 mph) surfaced; 7.6 knots (14.1 km/h; 8.7 mph) submerged
- Range: 8,500 nmi (15,700 km; 9,800 mi) at 10 knots (19 km/h; 12 mph) surfaced; 80 nmi (150 km; 92 mi) at 4 knots (7.4 km/h; 4.6 mph) submerged
- Test depth: 230 m (750 ft); Calculated crush depth: 250–295 m (820–968 ft)
- Complement: 44-52 officers & ratings
- Armament: 5 × 53.3 cm (21 in) torpedo tubes (4 bow, 1 stern); 14 × torpedoes; 1 × 8.8 cm (3.46 in) deck gun (220 rounds); 1 × 3.7 cm (1.5 in) Flak M42 AA gun; 2 × 2 cm (0.79 in) C/30 AA guns

Service record
- Part of: 31st U-boat Flotilla; 15 June 1944 – 28 February 1945; 11th U-boat Flotilla; 1 March – 8 May 1945
- Identification codes: M 38 963
- Commanders: Oblt.z.S. Wolfgang Strenger; 15 June 1944 – 9 March 1945; Kptlt. Heinrich Schroeteler; 10 March – 10 May 1945
- Operations: 1 patrol: 25 March – 10 May 1945
- Victories: 1 warship sunk (335 tons); 1 merchant ship damaged (7,345 GRT)

German submarine U-1023 was a Type VIIC/41 U-boat of Nazi Germany's Kriegsmarine. She was laid down on 20 May 1943 by Blohm & Voss in Hamburg, Germany, and commissioned on 15 June 1944 with Oberleutnant Wolfgang Strenger in command. U-1023 sank one ship and damaged one more for a total of 7,345 GRT and 335 tons. After the war she was sunk in Operation Deadlight.

== Design ==
German Type VIIC/41 submarines were preceded by the heavier Type VIIC submarines. U-1023 had a displacement of 759 tonnes (747 long tons) when at the surface and 860 tonnes (850 long tons) while submerged. She had a total length of 67.10 m (220 ft 2 in), a pressure hull length of 50.50 m (165 ft 8 in), a beam of 6.20 m (20 ft 4 in), a height of 9.60 m (31 ft 6 in), and a draught of 4.74 m (15 ft 7 in). The submarine was powered by two Germaniawerft F46 four-stroke, six-cylinder supercharged diesel engines producing a total of 2,800 to 3,200 metric horsepower (2,060 to 2,350 kW; 2,760 to 3,160 shp) for use while surfaced, two Brown, Boveri & Cie GG UB 720/8 double-acting electric motors producing a total of 750 metric horsepower (550 kW; 740 shp) for use while submerged. She had two shafts and two 1.23 m (4 ft) propellers. The boat was capable of operating at depths of up to 230 metres (750 ft).

The submarine had a maximum surface speed of 17.7 knots (32.8 km/h; 20.4 mph) and a maximum submerged speed of 7.6 knots (14.1 km/h; 8.7 mph). When submerged, the boat could operate for 80 nautical miles (150 km; 92 mi) at 4 knots (7.4 km/h; 4.6 mph); when surfaced, she could travel 8,500 nautical miles (15,700 km; 9,800 mi) at 10 knots (19 km/h; 12 mph). U-1023 was fitted with five 53.3 cm (21 in) torpedo tubes (four fitted at the bow and one at the stern), fourteen torpedoes, one 8.8 cm (3.46 in) SK C/35 naval gun, (220 rounds), one 3.7 cm (1.5 in) Flak M42 and two 2 cm (0.79 in) C/30 anti-aircraft guns. The boat had a complement of between forty-four and sixty.

== Armament ==
=== FLAK weaponry ===
U-1023 was mounted with a single 3.7 cm Flakzwilling M43U gun on the rare LM 43U mount. The LM 43U mount was the final design of mount used on U-boats and is only known to be installed on U-boats (U-249, U-826, U-977, U-1171, U-1305 and U-1306). The 3.7 cm Flak M42U was the marine version of the 3.7 cm Flak used by the Kriegsmarine on Type VII and Type IX U-boats. U-1023 was mounted with two 2cm Flak C38 in a M 43U Zwilling mount with short folding shield on the upper Wintergarten. The M 43U mount was used on a number of U-boats (U-190, U-250, U-278, U-337, U-475, U-853, U-1058, U-1109, U-1105, U-1165 and U-1306).

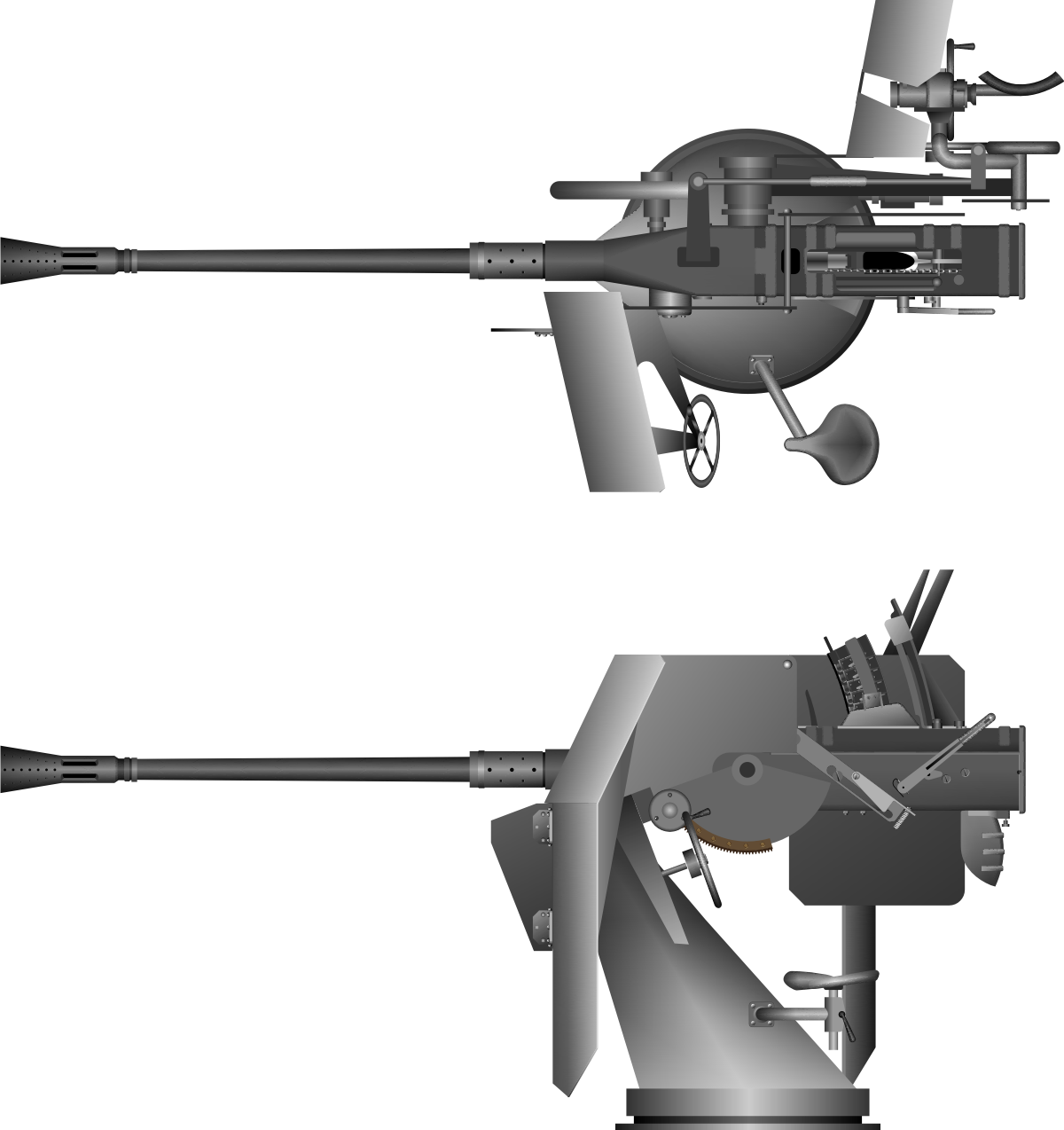
The single 3.7 cm Flak M42U gun on the LM 43U mount.

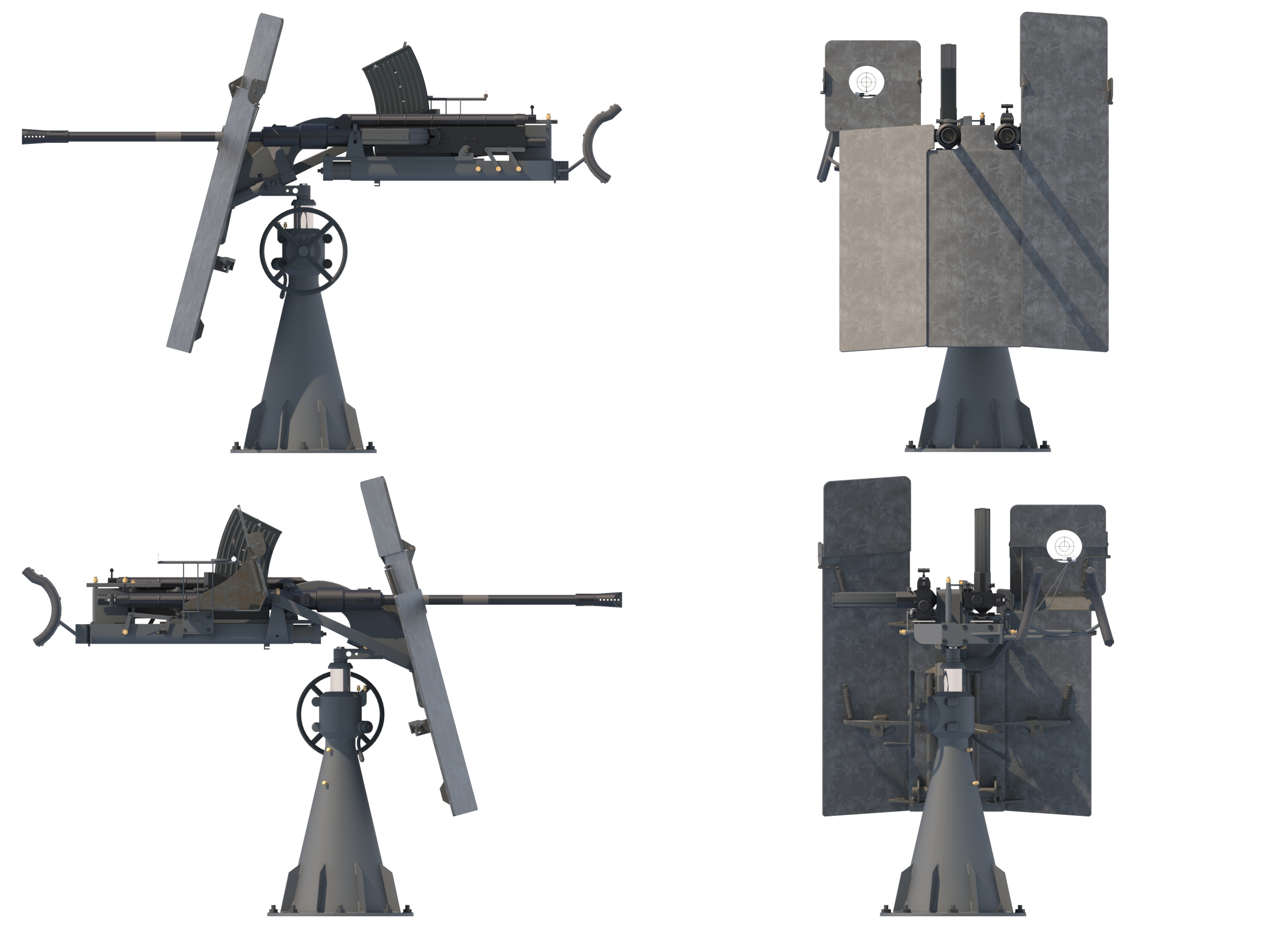
2 cm Flak C38 in a M 43U Zwilling mount with short folding shield.

== Service history ==
U-1023 was ordered by the Kriegsmarine on 13 June 1942. She was laid down about one year later at Blohm & Voss, Hamburg on 20 May 1943. Almost a year later, U-1023 was launched from Hamburg on 3 May 1944. She was formally commissioned later that year on 15 June. U-1023 carried 5 × 53.3 cm (21 in) torpedo tubes (4 located in the bow, 1 in the stern) and had one 8.8 cm (3.46 in) deck gun with 220 rounds. She could also carry 14 G7e torpedoes or 26 TMA mines and had a crew of 44–52 men. She was one of the U-boats that used the Schnorchel underwater breathing apparatus.

After her redesignation as a front-line U-boat, U-1023 left port on her first and only patrol. By that time, she had moved from Kiel to her later location in Bergen via a stopover in Horten Naval Base. After leaving on 25 March 1945 for her first patrol, U-1023 intercepted and attacked Riverton, a 7,345 GRT British steam merchant on 23 April. She was damaged and beached off St. Ives Bay. Later, on 7 May 1945, the last day of the war in Europe, U-1023 found the 335 tons Norwegian minesweeper HNoMS NYMS 382, which was sunk with 22 dead.

=== Fate ===
U-1023 was surrendered at Weymouth, England on 10 May 1945. After the war she was paraded up the west coast of the UK visiting a number of ports including Plymouth, Brixham, Falmouth, Bristol, Swansea, Liverpool, Holyhead, Manchester, Fleetwood, Belfast, Glasgow, Greenock, Rothsay, Oban. Several hundred thousand visitors were given a tour of the boat during this time. U-1023 was then used in Operation Deadlight and sunk by the Allies on 7 January 1946.

== Summary of raiding history ==
Date	Ship Name	Nationality	Tonnage (Note: Merchant ship tonnages are in gross register tons. Military vessels are listed by tons displacement.)	Fate
23 April 1945	Riverton	United Kingdom	7,345	Damaged
7 May 1945	HNoMS NYMS-382	Royal Norwegian Navy	335	Sunk

== See also ==
- German U-boat bases in occupied Norway
- Actions of 7–8 May 1945

== Bibliography ==
- Gröner, Erich; Jung, Dieter; Maass, Martin (1991). German Warships 1815–1945, U-boats and Mine Warfare Vessels. Vol. 2. Translated by Thomas, Keith; Magowan, Rachel. London: Conway Maritime Press. ISBN 0-85177-593-4.
- Busch, Rainer; Röll, Hans-Joachim (1999). German U-boat commanders of World War II : a biographical dictionary. Translated by Brooks, Geoffrey. London, Annapolis, Md: Greenhill Books, Naval Institute Press. ISBN 1-55750-186-6.
- Busch, Rainer; Röll, Hans-Joachim (1999). Deutsche U-Boot-Verluste von September 1939 bis Mai 1945 [German U-boat losses from September 1939 to May 1945]. Der U-Boot-Krieg (in German). Vol. IV. Hamburg; Berlin; Bonn: Mittler. ISBN 3-8132-0514-2.
