= German submarine U-1165 =

German World War II submarine

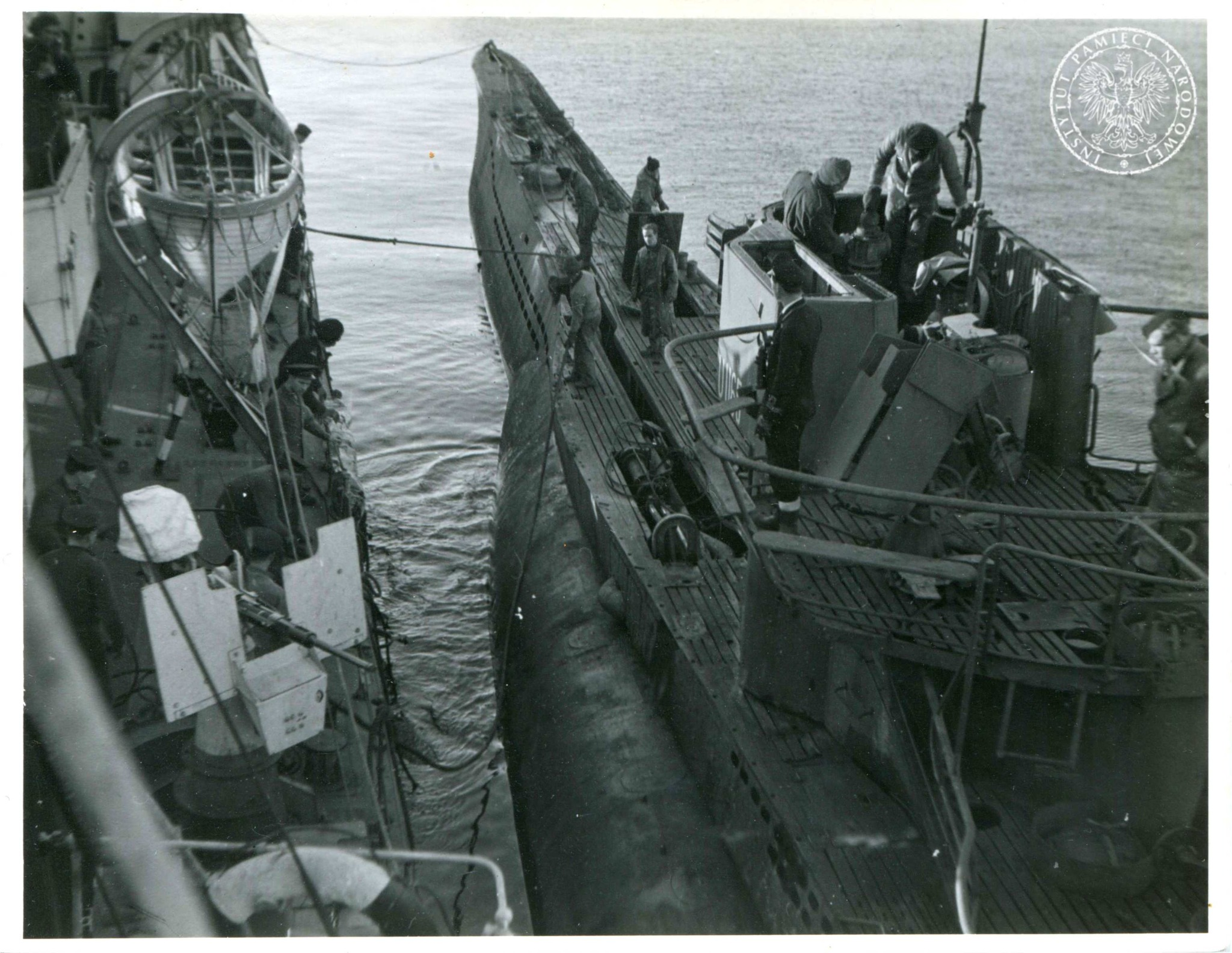
- ORP Krakowiak is preparing for the U-1165 towing operation

History

Nazi Germany
- Name: U-1165
- Ordered: 14 October 1941
- Builder: Danziger Werft AG, Danzig
- Yard number: 137
- Laid down: 31 December 1942
- Launched: 20 July 1943
- Commissioned: 17 November 1943
- Fate: Surrendered on 9 May 1945; Sunk on 30 December 1945 during Operation Deadlight

General characteristics
- Class & type: Type VIIC/41 submarine
- Displacement: 759 tonnes (747 long tons) surfaced; 860 t (846 long tons) submerged
- Length: 67.23 m (220 ft 7 in) o/a; 50.50 m (165 ft 8 in) pressure hull
- Beam: 6.20 m (20 ft 4 in) o/a; 4.70 m (15 ft 5 in) pressure hull
- Height: 9.60 m (31 ft 6 in)
- Draught: 4.74 m (15 ft 7 in)
- Installed power: 2,800–3,200 PS (2,100–2,400 kW; 2,800–3,200 bhp) (diesels); 750 PS (550 kW; 740 shp) (electric)
- Propulsion: 2 shafts; 2 × diesel engines; 2 × electric motors
- Speed: 17.7 knots (32.8 km/h; 20.4 mph) surfaced; 7.6 knots (14.1 km/h; 8.7 mph) submerged
- Range: 8,500 nmi (15,700 km; 9,800 mi) at 10 knots (19 km/h; 12 mph) surfaced; 80 nmi (150 km; 92 mi) at 4 knots (7.4 km/h; 4.6 mph) submerged
- Test depth: 230 m (750 ft); Calculated crush depth: 250–295 m (820–968 ft)
- Complement: 44-52 officers & ratings
- Armament: 5 × 53.3 cm (21 in) torpedo tubes (4 bow, 1 stern); 14 × torpedoes; 1 × 8.8 cm (3.46 in) deck gun (220 rounds); 1 × 3.7 cm (1.5 in) Flak M42 AA gun; 2 × 2 cm (0.79 in) C/30 AA guns

Service record
- Part of: 8th U-boat Flotilla; 17 November 1943 – 31 May 1944; 9th U-boat Flotilla; 1 June – 1 August 1944; 11th U-boat Flotilla; 1 August 1944 – 8 May 1945
- Identification codes: M 55 256
- Commanders: Oblt.z.S. Hans Homann; 17 November 1943 – 9 May 1945
- Operations: 4 patrols: 1st patrol: a. 9 June – 5 July 1944; b. 9 – 10 July 1944; c. 28 July 1944; d. 11 – 13 August 1944; e. 15 – 17 August 1944; f. 7 – 12 September 1944; g. 16 – 17 September 1944; 2nd patrol: 23 September – 24 October 1944; 3rd patrol: a. 12 – 25 November 1944; b. 22 – 26 January 1945; c. 7 – 11 April 1945; d. 18 – 20 April 1945; 4th patrol: a. 21 April – 5 May 1945; b. 12 May 1945; c. 15 – 19 May 1945
- Victories: 1 warship sunk (53 tons)

German submarine U-1165 was a Type VIIC/41 U-boat built for Nazi Germany's Kriegsmarine for service during World War II. She was laid down on 31 December 1942 by Danziger Werft, Danzig as yard number 137, launched on 20 July 1943 and commissioned on 17 November 1943 under Oberleutnant zur See Hans Homann.

== Design ==
Like all Type VIIC/41 U-boats, U-1165 had a displacement of 759 tonnes (747 long tons) when at the surface and 860 tonnes (850 long tons) while submerged. She had a total length of 67.23 m (220 ft 7 in), a pressure hull length of 50.50 m (165 ft 8 in), a beam of 6.20 m (20 ft 4 in), and a draught of 4.74 m (15 ft 7 in). The submarine was powered by two Germaniawerft F46 supercharged six-cylinder four-stroke diesel engines producing a total of 2,800 to 3,200 metric horsepower (2,060 to 2,350 kW; 2,760 to 3,160 shp) and two SSW GU 343/38-8 double-acting electric motors producing a total of 750 metric horsepower (550 kW; 740 shp) for use while submerged. The boat was capable of operating at a depth of 250 metres (820 ft).

The submarine had a maximum surface speed of 17.7 knots (32.8 km/h; 20.4 mph) and a submerged speed of 7.6 knots (14.1 km/h; 8.7 mph). When submerged, the boat could operate for 80 nautical miles (150 km; 92 mi) at 4 knots (7.4 km/h; 4.6 mph); when surfaced, she could travel 8,500 nautical miles (15,700 km; 9,800 mi) at 10 knots (19 km/h; 12 mph). U-1165 was fitted with five 53.3 cm (21 in) torpedo tubes (four fitted at the bow and one at the stern), fourteen torpedoes or 26 TMA or TMB Naval mines, one 8.8 cm (3.46 in) SK C/35 naval gun, (220 rounds), one 3.7 cm (1.5 in) Flak M42 and two 2 cm (0.79 in) C/30 anti-aircraft guns. Its complement was between forty-four and sixty.

== Armament ==
=== FLAK weaponry ===
U-1165 was mounted with two 2cm Flak C38 in a M 43U Zwilling mount with short folding shield on the upper Wintergarten. The M 43U mount was used on a number of U-boats (U-249, U-250, U-278, U-337, U-475, U-853, U-1023, U-1058, U-1109, U-1105 and U-1306).

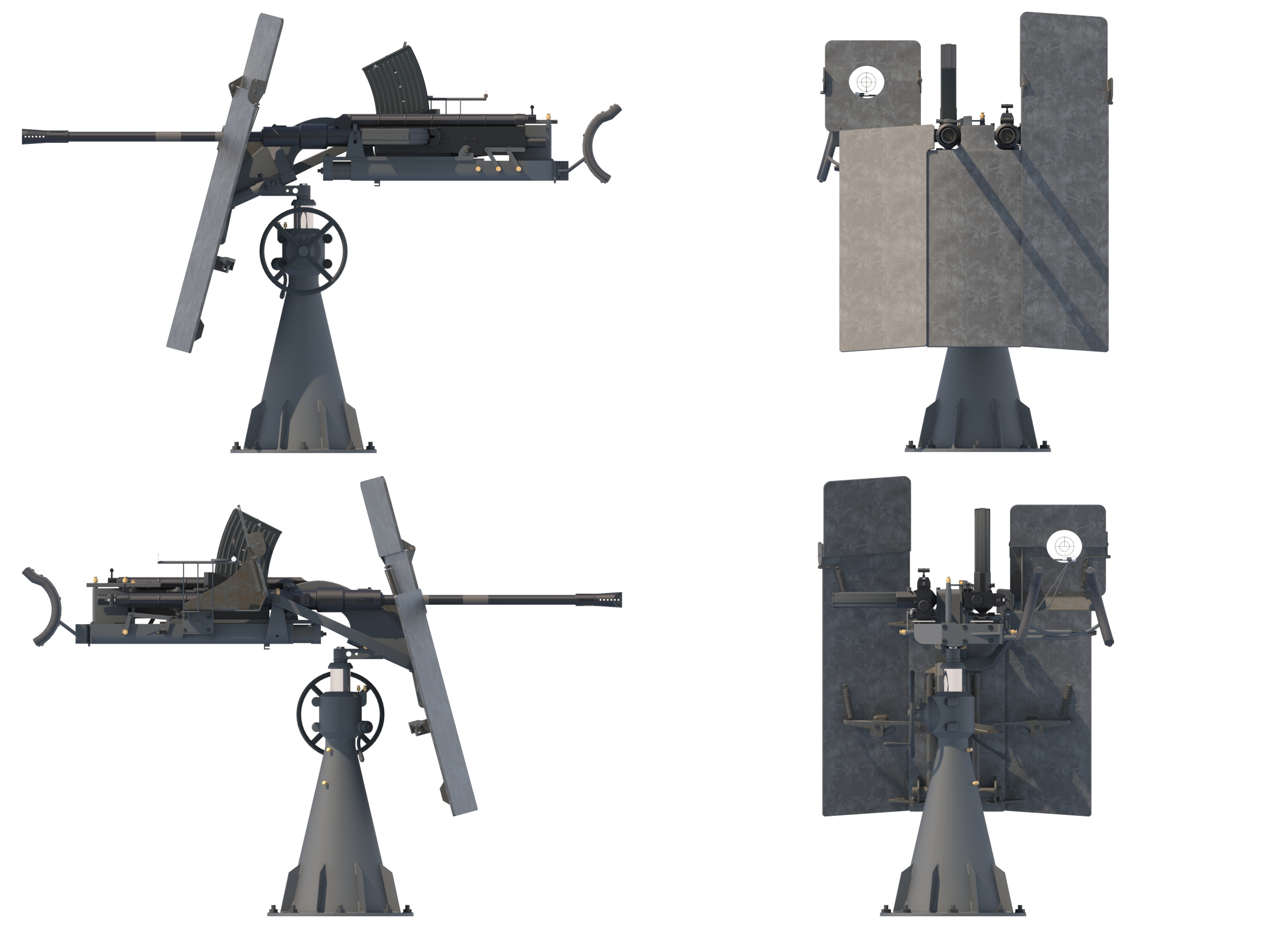
2 cm Flak C38 in a M 43U Zwilling mount with short folding shield.

== Service history ==
The boat's service career began on 17 November 1943 with the 8th Training Flotilla, followed by active service with 9th Flotilla on 1 June 1944, followed by 11th Flotilla on 1 August 1944. U-1165 took part in no wolfpacks. U-1165 surrendered on 9 May 1945 at Narvik, Norway. She was transferred to Loch Eriboll, Scotland on 19 May 1945. She was sunk on 30 December 1945 at 55°44′N 08°40′W, as part of Operation Deadlight.

== Summary of raiding history ==
Date	Ship Name	Nationality	Tonnage (Note: Merchant ship tonnages are in gross register tons. Military vessels are listed by tons displacement.)	Fate
17 October 1944	BMO-512	Soviet Navy	53	Sunk

== See also ==
- Battle of the Atlantic

== Bibliography ==
- Busch, Rainer; Röll, Hans-Joachim (1999). German U-boat commanders of World War II : a biographical dictionary. Translated by Brooks, Geoffrey. London, Annapolis, Md: Greenhill Books, Naval Institute Press. ISBN 1-55750-186-6.
- Gröner, Erich; Jung, Dieter; Maass, Martin (1991). German Warships 1815–1945, U-boats and Mine Warfare Vessels. Vol. 2. Translated by Thomas, Keith; Magowan, Rachel. London: Conway Maritime Press. ISBN 0-85177-593-4.
