= German submarine U-250 =

German World War II submarine

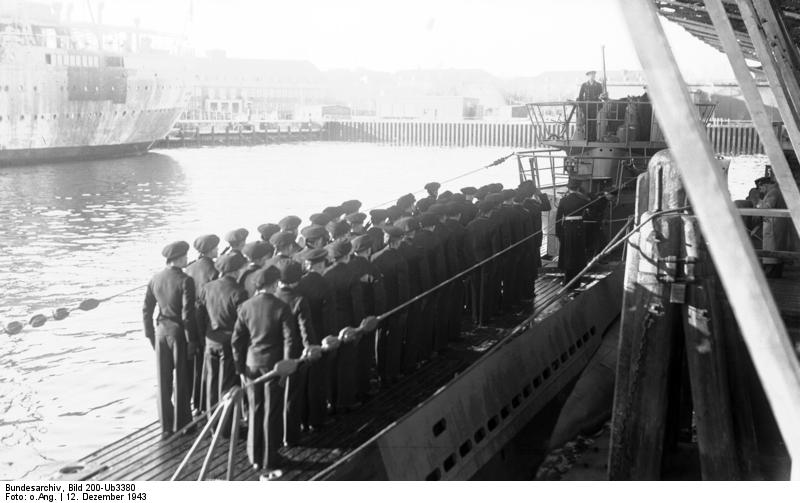
- U-250 being commissioned, 12 December 1943

History

Nazi Germany
- Name: U-250
- Ordered: 5 June 1941
- Builder: Germaniawerft, Kiel
- Yard number: 684
- Laid down: 9 January 1943
- Launched: 11 November 1943
- Commissioned: 12 December 1943
- Fate: Sunk on 30 July 1944; Refloated by Soviet Union on 14 September 1944

Soviet Union
- Name: TS-14
- Acquired: 14 September 1944
- Fate: Scrapped 20 August 1945

General characteristics
- Class & type: Type VIIC submarine
- Displacement: 769 tonnes (757 long tons) surfaced; 871 t (857 long tons) submerged
- Length: 67.23 m (220 ft 7 in) o/a; 50.50 m (165 ft 8 in) pressure hull
- Beam: 6.20 m (20 ft 4 in) o/a; 4.70 m (15 ft 5 in) pressure hull
- Height: 9.60 m (31 ft 6 in)
- Draught: 4.74 m (15 ft 7 in)
- Installed power: 2,800–3,200 PS (2,100–2,400 kW; 2,800–3,200 bhp) (diesels); 750 PS (550 kW; 740 shp) (electric)
- Propulsion: 2 shafts; 2 × diesel engines; 2 × electric motors
- Speed: 17.7 knots (32.8 km/h; 20.4 mph) surfaced; 7.6 knots (14.1 km/h; 8.7 mph) submerged
- Range: 8,500 nmi (15,700 km; 9,800 mi) at 10 knots (19 km/h; 12 mph) surfaced; 80 nmi (150 km; 92 mi) at 4 knots (7.4 km/h; 4.6 mph) submerged
- Test depth: 230 m (750 ft); Crush depth: 250–295 m (820–968 ft)
- Complement: 4 officers, 40–56 enlisted
- Armament: 5 × 53.3 cm (21 in) torpedo tubes (four bow, one stern); 14 × torpedoes or 26 TMA mines; 1 × 8.8 cm (3.46 in) deck gun(220 rounds); 1 × 3.7 cm (1.5 in) Flak M42 AA gun; 2 × twin 2 cm (0.79 in) C/30 anti-aircraft guns

Service record
- Part of: 5th U-boat Flotilla; 12 December 1943 – 1 July 1944; 8th U-boat Flotilla; 1 – 30 July 1944
- Identification codes: M 54 453
- Commanders: Kptlt. Werner-Karl Schmidt; 12 December 1943 – 30 July 1944
- Operations: 1 patrol: 26 – 30 July 1944
- Victories: 1 warship sunk (56 tons)

German submarine U-250 was a Type VIIC U-boat of Nazi Germany's navy (Kriegsmarine) during World War II. The submarine was laid down on 9 January 1943 at the Friedrich Krupp Germaniawerft yard at Kiel as yard number 684. She was launched on 11 November 1943 and commissioned on 12 December under the command of Kapitänleutnant Werner-Karl Schmidt.

In one patrol, she sank one ship.

The boat was sunk by the Soviet submarine chaser MO-103 in the Gulf of Finland (Baltic) on 30 July 1944 at 60°27′54″N 28°24′54″E

== Design ==
German Type VIIC submarines were preceded by the shorter Type VIIB submarines. U-250 had a displacement of 769 tonnes (757 long tons) when at the surface and 871 tonnes (857 long tons) while submerged. She had a total length of 67.10 m (220 ft 2 in), a pressure hull length of 50.50 m (165 ft 8 in), a beam of 6.20 m (20 ft 4 in), a height of 9.60 m (31 ft 6 in), and a draught of 4.74 m (15 ft 7 in). The submarine was powered by two Germaniawerft F46 four-stroke, six-cylinder supercharged diesel engines producing a total of 2,800 to 3,200 metric horsepower (2,060 to 2,350 kW; 2,760 to 3,160 shp) for use while surfaced, two AEG GU 460/8–27 double-acting electric motors producing a total of 750 metric horsepower (550 kW; 740 shp) for use while submerged. She had two shafts and two 1.23 m (4 ft) propellers. The boat was capable of operating at depths of up to 230 metres (750 ft).

The submarine had a maximum surface speed of 17.7 knots (32.8 km/h; 20.4 mph) and a maximum submerged speed of 7.6 knots (14.1 km/h; 8.7 mph). When submerged, the boat could operate for 80 nautical miles (150 km; 92 mi) at 4 knots (7.4 km/h; 4.6 mph); when surfaced, she could travel 8,500 nautical miles (15,700 km; 9,800 mi) at 10 knots (19 km/h; 12 mph). U-250 was fitted with five 53.3 cm (21 in) torpedo tubes (four fitted at the bow and one at the stern), fourteen torpedoes, one 8.8 cm (3.46 in) SK C/35 naval gun, (220 rounds), one 3.7 cm (1.5 in) Flak M42 and two twin 2 cm (0.79 in) C/30 anti-aircraft guns. The boat had a complement of between forty-four and sixty.

== Service history ==
After training with the 5th U-boat Flotilla at Kiel, U-250 transferred to the 8th flotilla on 1 July 1944.

=== Patrol, loss and capture ===
The boat's first and only patrol was preceded by a pair of short trips between Kiel in Germany, and Reval (now Tallinn in Estonia), and Zoppot (now Sopot, Poland). U-250's first sortie proper started with her departure from Zoppot on 26 July 1944. She sank the Soviet submarine chaser or patrol boat MO-105 on 26 July.

This sinking resulted in a concerted response on the part of the Soviets. MO-103 made the kill; dropping a pattern of depth charges which opened a large hole in the U-boat's pressure hull. Only six men escaped the submarine and were taken prisoner, among them Kapitänleutnant Schmidt; forty-six others did not. The U-boat sank in the relatively shallow depth of 27 m (89 ft). It was decided to raise U-250, despite her proximity to the German-held shore. Harassing artillery fire was met with a constant smokescreen while divers worked. The Soviets succeeded in raising the boat and taking her to Kronstadt in September 1944 where she was examined. On 12 April 1945 she was renamed TS-14 for a planned reconstruction, but was declared a total loss on 20 August 1945 and broken up.

== Armament ==
=== FLAK weaponry ===
U-250 was mounted with a single 3.7 cm Flakzwilling M43U gun on the LM 42U mount. The LM 42U mount was the most common mount used with the 3.7 cm Flak M42U. The 3.7 cm Flak M42U was the marine version of the 3.7 cm Flak used by the Kriegsmarine on Type VII and Type IX U-boats. U-250 was mounted with two 2cm Flak C38 in a M 43U Zwilling mount with short folding shield on the upper Wintergarten. The M 43U mount was used on a number of U-boats (U-190, U-249, U-278, U-337, U-475, U-853, U-1058, U-1109, U-1023, U-1105, U-1165 and U-1306).

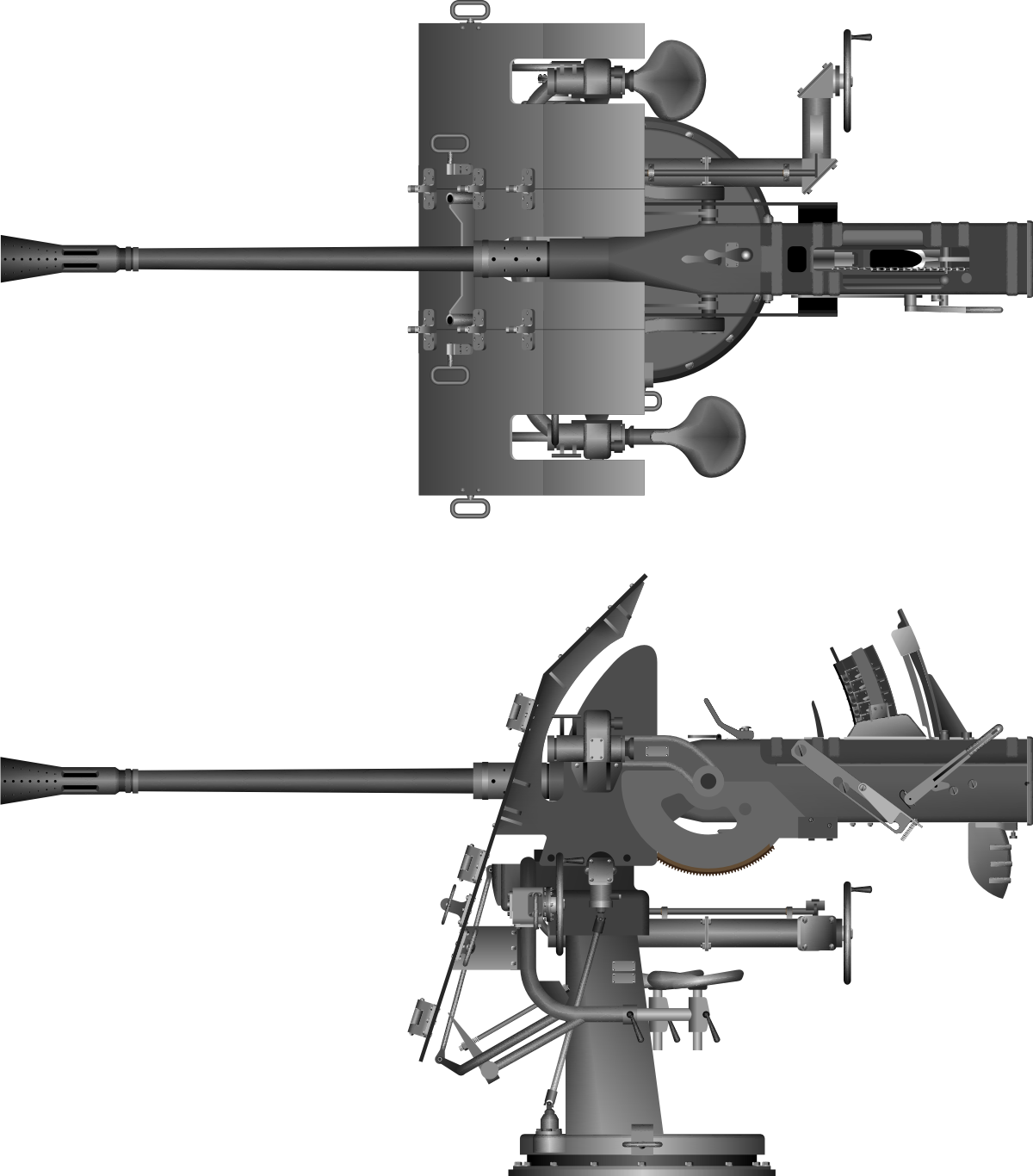
A single 3.7 cm Flak M42U gun on the LM 42U mount.

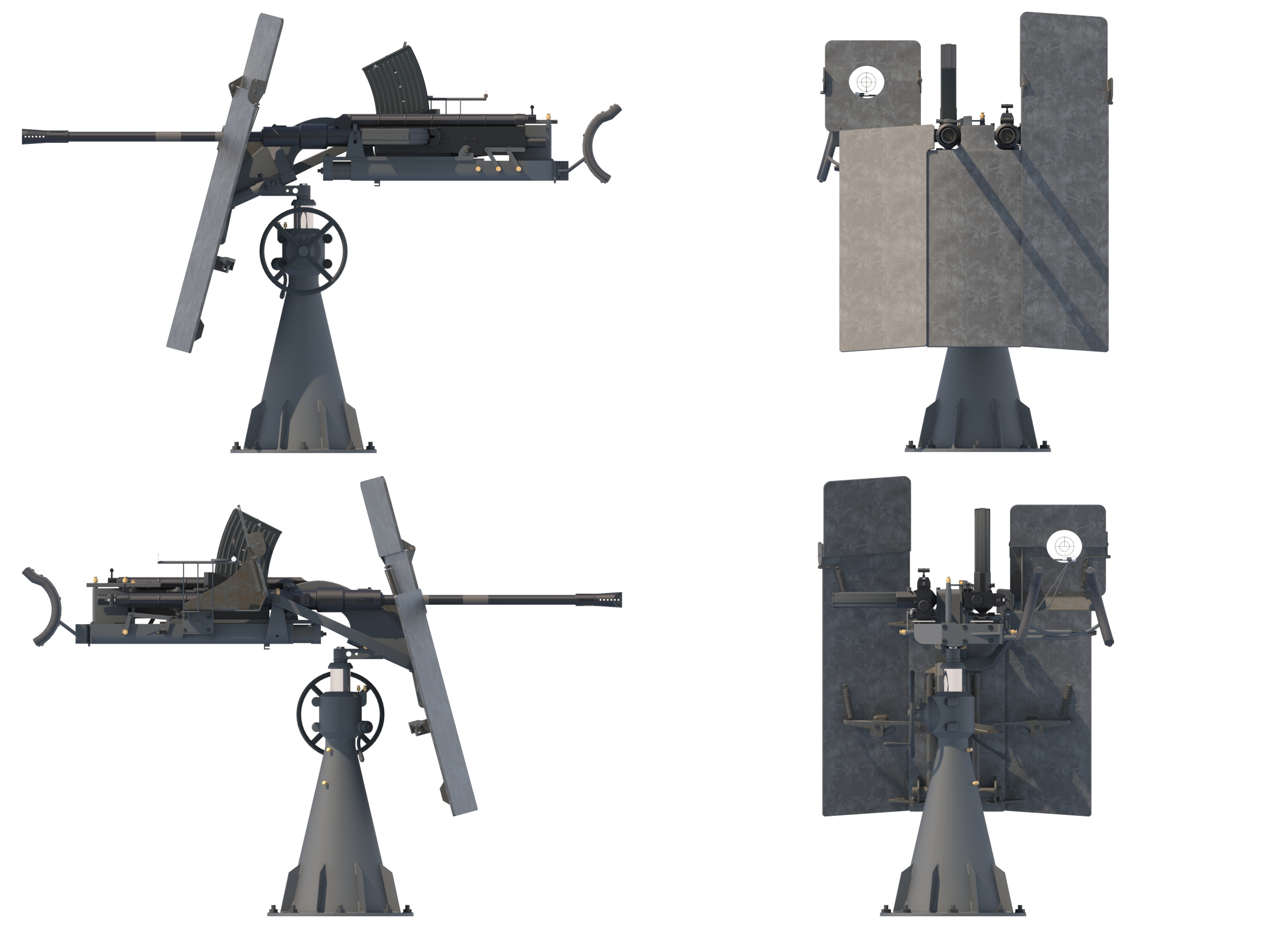
2 cm Flak C38 in a M 43U Zwilling mount with short folding shield.

== Summary of raiding history ==
Date	Ship Name	Nationality	Tonnage (Note: Merchant ship tonnages are in gross register tons. Military vessels are listed by tons displacement.)	Fate
30 July 1944	MO-105	Soviet Navy	56	Sunk

== Memory ==
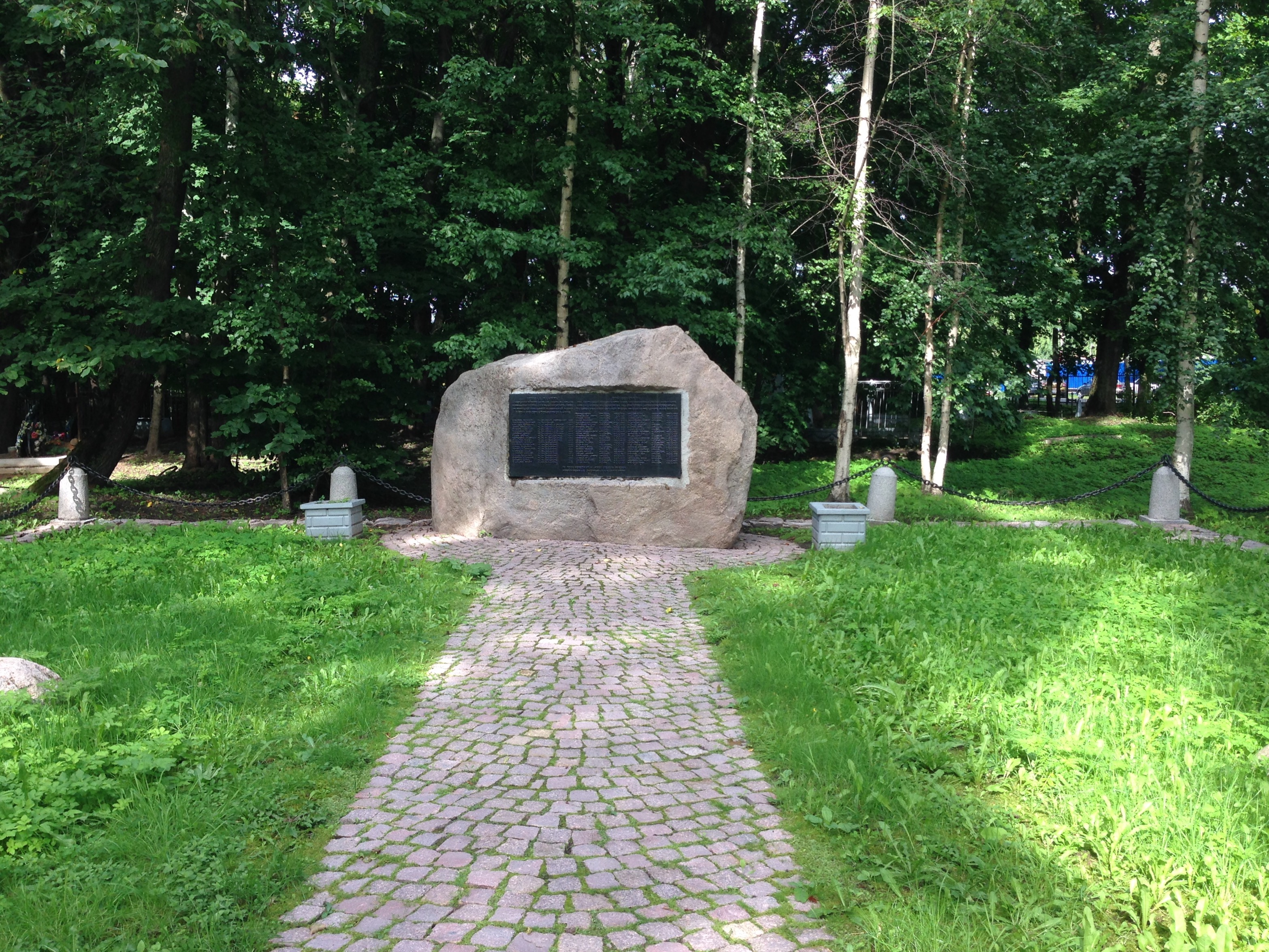
Cenotaph of sailors from MO-105 and U-250

On 22 October 1996, a joint memorial to Soviet sailors who died on MO-105 and German sailors who drowned on U-250 was opened at the Lutheran Cemetery in Kronstadt. A metal plate with 20 Soviet and 46 German names is attached to the granite stone. At the bottom of the slab there is a bilingual inscription on Russian and German: "Reconciled by death cry out for peace".

== Bibliography ==
- Busch, Rainer; Röll, Hans-Joachim (1999). German U-boat commanders of World War II : a biographical dictionary. Translated by Brooks, Geoffrey. London, Annapolis, Md: Greenhill Books, Naval Institute Press. ISBN 1-55750-186-6.
- Busch, Rainer; Röll, Hans-Joachim (1999). Deutsche U-Boot-Verluste von September 1939 bis Mai 1945 [German U-boat losses from September 1939 to May 1945]. Der U-Boot-Krieg (in German). Vol. IV. Hamburg, Berlin, Bonn: Mittler. ISBN 3-8132-0514-2.
- Gröner, Erich; Jung, Dieter; Maass, Martin (1991). U-boats and Mine Warfare Vessels. German Warships 1815–1945. Vol. 2. Translated by Thomas, Keith; Magowan, Rachel. London: Conway Maritime Press. ISBN 0-85177-593-4.
- Kemp, Paul (1999). U-Boats Destroyed – German Submarine Losses in the World Wars. London: Arms & Armour. ISBN 1-85409-515-3.
