= German submarine U-977 =

German World War II submarine

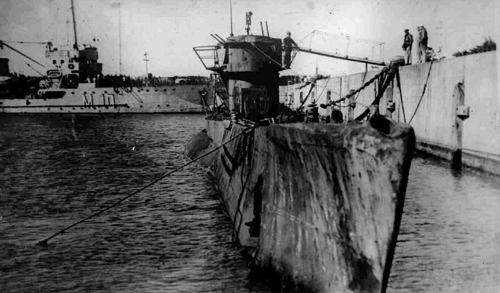
- U-977 moored at Mar del Plata naval base

History

Nazi Germany
- Name: U-977
- Ordered: 5 June 1941
- Builder: Blohm & Voss, Hamburg
- Yard number: 177
- Laid down: 24 July 1942
- Launched: 31 March 1943
- Commissioned: 6 May 1943
- Captured: Surrendered to Argentine Navy on 17 August 1945 at Mar del Plata, Argentina
- Fate: Sunk by torpedo from USS Atule during torpedo trials on 13 November 1946

General characteristics
- Class & type: Type VIIC submarine
- Displacement: 769 tonnes (757 long tons) surfaced; 871 t (857 long tons) submerged
- Length: 67.10 m (220.1 ft) o/a; 50.50 m (165.7 ft) pressure hull
- Beam: 6.20 m (20.3 ft) o/a; 4.70 m (15.4 ft) pressure hull
- Draught: 4.74 m (15.6 ft)
- Propulsion: Surfaced: 3,200 PS (2,400 kW; 3,200 bhp); Submerged: 750 PS (550 kW; 740 shp)
- Speed: Surfaced 17.7 knots (32.8 km/h; 20.4 mph); submerged 7.6 knots (14.1 km/h; 8.7 mph)
- Range: Surfaced: 8,500 nmi (15,700 km; 9,800 mi) at 10 knots (19 km/h; 12 mph); submerged: 80 nmi (150 km; 92 mi) at 4 knots (7.4 km/h; 4.6 mph)
- Test depth: Calculated crush depth: 220 m (720 ft)
- Complement: 4 officers, 40–56 enlisted
- Armament: 5 × 53.3 cm (21 in) torpedo tubes (four bow, one stern); 14 × torpedoes or 26 TMA mines; 1 × 8.8 cm (3.46 in) deck gun (220 rounds); 1 × twin 2 cm (0.79 in) C/30 anti-aircraft gun

Service record
- Part of: 5th U-boat Flotilla; 6 May – 30 September 1943; 21st U-boat Flotilla; 1 October 1943 – 28 February 1945; 31st U-boat Flotilla; 1 March – 8 May 1945
- Identification codes: M 51 994
- Commanders: Oblt.z.S. / Kptlt. Hans Leilich; 6 May 1943 – March 1945; Oblt.z.S. Heinz Schäffer; March – 17 August 1945
- Operations: 1 patrol: 2 May – 17 August 1945
- Victories: None

German submarine U-977 was a Type VIIC U-boat of Nazi Germany's Kriegsmarine that attempted to escape to Argentina after the end of World War II in Europe, but on arrival its crew were arrested, and on 17 August 1945 extradited to the US and Britain.

Like U-530, the Allies questioned the crew about whether they had sunk the Brazilian cruiser Bahia or helped high-ranking Nazis escape.

== Design ==
German Type VIIC submarines were preceded by the shorter Type VIIB submarines.

U-977 was powered by two Germaniawerft F46 four-stroke, six-cylinder supercharged diesel engines while surfaced and two Brown, Boveri & Cie GG UB 720/8 double-acting electric motors while submerged. She had two shafts and two 1.23 m (4 ft) propellers.

U-977 had a complement of between 44 and 60 men.

=== Flak gun ===
U-977 mounted a single 3.7 cm Flakzwilling M42U gun on the rare LM 43U mount. The LM 43U mount was the final design of mount used on U-boats and is only known to be installed on (U-249, U-826, U-1023, U-1171, U-1305 and U-1306). The 3.7 cm Flak M42U was the marine version of the 3.7 cm Flak, used by the Kriegsmarine on Type VII and Type IX U-boats.

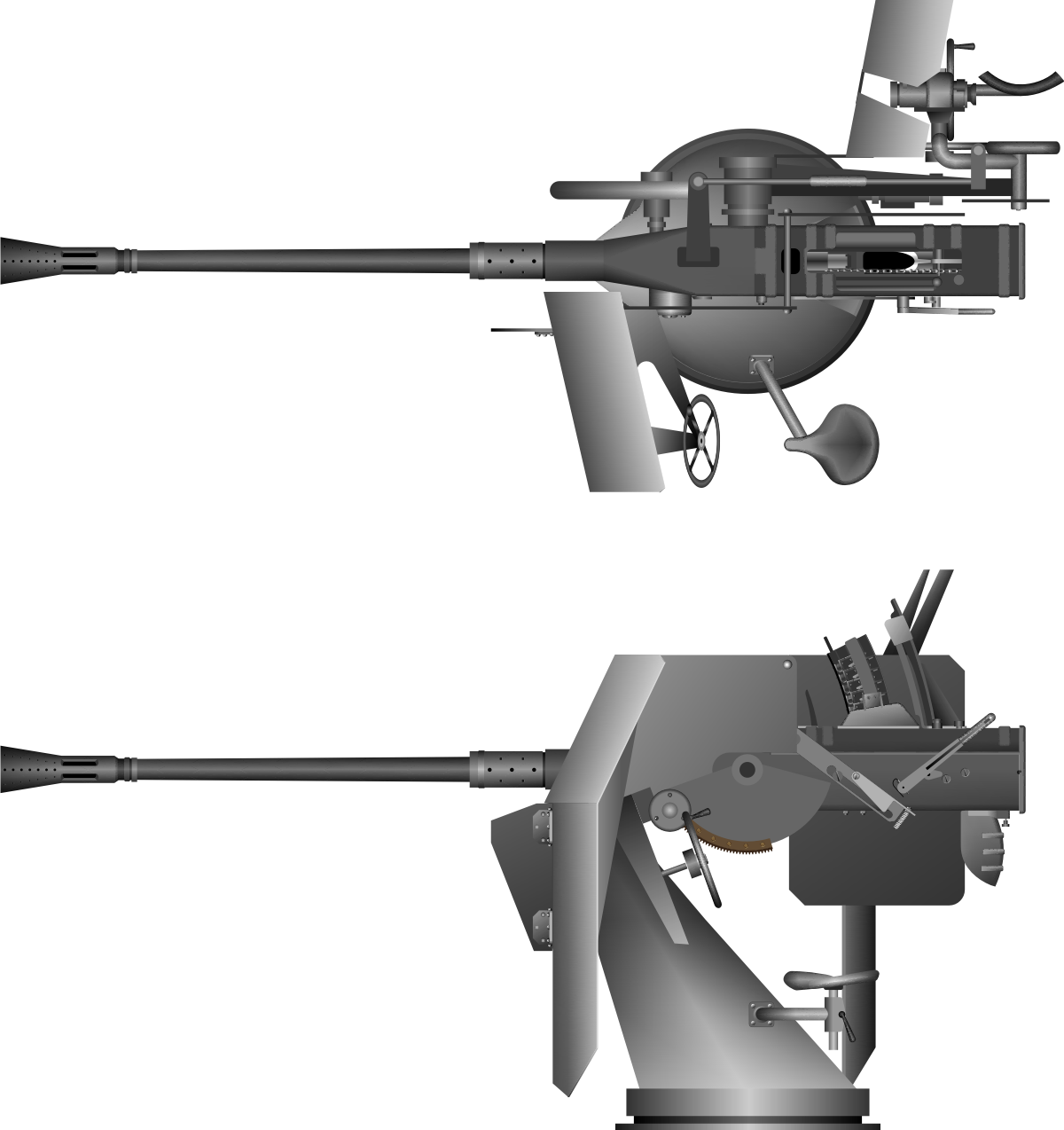
The single 3.7 cm Flak M42U gun on the LM 43U mount

== Service history ==
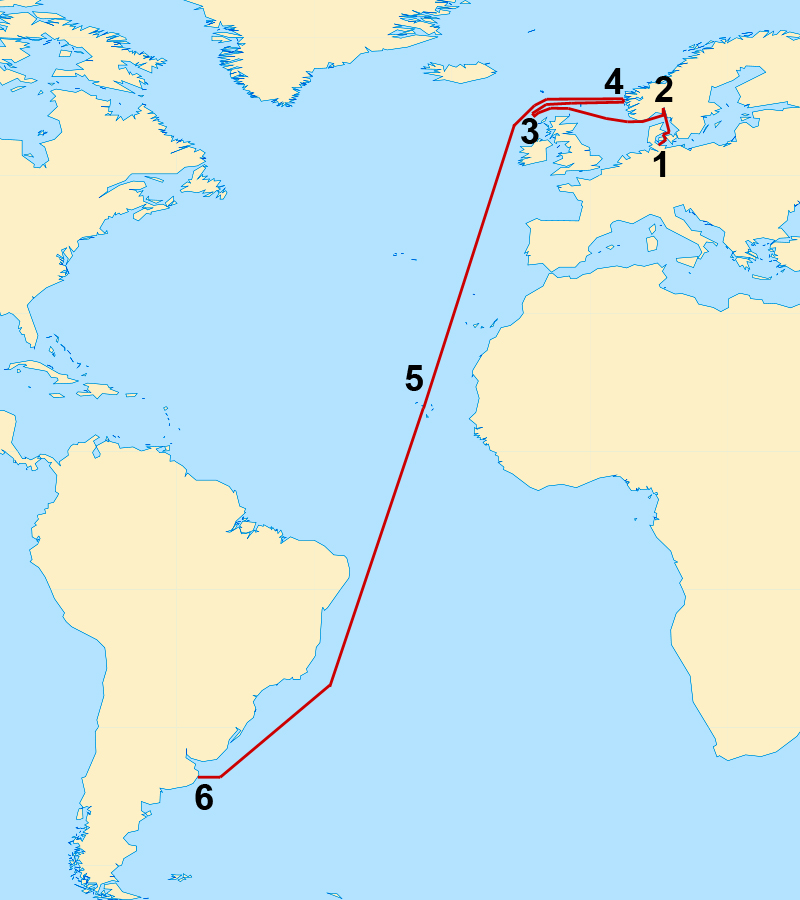
Route and stations of U-977: Sailing date in Kiel, April 1945 (1), intermediate station in Norway, 2 May 1945 (2), end of the war, 8 May 1945 (3), return to Norway and start of the submerged passage, 10 May 1945 (4), end of the submerged passage and touch at the Cape Verde Islands, July 1945 (5), arriving in Mar del Plata, Argentina, 17 August 1945 (6)

U-977 was launched on 31 March 1943. She was used in training and made no war patrols during her first two years of service. On 2 May 1945 she was sent on her first war patrol, sailing from Kristiansand, Norway, commanded by Oberleutnant zur See Heinz Schäffer (1921–1979). Schäffer's orders were to enter the British port of Southampton and sink any shipping there. This would have been a very dangerous assignment for a Type VII boat. When Admiral Dönitz ordered all attack submarines to stand down on 5 May 1945, U-977 was outbound north of Scotland.

=== Voyage to Argentina ===
Oblt.z.S. Schäffer decided to sail to Argentina rather than surrender. During later interrogation, Schäffer said his main reason was a German propaganda broadcast by Goebbels, which claimed that the Allies' Morgenthau Plan would turn Germany into a "goat pasture" and that all German men would be "enslaved and sterilized". Other factors were recollection of the poor conditions and long delays in repatriation that German POWs suffered at the end of World War I, and the hope of better living conditions in Argentina, which had a large German community.

Schäffer offered the married crewmen the option of going ashore in Europe. Sixteen chose to do so and were landed from dinghies on Holsnøy island near Bergen on 10 May.

U-977 then sailed to Argentina. Schäffer's version of the voyage states that from 10 May to 14 July 1945 she made a continuous submerged Schnorchel passage, "at 66 days the second longest in the war [sic - Germany had surrendered] (after U-978's 68 days)".

After the submarine landed in Argentina and the crew were extradited to the United States, the U.S. Navy (USN) interrogated the crew and issued a report on 19 September 1945. The report does not mention a 66-day submerged voyage, but states that U-977 "made for the Iceland Passage on course 300° [that is, northwest by west] diving once on sighting a plane and once on sighting a ship; she was also DF'd many times late in May". (This could also mean traveling at snorkel depth and then diving on contact; possible translation errors during interrogations.)

According to the Navy report, the submarine stopped in the Cape Verde Islands for a short break, then completed the trip traveling on the surface using one engine. Crossing the equator on 23 July, she arrived in Mar del Plata, Argentina on 17 August after 99 days at sea from Bergen and a voyage of 14,157 km (7,644 nmi, 8,797 mi). These points agree with Schäffer's report that he stopped at Cape Verde Islands for a short break and crossed the equator on 23 or 24 July 1945.

Schäffer said that, after the short Cape Verde break, they completed the rest of the trip to Mar del Plata alternately on the surface and submerged.

After surrendering to the Argentine authorities, as had happened to the crew of U-530, they were extradited to the US where they responded to the charge of having torpedoed the Brazilian cruiser Bahia, and then to the UK, where they faced accusations that they had landed Nazi leaders in Argentina before surrendering. Schäffer was released in 1947. U-977, like U-530, was seized by the US Navy and sunk during naval firing exercises, in its case in 1946, when it was used as a target. Both U-boats have led to legends, apocryphal stories and conspiracy theories about transporting escaping Nazi leaders (such as Adolf Hitler) and/or Nazi gold to South America, or making a secret voyage to Antarctica.

== In the arts ==
Schäffer later wrote a book: U-977 – 66 Tage unter Wasser ("U-977 – 66 Days Under Water"), the first postwar memoir by a former U-boat officer. It was published in 1952, and was translated into English under the title U-Boat 977.

A documentary film U-977 - 66 Days Under Water directed by Nadine Poulain, Schäffer's granddaughter, was in the final stages of production in 2014.

Afterlight Comics published a horror graphic novel in 2025, "The Passenger of the U-977", which adds a supernatural element to why the U-boat was submerged for 66 days during its journey to Argentina. "The war is over, but the horror is only beginning..."

== See also ==
- History of Mar del Plata
- Argentina during World War II

== Bibliography ==
- Busch, Rainer; Röll, Hans-Joachim (1999). German U-boat commanders of World War II : a biographical dictionary. Translated by Brooks, Geoffrey. London, Annapolis, Md: Greenhill Books, Naval Institute Press. ISBN 1-55750-186-6.
- Busch, Rainer; Röll, Hans-Joachim (1999). Deutsche U-Boot-Verluste von September 1939 bis Mai 1945 [German U-boat losses from September 1939 to May 1945]. Der U-Boot-Krieg (in German). Vol. IV. Hamburg, Berlin, Bonn: Mittler. ISBN 3-8132-0514-2.
- Gröner, Erich; Jung, Dieter; Maass, Martin (1991). German Warships 1815–1945, U-boats and Mine Warfare Vessels. Vol. 2. Translated by Thomas, Keith; Magowan, Rachel. London: Conway Maritime Press. ISBN 0-85177-593-4.
- Juan Salinas & Carlos De Nápoli (2002) Ultramar Sur: la última operación secreta del Tercer Reich ("South Overseas: the last secret operation of Third Reich") (in Spanish) Grupo Editorial Norma ISBN 9789875450752
- Kittel & Graf (2015) The History of U-Boot Edizione R.E.I. ISBN 9782372971768
- Paterson, Lawrence (2009) Black Flag: The Surrender of Germany's U-Boat Forces on Land and at Sea Seaforth Publishing ISBN 9781848320376
- Schäffer, Heinz (2006). El Secreto del U-977. Buenos Aires: Editorial Hisma. ISBN 987-22996-0-9.
- Schäffer, Heinz, Leonce Peillard Der U-Boot-Krieg 1999 ISBN 3-453-14825-8 (In German)
- Schäffer, Heinz, U-Boat 977: The U-Boat That Escaped to Argentina 2005 ISBN 1-84145-027-8 (First published in Germany in 1952 as U-977 – 66 Tage unter Wasser)
