= German submarine U-480 =

German World War II submarine

History

Nazi Germany
- Name: U-480
- Ordered: 10 April 1941
- Builder: Deutsche Werke, Kiel
- Yard number: 311
- Laid down: 8 December 1942
- Launched: 14 August 1943
- Commissioned: 6 October 1943
- Fate: Sunk between 29 January and 20 February 1945 in minefield "Brazier D2" in the English Channel, with the loss of the entire crew of 48.

General characteristics
- Class & type: Type VIIC submarine
- Displacement: 769 tonnes (757 long tons) surfaced; 871 t (857 long tons) submerged
- Length: 67.23 m (220 ft 7 in) o/a; 50.50 m (165 ft 8 in) pressure hull
- Beam: 6.20 m (20 ft 4 in) o/a; 4.70 m (15 ft 5 in) pressure hull
- Height: 9.60 m (31 ft 6 in)
- Draught: 4.74 m (15 ft 7 in)
- Installed power: 2,800–3,200 PS (2,100–2,400 kW; 2,800–3,200 bhp) (diesels); 750 PS (550 kW; 740 shp) (electric)
- Propulsion: 2 shafts; 2 × diesel engines; 2 × electric motors
- Speed: 17.7 kn (32.8 km/h; 20.4 mph) surfaced; 7.6 knots (14.1 km/h; 8.7 mph) submerged
- Range: 8,500 nmi (15,700 km; 9,800 mi) at 10 knots (19 km/h; 12 mph) surfaced; 80 nmi (150 km; 92 mi) at 4 knots (7.4 km/h; 4.6 mph) submerged
- Test depth: 230 m (750 ft); Crush depth: 250–295 m (820–968 ft)
- Complement: 4 officers, 40–56 enlisted
- Armament: 5 × 53.3 cm (21 in) torpedo tubes (four bow, one stern); 14 × torpedoes or 26 TMA mines; 1 × 3.7 cm (1.5 in) Flak M42 AA gun; 2 × twin 2 cm (0.79 in) C/30 anti-aircraft guns

Service record
- Part of: 5th U-boat Flotilla; 6 October 1943 – 31 May 1944; 9th U-boat Flotilla; 1 June – 14 October 1944; 11th U-boat Flotilla; 15 October 1944 – 29 January 1945
- Identification codes: M 53 621
- Commanders: Oblt.z.S. Hans-Joachim Förster; 6 October 1943 – 29 January 1945
- Operations: 3 patrols: 1st patrol: 7 June – 7 July 1944; 2nd patrol: 3 August – 4 October 1944; 3rd patrol: 6 – 29 January 1945
- Victories: 2 merchant ships sunk (12,846 GRT); 2 warships sunk (1,775 tons)

German submarine U-480 was an experimental Kriegsmarine Type VIIC U-boat of World War II.

Considered by many to be the first stealth submarine, it was equipped with a special rubber skin of anechoic tiles (codenamed Alberich, after the German mythological dwarf, who had the ability to become invisible), that made it difficult to detect with the Allies' ASDIC (sonar). She was one of about six Type VIIs so equipped.

The U-boat was laid down in the Deutsche Werke in Kiel as yard number 311 on 8 December 1942, launched on 14 August 1943 and commissioned on 6 October 1943 under Oberleutnant zur See Hans-Joachim Förster. U-480 carried out three war patrols, all under Förster's command. Because of its coating, the boat was sent to the heavily defended English Channel.

== Design ==
German Type VIIC submarines were preceded by the shorter Type VIIB submarines. U-480 had a displacement of 769 tonnes (757 long tons) when at the surface and 871 tonnes (857 long tons) while submerged. She had a total length of 67.10 m (220 ft 2 in), a pressure hull length of 50.50 m (165 ft 8 in), a beam of 6.20 m (20 ft 4 in), a height of 9.60 m (31 ft 6 in), and a draught of 4.74 m (15 ft 7 in). The submarine was powered by two Germaniawerft F46 four-stroke, six-cylinder supercharged diesel engines producing a total of 2,800 to 3,200 metric horsepower (2,060 to 2,350 kW; 2,760 to 3,160 shp) for use while surfaced, two Siemens-Schuckert GU 343/38–8 double-acting electric motors producing a total of 750 metric horsepower (550 kW; 740 shp) for use while submerged. She had two shafts and two 1.23 m (4 ft) propellers. The boat was capable of operating at depths of up to 230 metres (750 ft).

The submarine had a maximum surface speed of 17.7 knots (32.8 km/h; 20.4 mph) and a maximum submerged speed of 7.6 knots (14.1 km/h; 8.7 mph). When submerged, the boat could operate for 80 nautical miles (150 km; 92 mi) at 4 knots (7.4 km/h; 4.6 mph); when surfaced, she could travel 8,500 nautical miles (15,700 km; 9,800 mi) at 10 knots (19 km/h; 12 mph). U-480 was fitted with five 53.3 cm (21 in) torpedo tubes (four fitted at the bow and one at the stern), fourteen torpedoes, one 3.7 cm (1.5 in) Flak M42 and two twin 2 cm (0.79 in) C/30 anti-aircraft guns. The boat had a complement of between forty-four and sixty.

== Anechoic coating ==
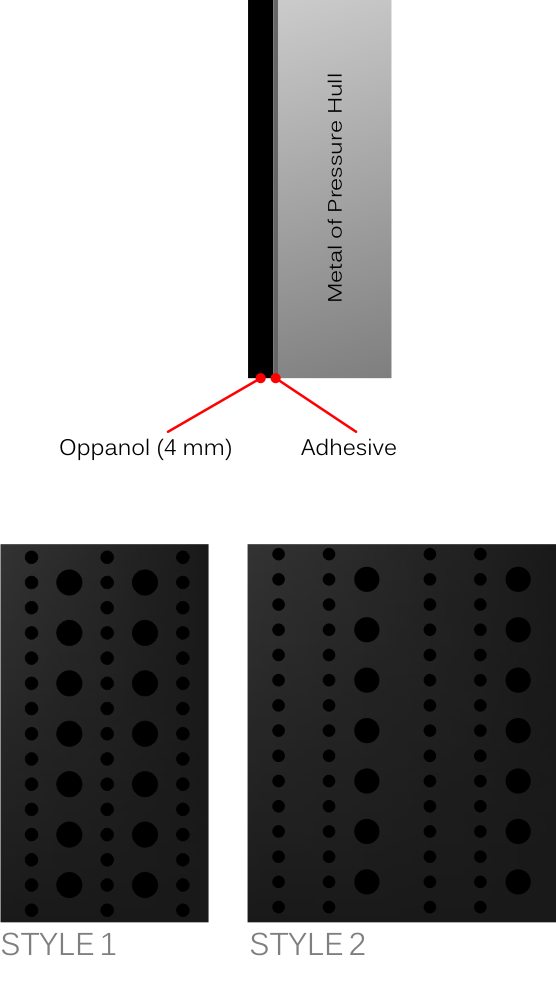
A close-up view of an Alberich tile, illustrating patterns of multiple holes with different diameters

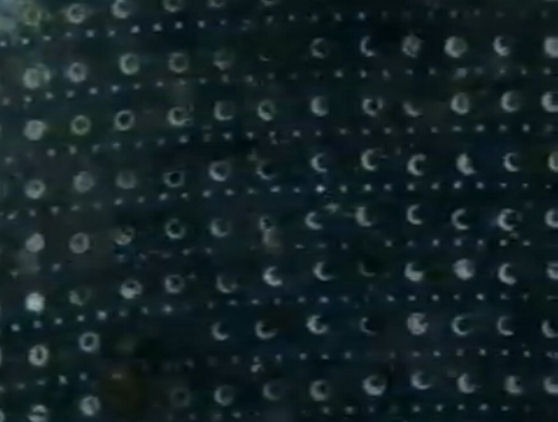
Alberich tiles as they appear on U-480

Rubber foil containing air holes can be used to reduce the sound waves reflected under water by structures when foil thickness is small by comparison with the sound wavelength in water, providing a low reflectivity over a narrow frequency range.

The leading German acoustician Erwin Meyer and his team developed a 4-millimetre (0.16 in) thick tile consisting of two 2-millimetre thick foils of synthetic rubber. The anechoic tile reduced echoes to 15% in the 10 to 18 kHz range. This frequency range matched the operating range of the early ASDIC active sonar used by the Allies. The ASDIC types 123, 123A, 144 and 145 all operated in the 14 to 22 kHz range. However, this degradation in echo reflection was not uniform at all diving depths due to the voids being compressed by the water pressure. An additional benefit of the coating was it acted as a sound dampener, containing the U-boat's own engine noises.

The rubber contained a series of holes, which helped break up sound waves. There were problems with this technology: the material performed differently at different depths, due to the holes being compressed by water pressure, and securing the tiles to the submarine's hull required a special adhesive and careful application.

The first tests were conducted in 1940, but it was not used operationally until 1944, with U-480. According to the Naked Science television episode "Stealth Submarine", U-480 had a perforated inner rubber layer covered by a smooth outer one. This formed air pockets with the right separation and size to muffle sonar waves.

Other U-boats with the anechoic tiles coating include: U-11, U-485, U-486, U-1105, U-1106, U-1107, U-1304, U-1306, U-1308, U-4704, U-4708 and U-4709.

With the exception of U-480 and U-486, none of the other German submarines of this type with this equipment was lost in combat.

== Service history ==
On its first patrol, the boat was attacked by a Canadian PBY Catalina flying boat of 162 Squadron RCAF, piloted by Laurance Sherman. The aircraft was shot down.

On the second patrol, Förster departed from Brest in occupied France on 3 August 1944, and sank two warships and two merchantmen:

For his success, Förster was awarded the Knight's Cross on 18 October 1944.

== Fate ==
U-480 left Trondheim, Norway, on 6 January 1945 for its third and last patrol. It did not return. In 1997, the wreck of a Type VIIC U-boat was discovered by accident by divers at 50°22′4″N 1°44′10″W, 20 kilometres (12 mi) southwest of the Isle of Wight. The following year, it was identified as U-480 by nautical archaeologist Innes McCartney. Subsequent research by the Naval Historical Branch established that it had fallen victim to the secret minefield 'Brazier D2' sometime between 29 January and 20 February. A mine had damaged the stern of U-480, sending it to the bottom 55 metres (180 ft) down. The entire crew of 48 was lost. Helmsman Horst Rösner only survived because he had been left behind in Norway for training.

== Summary of raiding history ==
Date	Ship Name	Nationality	Tonnage (Note: Merchant ship tonnages are in gross register tons. Military vessels are listed by tons displacement.)	Notes
21 August 1944	HMCS Alberni	Royal Canadian Navy	925	Flower-class corvette
22 August 1944	HMS Loyalty	Royal Navy	850	Algerine-class minesweeper
23 August 1944	Fort Yale	United Kingdom	7,134	Sailing in convoy ETC-72
25 August 1944	Orminster	United Kingdom	5,712	

== Bibliography ==
- Busch, Rainer; Röll, Hans-Joachim (1999). German U-boat commanders of World War II : a biographical dictionary. Translated by Brooks, Geoffrey. London, Annapolis, Md: Greenhill Books, Naval Institute Press. ISBN 1-55750-186-6.
- Busch, Rainer; Röll, Hans-Joachim (1999). Deutsche U-Boot-Verluste von September 1939 bis Mai 1945 [German U-boat losses from September 1939 to May 1945]. Der U-Boot-Krieg (in German). Vol. IV. Hamburg, Berlin, Bonn: Mittler. ISBN 3-8132-0514-2.
- Gröner, Erich; Jung, Dieter; Maass, Martin (1991). U-boats and Mine Warfare Vessels. German Warships 1815–1945. Vol. 2. Translated by Thomas, Keith; Magowan, Rachel. London: Conway Maritime Press. ISBN 0-85177-593-4.
- McCartney, Innes (2002). Lost patrols : submarine wrecks of the English Channel. Penzance: Periscope. ISBN 978-1-904381-04-4.
