= German submarine U-1105 =

German World War II submarine

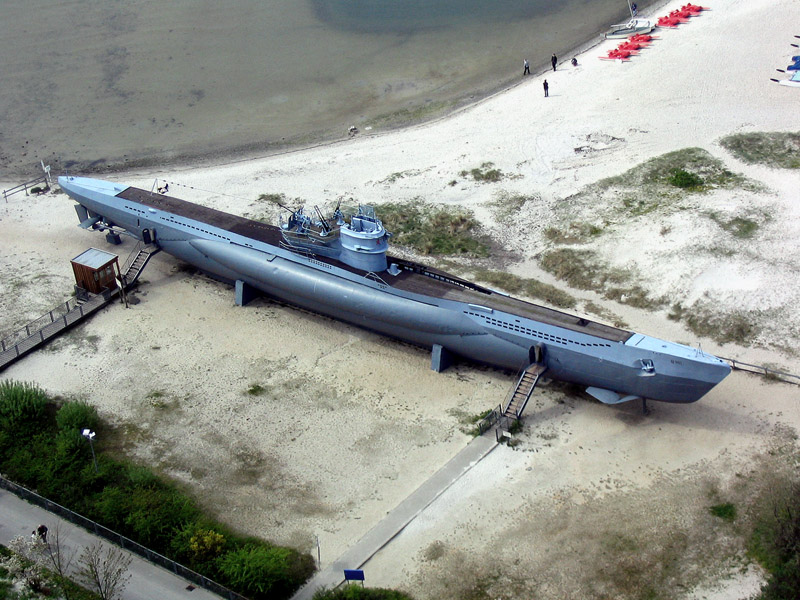
- U-995, last remaining Type VIIC U-boat, sister to U-1105

History

Nazi Germany
- Name: U-1105
- Ordered: 14 October 1941
- Builder: Nordseewerke, Emden
- Yard number: 227
- Laid down: 6 July 1943
- Launched: 20 April 1944
- Commissioned: 3 June 1944
- Fate: Surrendered on 10 May 1945

United Kingdom
- Name: N-16
- Acquired: 10 May 1945
- Commissioned: 29 June 1945
- Out of service: 11 February 1946
- Nickname(s): Black Panther
- Fate: Transferred to the US Navy in 1946

United States
- Name: U-1105
- Acquired: 1946
- Fate: Sunk on 19 September 1949

General characteristics
- Type: Type VIIC/41 submarine
- Displacement: 759 tonnes (747 long tons) surfaced; 860 t (846 long tons) submerged
- Length: 67.10 m (220 ft 2 in) o/a; 50.50 m (165 ft 8 in) pressure hull
- Beam: 6.20 m (20 ft 4 in) o/a; 4.70 m (15 ft 5 in) pressure hull
- Height: 9.60 m (31 ft 6 in)
- Draught: 4.74 m (15 ft 7 in)
- Installed power: 2,800–3,200 PS (2,100–2,400 kW; 2,800–3,200 bhp) (diesels); 750 PS (550 kW; 740 shp) (electric)
- Propulsion: 2 shafts; 2 × diesel engines; 2 × electric motors
- Speed: 17.7 knots (32.8 km/h; 20.4 mph) surfaced; 7.6 knots (14.1 km/h; 8.7 mph) submerged
- Range: 8,500 nmi (15,700 km; 9,800 mi) at 10 knots (19 km/h; 12 mph) surfaced; 80 nmi (150 km; 92 mi) at 4 knots (7.4 km/h; 4.6 mph) submerged
- Test depth: 250 m (820 ft)
- Complement: 44-52 officers and enlisted men
- Armament: 5 × 53.3 cm (21 in) torpedo tubes (4 bow, 1 stern); 1 × 8.8 cm (3.5 in)/45 deck gun (220 rounds)

Service record (Kriegsmarine)
- Identification codes: M 50 444
- Commanders: Oblt.z.S. Hans-Joachim Schwarz; 3 June 1944 – 10 May 1945
- Operations: 1 patrol: 12 April – 10 May 1945
- Victories: 1 warship total loss (1,300 tons)
- U-1105 BLACK Panther (Type VIIC German Submarine)
- U.S. National Register of Historic Places
- Location within Maryland
- Nearest city: Piney Point, Maryland
- Coordinates: 38°8′10″N 76°33′10″W
- Area: less than one acre
- Built: 1944
- Architect: Nordseewerke Shipyard
- Architectural style: Submarine Type VIIC
- NRHP reference No.: 00001602
- Added to NRHP: 11 January 2001

German submarine U-1105, a Type VII-C/41 U-boat of Nazi Germany's Kriegsmarine, was built at the Nordseewerke Shipyard, Emden, Germany, and commissioned on 3 June 1944. Oberleutnant zur See Hans-Joachim Schwarz was given command. He would command U-1105 for the remainder of the war.

== Design ==
German Type VIIC/41 submarines were preceded by the heavier Type VIIC submarines. U-1105 had a displacement of 759 tonnes (747 long tons) when at the surface and 860 tonnes (850 long tons) while submerged. She had a total length of 67.10 m (220 ft 2 in), a pressure hull length of 50.50 m (165 ft 8 in), a beam of 6.20 m (20 ft 4 in), a height of 9.60 m (31 ft 6 in), and a draught of 4.74 m (15 ft 7 in). The submarine was powered by two Germaniawerft F46 four-stroke, six-cylinder supercharged diesel engines producing a total of 2,800 to 3,200 metric horsepower (2,060 to 2,350 kW; 2,760 to 3,160 shp) for use while surfaced, two Siemens-Schuckert GU 343/38-8 double-acting electric motors producing a total of 750 metric horsepower (550 kW; 740 shp) for use while submerged. She had two shafts and two 1.23 m (4 ft) propellers. The boat was capable of operating at depths of up to 230 metres (750 ft).

The submarine had a maximum surface speed of 17.7 knots (32.8 km/h; 20.4 mph) and a maximum submerged speed of 7.6 knots (14.1 km/h; 8.7 mph). When submerged, the boat could operate for 80 nautical miles (150 km; 92 mi) at 4 knots (7.4 km/h; 4.6 mph); when surfaced, she could travel 8,500 nautical miles (15,700 km; 9,800 mi) at 10 knots (19 km/h; 12 mph). U-1105 was fitted with five 53.3 cm (21 in) torpedo tubes (four fitted at the bow and one at the stern), fourteen torpedoes, one 8.8 cm (3.46 in) SK C/35 naval gun, 220 rounds, and an anti-aircraft gun. The boat had a complement of between forty-four and sixty.

== Armament ==
=== FLAK weaponry ===
U-1105 was mounted with a single 3.7 cm Flakzwilling M43U gun on the LM 42U mount. The LM 42U mount was the most common mount used with the 3.7 cm Flak M42U. The 3.7 cm Flak M42U was the marine version of the 3.7 cm Flak used by the Kriegsmarine on Type VII and Type IX U-boats. U-1105 was mounted with two 2cm Flak C38 in a M 43U Zwilling mount with short folding shield on the upper Wintergarten. The M 43U mount was used on a number of U-boats (U-190, U-250, U-278, U-337, U-475, U-853, U-1023, U-1058, U-1109, U-1165, and U-1306).

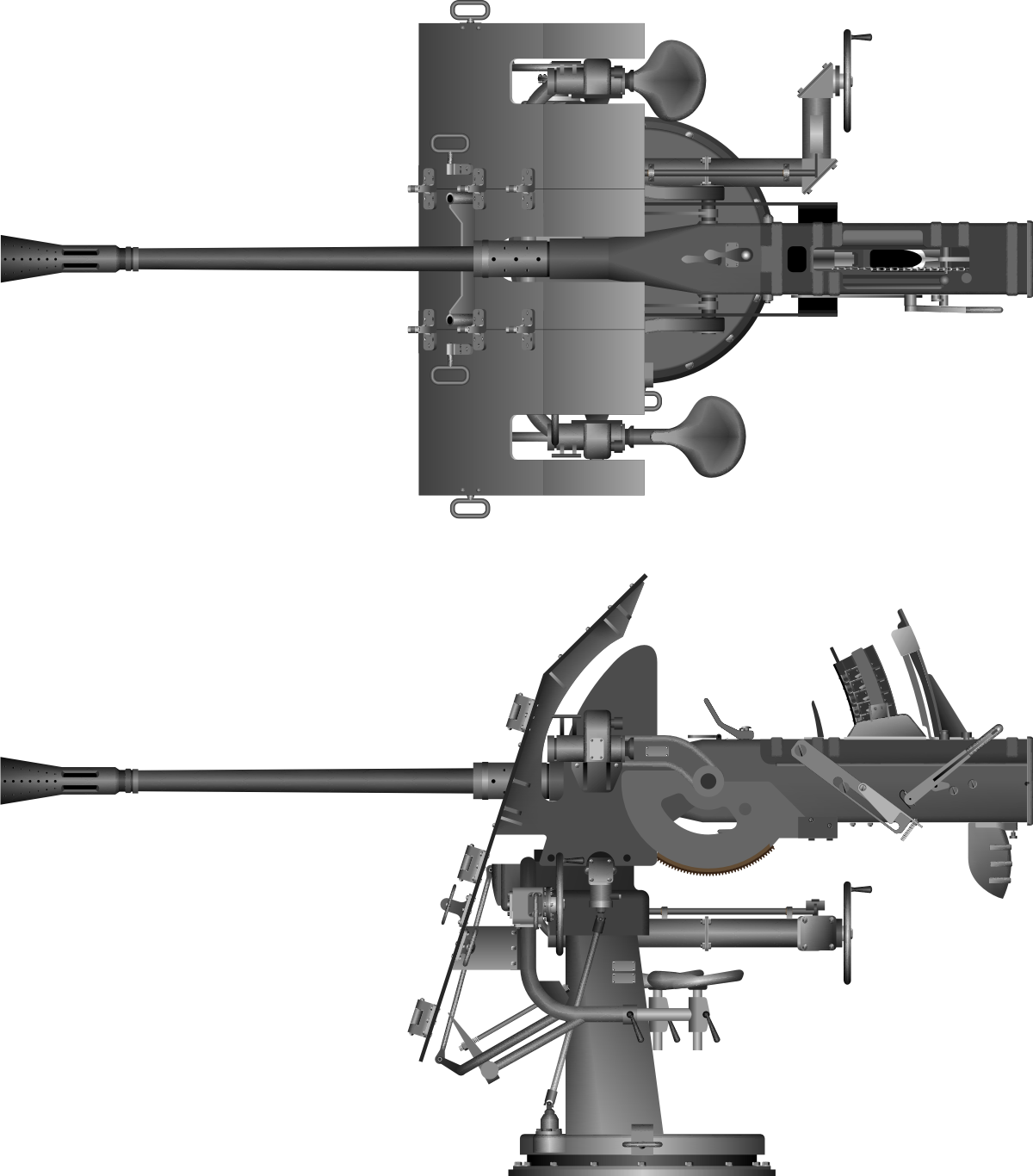
A single 3.7 cm Flak M42U gun on the LM 42U mount.

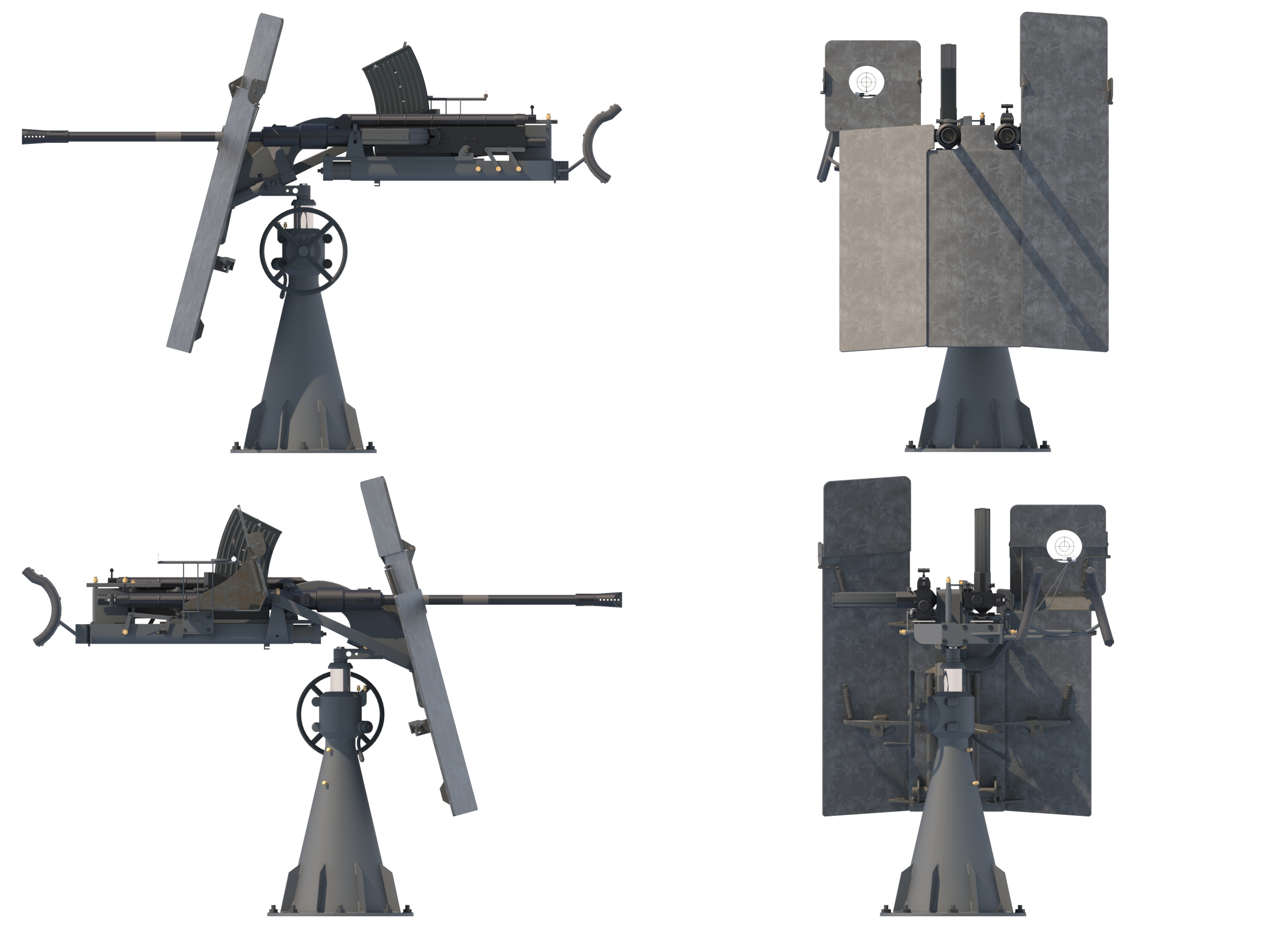
2 cm Flak C38 in a M 43U Zwilling mount with short folding shield.

== Sensors ==
=== Passive sonar ===
U-1105 was one of only ten Type VIIC's to be fitted with a Balkongerät (literally 'Balcony apparatus or equipment'). The Balkongerät was used on U-boats (U-682, U-788, U-799, U-997, U-1021, U-1172, U-1306, U-1307 and U-1308). The Balkongerät was standard on the Type XXI and the Type XXIII. Nonetheless, it was also fitted to several Type IXs and one Type X. The Balkongerät was an improved version of Gruppenhorchgerät (GHG) (group listening device). The GHG had 24 hydrophones, the Balkongerät had 48 hydrophones and improved electronics, which enabled more accurate readings to be taken.

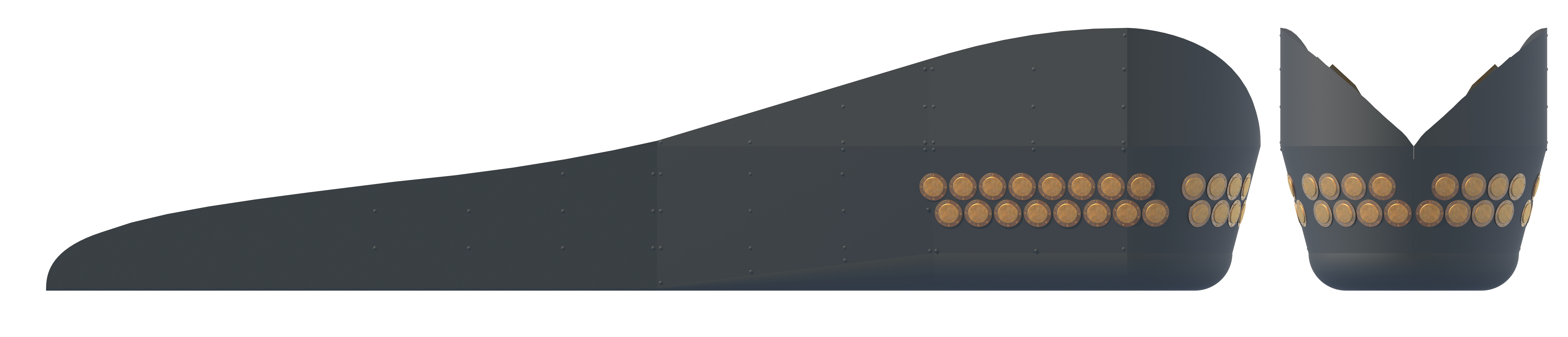
The outside view of the German design of Balcongerät installed on Type VIIC's

== Service history ==
=== Kriegsmarine ===
It was one of less than ten submarines that the Germans outfitted with experimental synthetic rubber skin of anechoic tiles designed to counter Allied sonar devices. Codenamed "Alberich," after a sorcerer from ancient Norse mythology, this top-secret rubber coating process ultimately contributed to the ship's survival under extreme combat conditions and earned it the name "Black Panther." For this reason, a black panther sprawled across the top of the globe was painted on U-1105's conning tower. U-boats with Alberich coating include: Type IIB – U-11; Type VIIC – U-480, U-485 and U-486; Type VIIC/41 – U-1105, U-1106, U-1107, U-1304, U-1306 and U-1308; Type XXIII – U-4704, U-4708 and U-4709.

After trials in the Baltic Sea and final outfitting in Wilhelmshaven, the submarine began patrolling Allied convoy routes near Blackrock, Ireland in the spring of 1945. In April, U-1105 escaped detection by an Allied destroyer patrol. Days later, the U-boat detected three British destroyers that were part of the Second Division of the 21st Escort Group. The submarine fired two acoustic torpedoes at a range of 2000 meters and then dove to 100 meters to escape a counterattack. Fifty seconds passed before the first torpedo struck, with the second hitting just moments later. Thirty-two crewmen from U-1105's victim, HMS Redmill, were lost. The Allied search for U-1105 and the search for Redmill's survivors began immediately. The submarine, unable to maintain its 330-foot depth, sank to the bottom at 570 feet, remaining motionless. For the next 31 hours, the Allied squadron searched for the U-boat without success. U-1105 evaded detection for the remainder of World War II.

On 4 May 1945, U-1105 received the last order from Großadmiral Karl Dönitz: the war is over. Ironically, the submarine surrendered to the 21st Escort Group, the same escort group it attacked just a few weeks earlier. Ordered to the surface and intercepted by the Sunderland "NS-V" of No. 201 Squadron RAF which then escorted it, the submarine proceeded to the Allied base at Loch Eriboll, Scotland on 10 May 1945 to surrender.

=== Royal Navy ===
Though still operated by her German crew, U-1105 was re-designated as the Royal Navy submarine N-16 and sailed under armed frigate and air escort along with other surrendered U-boats, through the North Minch to the British naval base at Lochalsh, then to Lisahally, Northern Ireland. Given a British caretaker crew she sat at Lisshally for several months before she was turned over to the United States as a war prize for study of its unique synthetic rubber skin.

=== United States Navy ===
In 1946, re-designated U-1105, the U-boat arrived in Portsmouth, New Hampshire. The Naval Research Laboratory in Washington, D.C., and Massachusetts Institute of Technology's Acoustic Laboratory in Cambridge, Massachusetts, conducted research on its unique rubber-tiled skin. After the research was completed, the boat was towed to Solomon's Island, Maryland for explosives testing.

USS Salvager and USS Windlass were assigned to tow U-1105 into Chesapeake Bay where she was temporarily sunk. Salvage and towing tests were conducted from 10 to 25 August 1946. Moored on 29 September 1946 to allow pontoons to be fixed to her sides, U-1105 underwent another series of salvage and towing tests until 18 November 1946, when she was sunk off Point No Point Light, Maryland and buoys were left to mark the spot.

In the summer of 1949 U-1105 was raised again, towed into the Potomac River and anchored off Piney Point, Maryland, for preparations for her final demolition. On 19 September 1949, a 250-pound (110 kg) MK.6 depth charge was detonated 30 feet (9.1 m) from U-1105. After being lifted out of the water, she went down one last time in more than 91 feet (28 m) of water, landing upright on the river bottom, her pressure hull cracked open by the explosion all the way around to the keel. Little evidence was left to mark the wreck, so for the next 36 years the submarine was lost to history.

== The wreck ==
On 29 June 1985, the wreck of U-1105 was discovered by a team of sport divers led by Uwe Lovas, approximately one mile west of Piney Point, Maryland, at 38°08′10″N 76°33′10″W. In November 1994, it was designated as Maryland's first historic shipwreck preserve. The program, the first of its kind in the state, was designed to promote the preservation of historic shipwreck sites while making them accessible to the general public.

At the wreck site, the conning tower rises to within 68 feet of the surface. The wood covered main deck fore and aft of the conning tower is occasionally exposed by the drifting silt beds. The wreck is well preserved, and largely intact. Seasonally, thick layers of marine growth appear and then disappear on the site, often covering structural features. Between April and December, a large blue and white mooring buoy is anchored about 70 feet (21 m) from the wreck, while a small, orange ball float is anchored to the stump of the forward (air-search) periscope.

The site is maintained for the Maryland Historical Trust by the Battle of the Atlantic Research and Expedition Group (BAREG.org), and was placed on the National Register of Historic Places in 2001.

== Summary of raiding history ==
Date	Ship name	Nationality	Tonnage (Note: Merchant ship tonnages are in gross register tons. Military vessels are listed by tons displacement.)	Fate
27 April 1945	HMS Redmill	Royal Navy	1,300	Total loss

== Bibliography ==
- Busch, Rainer; Röll, Hans-Joachim (1999). German U-boat commanders of World War II: a biographical dictionary. Translated by Brooks, Geoffrey. London, Annapolis, Md: Greenhill Books, Naval Institute Press. ISBN 1-55750-186-6.
- Busch, Rainer; Röll, Hans-Joachim (1999). Deutsche U-Boot-Verluste von September 1939 bis Mai 1945 [German U-boat losses from September 1939 to May 1945]. Der U-Boot-Krieg (in German). Vol. IV. Hamburg; Berlin; Bonn: Mittler. ISBN 3-8132-0514-2.
- Gröner, Erich; Jung, Dieter; Maass, Martin (1991). German Warships 1815–1945, U-boats and Mine Warfare Vessels. Vol. 2. Translated by Thomas, Keith; Magowan, Rachel. London: Conway Maritime Press. ISBN 0-85177-593-4.
