= Eddy-class tanker =

Class of eight replenishment oilers of the Royal Fleet Auxiliary

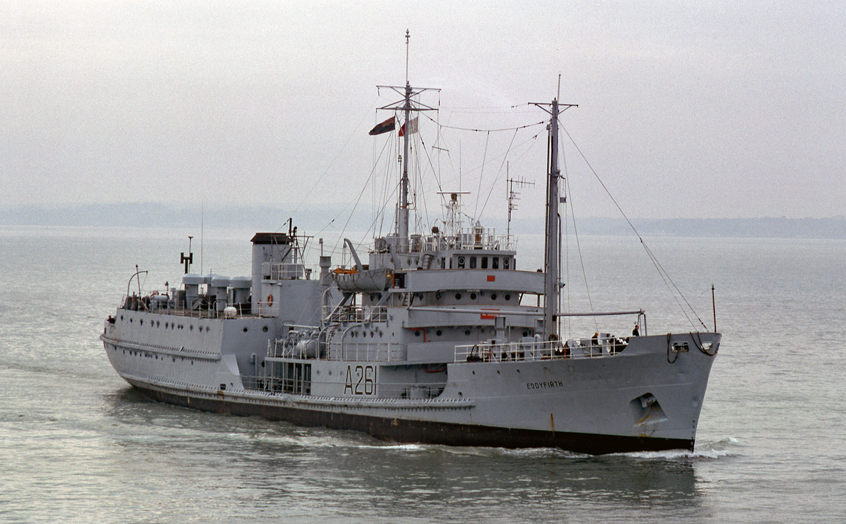
- RFA Eddyfirth

Class overview
- Name: Eddy class
- Builders: Caledon Shipbuilding & Engineering Company; Blythswood Shipbuilding Company Limited; Blyth Shipbuilding Company; Lobnitz
- Operators: Royal Fleet Auxiliary
- In service: 1951–1981
- Planned: 10
- Completed: 8
- Canceled: 2
- Retired: 8

General characteristics
- Type: Coastal tanker
- Tonnage: 2,200 long tons deadweight (DWT)
- Length: 286 ft 5 in (87.3 m)
- Beam: 46 ft 4 in (14.1 m)
- Draft: 17 ft 3.5 in (5.3 m)
- Propulsion: 3-cylinder triple expansion steam engine
- Speed: 12 knots (22 km/h; 14 mph)
- Complement: 38

The Eddy-class coastal tankers were a series of eight replenishment oilers used by the Royal Fleet Auxiliary (RFA), the naval auxiliary fleet of the United Kingdom. They were built from 1951 to 1953 tasked with transporting and providing fuel and other liquids to Royal Navy vessels and stations around the world.

== History ==
The Eddy class formed a component of the Royal Fleet Auxiliary's post-World War II construction initiative, specifically intended for Fleet Attendant responsibilities at naval installations globally. Initially, the design projected the construction of ten vessels within this class; however, two were ultimately scrapped during the building phase. Consequently, the remaining eight ships became effectively obsolete upon completion, as the advancements achieved in Replenishment at Sea methods during the Second World War rendered their original purpose outdated.

Most of the class had relatively short service careers, although Eddyfirth remained in service until 1981. Several of the vessels were based at Gibraltar in the Mediterranean for most of their service years.

== Design ==
The vessels of this class possessed a cargo capacity of 1,650 long tons (1,680 t) and were designed to transport various fuels across four cargo tanks, which were operated by four cargo pumps. Additionally, these ships had the capability to carry two distinct grades of lubricating oil in specially designed tanks and could accommodate a limited quantity of dry cargo and some ammunition. The cargo areas were equipped with 2 x 3 long tons (3.0 t) and 2 x 1 long ton (1.0 t) derricks for cargo handling, rendering them exceptionally useful in smaller harbours or at anchorages. The Eddy class was manned by a crew of around thirty-eight individuals and offered adequate living accommodations relative to their dimensions.

== Construction ==
All eight ships constructed exhibited a similar appearance, although there were slight variations in tonnage and some minor design characteristics, which were contingent upon the shipyard where they were constructed.

The class was characterised by several typical features, which included a displacement of roughly 2,200 long tons (2,200 t) deadweight (DWT), a length of approximately 286 ft 5 in (87.3 m), a beam of approximately 46 ft 4 in (14.1 m), Draught: nearly 17 ft 3.5 in (5.3 m), with the propulsion consisting a 3-cylinder triple-expansion steam engine with a speed of about 12 knots (22 km/h; 14 mph).

== Ships ==
Name	Pennant	Builder	Laid down	Launched	Into service	Out of service	Reference
Eddybeach	A132	Caledon Shipbuilding & Engineering Company, Dundee	20 March 1950	24 May 1951	8 December 1951	27 May 1962	
Eddybay	A107	Caledon Shipbuilding & Engineering Company, Dundee	23 March 1951	29 November 1951	25 April 1952	9 November 1962	
Eddyreef	A202	Caledon Shipbuilding & Engineering Company, Dundee		28 May 1953	23 October 1953	1958	
Eddycliff	A190	Blythswood Shipbuilding Company Limited, Glasgow		25 August 1952	16 February 1953	August 1963	
Eddycreek	A258	Lobnitz, Renfrew		19 January 1953	11 September 1953	25 July 1960	
Eddyfirth	A261	Lobnitz, Renfrew	25 April 1952	10 September 1953	25 April 1954	1 April 1981	
Eddyrock	A198	Blyth Shipbuilding Company, Northumberland		16 December 1952	7 June 1953	27 June 1967	
Eddyness	A295	Blyth Shipbuilding Company, Northumberland		22 October 1953	11 October 1954	29 January 1963	
Eddycove	A205	Caledon Shipbuilding & Engineering Company, Dundee	Ordered 1951, cancelled 1952.				
Eddymull	A287	Lobnitz, Renfrew	Ordered 1951, cancelled 1952.				

== Decommissioning and fate ==
RFA Eddybeach was transformed into a fish processing vessel and subsequently renamed Mykinai, initially operating under the Greek flag and later under the Argentinian flag. RFA Eddybay was initially sold to Pounds Shipowners & Shipbreakers Ltd, located in Portsmouth, and subsequently resold to breakers in Belgium.

RFA Eddycreek was sold in November 1963. On Christmas Day 1963, during a storm, she ran aground. Subsequently refloated, she was sold to a shipbreaking yard in Leghorn in February 1964. RFA Eddyreef was towed to Willebroek in April 1964 for dismantling. RFA Eddycliff was transferred in 1966 to Greek ownership in Malta, subsequently modified into a fish processing vessel, and rebranded as Knossos.

RFA Eddyrock was transferred to commercial entities in Singapore on 27 June 1967 and subsequently renamed as Aletta in 1968. RFA Eddyness was listed for sale in Plymouth during November 1969. She was dismantled in Valencia, arriving there on 24 February 1970. RFA Eddyfirth was retired in April 1981 and subsequently sold to a shipbreaking company in Spain in January 1982. The dismantling process began in Seville on 28 March 1983.

== See also ==
- List of replenishment ships of the Royal Fleet Auxiliary
- T1 tanker US coastal tanker
- T2 tanker
- T3 Tanker
- Replenishment oiler
- Escambia-class replenishment oiler
