= HMS Loyalty (J217) =

Minesweeper of the Royal Navy

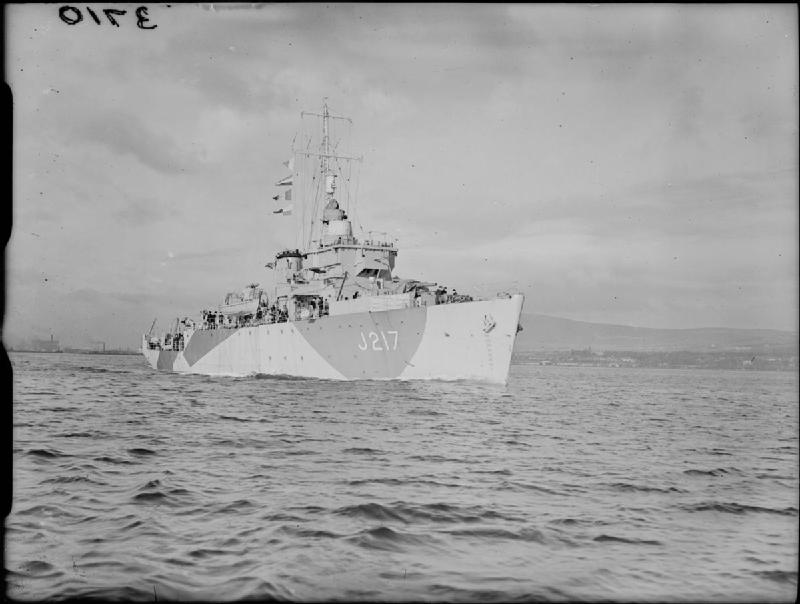

History

United Kingdom
- Name: HMS Rattler (until June 1943); HMS Loyalty (from June 1943)
- Builder: Harland and Wolff, Belfast
- Yard number: 1142
- Laid down: 14 April 1941
- Launched: 9 December 1942
- Completed: 22 April 1943
- Commissioned: 22 April 1943
- Identification: Pennant number J217
- Motto: "Fight for the King"
- Honours and awards: Normandy 1944
- Fate: Sunk on 22 August 1944
- Badge: On a Field barry wavy of six White and Blue, a sprig of three oak leaves, Gold

General characteristics
- Class & type: Algerine-class minesweeper
- Displacement: 850 tons
- Length: 225 ft (69 m)
- Beam: 35 ft 6 in (10.82 m)
- Propulsion: Geared turbines; two shafts; 2,000 ihp (1.5 MW)
- Complement: 85 men
- Armament: 1 × QF 4 in (102 mm) Mk V anti-aircraft gun; 4 × 20 mm guns (4x1)

HMS Loyalty was a turbine-powered Algerine-class minesweeper of the Royal Navy, formerly HMS Rattler . She served during the Second World War. Commissioned in 1943, Loyalty saw action off the coast of Normandy during the Allied assault there in 1944. While performing duties off the coast, the ship was torpedoed by a German submarine and sank.

== Design and description ==
The turbine-powered ships displaced 850 long tons (860 t) at standard load and 1,125 long tons (1,143 t) at deep load. The ship measured 225 feet (68.6 m) long overall with a beam of 35 feet 6 inches (10.8 m). The turbine group had a draught of 11 feet (3.4 m). The ships' complement consisted of 85 officers and ratings.

The ships had two Parsons geared steam turbines, each driving one shaft, using steam provided by two Admiralty three-drum boilers. The engines produced a total of 2,000 shaft horsepower (1,500 kW) and gave a maximum speed of 16.5 knots (30.6 km/h; 19.0 mph). The ships carried a maximum of 660 long tons (671 t) of fuel oil that gave them a range of 5,000 nautical miles (9,300 km; 5,800 mi) at 10 knots (19 km/h; 12 mph).

The Algerine class was armed with a QF 4 in (102 mm) Mk V anti-aircraft gun and four twin-gun mounts for Oerlikon 20 mm cannon. The latter guns were in short supply when the first ships were being completed and they often got a proportion of single mounts. By 1944, single-barrel Bofors 40 mm mounts began replacing the twin 20 mm mounts on a one for one basis. All of the ships were fitted for four throwers and two rails for depth charges.

== Service ==
Rattler was laid down on 14 April 1941 at Harland and Wolff, Belfast, launched on 9 December 1942 and commissioned on 22 April 1943. She was adopted by the community of Ripley, North Yorkshire after a Warship Week national savings campaign in March 1942.

After commissioning she was assigned to the 18th Minesweeping Flotilla, joining them in June 1943, when she was renamed Loyalty. She and the other ships of the flotilla carried out sweeping operations in Lyme Bay and the English Channel. She and other ships of the flotilla were transferred to Harwich in August to sweep areas of the North Sea, but was soon transferred to the 9th Flotilla, at Dover. On 25 August Loyalty was part of Operation Starkey, an attempt to attract German aircraft to unusual minesweeping operations near the French coast. The ships of the flotilla came under fire from shore batteries, and Hydra was damaged. They returned to Dover, but were mistakenly fired on by British shore batteries, causing further damage. Loyalty did not return to minesweeping duties until October.

In November Loyalty transferred to Scapa Flow to join the 15th Minesweeping Flotilla with the Home Fleet. She transferred again in December to the Orkney and Shetland Command, operating out of Seidisfjord on anti-submarine patrols and local convoy escort duties. She remained here until being nominated to return to the UK in March 1944 and in April underwent a refit at Portsmouth, after which she was assigned to Force G to give minesweeping support to the Allied landings in Normandy. Loyalty spent May carrying out exercises and rehearsals, and also escorted sister ship Stormcloud into Portsmouth after she had been damaged by a mine. Loyalty then took part in the assault operations of 6 June, clearing Channel 6, and then remaining deployed off Gold Beach to cover operations. She remained off Normandy after the landings and throughout July, carrying out sweeps of the anchorages.

== Sinking ==
Loyalty was still off Normandy on 22 August. She was returning to Portsmouth with the minesweepers Ready, Hound, Hydra and Rattlesnake when the sweep wires parted. Loyalty and the minesweeping trawler Doon were dispatched to recover the sweep. As they were doing this Loyalty was attacked and sunk by the German U-boat U-480 at position 50°09′N 00°41′W in the English Channel. She capsized in less than seven minutes, with the loss of her captain and 18 ratings. There were 30 survivors. Loyalty was replaced in the flotilla by sister ship Tanganyika. The wrecksite is designated as a protected place under the Protection of Military Remains Act 1986.
