= Tuxpam (disambiguation) =

Tuxpam may refer to

- Túxpam de Rodríguez Cano, a city in Mexico
- SS Tuxpam (1915) or SS Flying Lark, a banana boat built in 1915
- SS Tuxpam (1944), a dredger built in 1944
