= RFA Birchol (A127) =

1946 Ol-class coastal tanker of the Royal Fleet Auxiliary

History

United Kingdom
- Name: RFA Birchol
- Builder: Lobnitz & Co Ltd
- Laid down: 25 May 1945
- Launched: 19 February 1946
- In service: 12 June 1946
- Out of service: 1965
- Identification: Pennant number: A127
- Fate: Scrapped in 1969

General characteristics
- Class & type: Ol-class coastal tanker
- Displacement: 2,670 long tons (2,713 t)
- Length: 218 ft (66 m)
- Beam: 39 ft (12 m)
- Draught: 15 ft (4.6 m)
- Installed power: 1,140 indicated horsepower (850 kilowatts)
- Propulsion: 1 x enclosed, single screw, steam reciprocating engine (252 rpm)
- Speed: 11 knots (13 mph; 20 km/h)
- Complement: 26

RFA Birchol (A127) was an Ol-class coastal tanker of the Royal Fleet Auxiliary (RFA), the naval auxiliary fleet of the United Kingdom. She was built by the Lobnitz & Co Ltd shipbuilding company and launched on 19 February 1946. She served until being decommissioned in February 1965 and was scrapped at Antwerp from September 1969 onwards.
