= A132 =

A132 or A-132 may refer to:

- A132 road (England), a road connecting Pitsea and South Woodham Ferrers
- A132 motorway (France), a road connecting the A13 and Deauville / Trouville-sur-Mer
- Aerotec A-132 Tangará, a 1960s Brazilian military trainer aircraft
- RFA Diligence (A132), a 1981 Royal Fleet Auxiliary fleet repair ship
- RFA Eddybeach (A132), a 1951 Royal Fleet Auxiliary coastal tanker
