= A300 (disambiguation) =

The Airbus A300 is a wide-body airliner.

A300 or A.300 may also refer to:

- A300 road, a main road in Great Britain
- Acorn Archimedes A300, a British home computer
- Aero A.300, a 1938 Czechoslovak bomber aircraft
- Ansaldo A.300, a 1919 Italian general-purpose biplane aircraft
- Midland Highway (Victoria), a highway in Australia bears the designation A300 for most of its route
- RFA Oakol (A300), a British fleet auxiliary vessel
- A-100 (multiple rocket launcher), a version of Chinese 300 mm rocket artillery
- AMD A300 platform, a system on a chip solution for AMD Ryzen processors
- А-300-538, a proposed Russian civilian ekranoplan
