= A107 =

A107 may refer to:

- A107 road, ring highway in Great Britain
- A107 (Russian Federation), ring highway in Russian Federation
- RFA Eddybay (A107), a ship
