= Ol-class tanker =

Ol-class tanker may refer to:

- Ol-class tanker (1918) a class of six Royal Fleet Auxiliary replenishment oilers in service 1918–1952
- Ol-class tanker (1946), a class of four Royal Fleet Auxiliary coastal tankers in service 1946–1971
- Ol-class tanker (1965), a class of three Royal Fleet Auxiliary fast fleet tankers in service 1965–2021

== See also ==
- Belgol-class tanker, a class of ten Royal Fleet Auxiliary 2000-ton replenishment ships launched in 1917
