= RFA Eddyrock =

1953 Eddy-class coastal tankers of the Royal Fleet Auxiliary

History

United Kingdom
- Builder: Blyth Shipbuilding Company, Blyth, Northumberland, England
- Launched: 16 December 1952
- In service: 7 June 1953
- Out of service: 27 June 1967
- Identification: IMO number: 5096860; Pennant number: A198
- Fate: Sold commercially to Singapore on 27 June 1967

General characteristics
- Class & type: Eddy-class coastal tanker
- Tonnage: 2,224 GRT; 901 NRT; 2,286 DWT
- Displacement: 4,165 long tons (4,232 t) full load
- Length: 287 ft 8 in (88 m)
- Beam: 46 ft 4 in (14 m)
- Draught: 17 ft 3 in (5 m)
- Installed power: two scotch boilers; 1,750 ihp (1,300 kW)
- Propulsion: 3 cylinder triple-expansion steam engine; single shaft
- Speed: 12 knots
- Complement: 38

RFA Eddyrock (A198) was an Eddy-class coastal tanker of the Royal Fleet Auxiliary (RFA), the naval auxiliary fleet of the United Kingdom, built by the Blyth Shipbuilding Company, in Blyth, Northumberland, England and launched in 1952. Sold commercially to Singapore on 27 June 1967.

== Design and construction ==
These vessels were originally small tankers intended for fleet support operations; however, after the post-war restructuring of the Royal Fleet Auxiliary, they were swiftly repurposed for harbour and coastal activities. Designed with two Scotch boilers and a steam-powered, three-cylinder, triple expansion engine connected to a single screw, she was capable of reaching a speed of 12 knots (22 km/h; 14 mph). Her overall length was roughly 290 feet (88 m), with a beam measuring about 45 feet (14 m) and a displacement of 4,165 long tons (4,232 t)s.

RFA Eddyrock possessed a cargo capacity of 1,650 long tons (1,680 t)s and was engineered to transport a variety of fuels across four cargo tanks, which were managed by four cargo pumps. Furthermore, she was capable of housing two different grades of lubricating oil in specially designed tanks and had the ability to carry a limited amount of dry cargo and some ammunition. The cargo areas were outfitted with two three-ton and two one-ton derricks for efficient cargo handling, making her particularly practical in small harbours or at anchorages. She was staffed by a crew of around 38 and offered comfortable living accommodations for her size. Nevertheless, due to the low freeboard, she, like her sister ships, frequently appeared to be on the brink of being swamped when navigating with a full load.

RFA Eddyrock was launched by the Blyth Shipbuilding Company on the south bank of the River Blyth on 16 December 1952.
