= RFA Oakol (A300) =

1946 Ol-class coastal tanker of the Royal Fleet Auxiliary

History

United Kingdom
- Name: RFA Oakol
- Ordered: 27 September 1944
- Builder: Lobnitz
- Laid down: 12 December 1945
- Launched: 28 August 1946
- Commissioned: 1 November 1946
- Decommissioned: February 1965
- Fate: Scrapped in 1969

General characteristics
- Class & type: Ol-class coastal tanker
- Length: 231 ft 4 in (70.51 m)
- Beam: 38 ft 2 in (11.63 m)
- Draught: 15 ft 0.85 in (4.59 m)
- Propulsion: 3 cyl Triple expansion steam
- Speed: 10.5 knots (19.4 km/h)

RFA Oakol (A300) was an Ol-class coastal tanker of the Royal Fleet Auxiliary. She was launched on 28 August 1946. She served until being decommissioned in February 1965, and then served briefly as a food storage ship. She was scrapped at Ghent from 14 November 1969 onwards.
