= RFA Eddyness =

1953 Eddy-class coastal tankers of the Royal Fleet Auxiliary

History

United Kingdom
- Name: RFA Eddyness
- Builder: Blyth Shipbuilding Company, Blyth, Northumberland, England
- Launched: 22 October 1953
- In service: 11 October 1954
- Out of service: 29 January 1963
- Identification: IMO number: 5096846; Pennant number: A295
- Fate: Broken up February 1970

General characteristics
- Class & type: Eddy-class coastal tanker
- Tonnage: 2,224 GRT; 901 NRT; 2,286 DWT
- Displacement: 4,165 long tons (4,232 t) full load
- Length: 287 ft 8 in (88 m)
- Beam: 46 ft 4 in (14 m)
- Draught: 17 ft 3 in (5 m)
- Installed power: two scotch boilers; 1,750 ihp (1,300 kW)
- Propulsion: 3 cylinder Triple expansion steam; single shaft
- Speed: 12 knots
- Complement: 38

RFA Eddyness (A295) was an Eddy-class coastal tanker of the Royal Fleet Auxiliary (RFA), the naval auxiliary fleet of the United Kingdom, built by the Blyth Shipbuilding Company, in Blyth, Northumberland, England and launched in 1953. She was taken out of service at the beginning of 1963 and was eventually broken up at Valencia, Spain, in 1970.

== Design and construction ==
These vessels were initially small tankers designated for fleet support tasks; however, following the post-war transformation of the Royal Fleet Auxiliary, they were quickly redirected towards harbour and coastal operations. Engineered with two Scotch boilers and a steam-driven, three-cylinder, triple expansion engine coupled with a single screw, she could achieve a speed of 12 knots (22 km/h; 14 mph). Her length was approximately 290 feet (88 m), with a beam of about 45 feet (14 m) and a displacement of 4,165 long tons (4,232 t).

RFA Eddyness possessed a cargo capacity of 1,650 long tons (1,680 t) and was designed to transport various fuels across four cargo tanks, which were operated by four cargo pumps. Additionally, she could accommodate two distinct grades of lubricating oil in specially designed tanks and had the capability to transport a limited quantity of dry cargo and some ammunition. The cargo areas were equipped with two three-ton and two one-ton derricks for cargo handling, rendering her exceptionally practical in small harbours or at anchorages. She was crewed by a complement of approximately 38 and provided comfortable living quarters for her size. However, due to the low freeboard, she, as with her sister ships, often appeared as though she was on the verge of being swamped when navigating with a full load.

Eddyness was launched by the Blyth Shipbuilding Company on the south bank of the River Blyth on 22 October 1953.

== Operational history ==
On 9 June 1954, Captain Iden. W.J. Hall, RFA, was designated as Master. Subsequently, on 25 August 1954, she was registered in London as Eddyness under entry 176/54 in the Registry Book and on 11 October 1954, she was completed. The following year, on 25 June 1955, she entered Palmers Hebburn Company, Hebburn, for a refit. Notably, on 1 August 1956, she was loading in preparation for a deployment to Malta, as indicated by a Top Secret signal from the Admiralty to the Commander-in-Chief Mediterranean, which was also copied to the Commander-in-Chief East Indies and Flag Officer, Middle East. During the years 1957 and 1958, Eddyness operated primarily in the vicinity of Plymouth. Notably on 21 April 1959, at HMNB Devonport, she was alongside the lead ship of her class of aircraft carrier HMS Centaur, refuelling her with Aviation Carrier Turbine fuel. Throughout 1959, 1960, and 1961, she predominantly operated from Devonport dockyard; however, by 15 March 1962, she was stationed in Malta and the following month, she returned to Devonport. On 29 January 1963 Eddyness was de-stored and laid up at Devonport.

== Decommissioning and fate ==
On 22 and 29 of November 1969, the Board of Trade published an advertisement in The Times, offering the vessel for sale 'as lying' at Devonport on those dates. Subsequently, on 24 February 1970, she was towed from Devonport to the ship breakers, and later that same month, she arrived in Valencia, Spain, where she was dismantled by Aguilar y Peris.
