= Ol-class tanker (1946) =

Class of four coastal tankers of the Royal Fleet Auxiliary

Class overview
- Name: Ol class
- Builders: Lobnitz & Co Ltd, Renfrew
- Operators: Royal Fleet Auxiliary
- Built: 1945–1946
- In service: 1946–1971
- Planned: 4
- Completed: 4
- Retired: 4

General characteristics
- Type: Coastal tanker
- Displacement: 2,670 long tons (2,713 t)
- Length: 218 ft (66 m)
- Beam: 39 ft (12 m)
- Draught: 15 ft (4.6 m)
- Installed power: 1,140 indicated horsepower (850 kilowatts)
- Propulsion: 1 x enclosed, single screw, steam reciprocating engine (252 rpm)
- Speed: 11 knots (13 mph; 20 km/h)
- Complement: 26

The Ol-class coastal tankers were a class of harbour or port oilers used by the Royal Fleet Auxiliary (RFA), the naval auxiliary fleet of the United Kingdom. They were built between 1945–46 and served for just over twenty years.

== History ==
These vessels were a series of four Admiralty designed coastal tankers which were classified as Port Oilers. They were all built by the Lobnitz & Co Ltd shipbuilding company in Renfrew, Scotland, and all launched during 1946. Displacing just over 2,500 tonnes (2,500 long tons; 2,800 short tons), the ships were just over 200 feet (61 m) in length, just under 40 feet (12 m) breadth with a 15 feet (4.6 m) draught and could achieve 11 knots (20 km/h; 13 mph)s.

Three of the class, Birchol, Oakol and Teakol served with the Royal Fleet Auxiliary through to the mid-1960s, although Rowenol, which operated out of Malta, was taken out of service in 1971.

== Construction programme ==
| Name | Pennant | Builder | Laid down | Launched | Into Service | Out of Service | Ref |
|---|---|---|---|---|---|---|---|
| Birchol | A127 | Lobnitz & Co Ltd, Renfrew | - | 19 February 1946 | 12 June 1946 | 1965 | |
| Rowenol | A284 | Lobnitz & Co Ltd, Renfrew | 27 September 1945 | 15 May 1946 | 21 August 1946 | 1971 | |
| Oakol | A300 | Lobnitz & Co Ltd, Renfrew | 12 December 1945 | 28 August 1946 | 1 November 1946 | February 1965 | |
| Teakol | A167 | Lobnitz & Co Ltd, Renfrew | 27 May 1946 | 14 November 1946 | 14 January 1947 | 1969 | |

== See also ==
- List of replenishment ships of the Royal Fleet Auxiliary
