= RFA Rowanol =

1946 Ol-class coastal tanker of the Royal Fleet Auxiliary

History

United Kingdom
- Name: RFA Rowanol
- Ordered: 27 September 1944
- Laid down: 27 September 1945
- Launched: 15 May 1946, as Ebonol
- Commissioned: 21 August 1946, as Cedarol
- Decommissioned: 3 December 1970
- Renamed: Rowanol, 18 September 1947
- Identification: Pennant number: A284
- Fate: Arrived at Zeebrugge for scrapping, 10 December 1971

General characteristics
- Class & type: Ol-class coastal tanker
- Length: 231 ft 4 in (70.51 m)
- Beam: 38 ft 2 in (11.63 m)
- Draught: 15 ft 8 in (4.78 m)
- Propulsion: 3-cylinder triple expansion steam engine
- Speed: 10.5 knots (19.4 km/h; 12.1 mph)
- Armament: None

RFA Rowanol (A284) was an Ol-class coastal tanker of the Royal Fleet Auxiliary.

Laid down on 27 September 1945, and launched on 15 May 1946 as Ebonol, she was the second ship to bear this name. Commissioned on 21 August 1946 as Cedarol, and renamed Rowanol on 18 September 1947. The ship was decommissioned on 3 December 1970 and laid up at Devonport. She arrived in tow at Zeebrugge for scrapping on 10 December 1971.
