= RFA Eddycliff =

1953 Eddy-class coastal tankers of the Royal Fleet Auxiliary

History

United Kingdom
- Name: RFA Eddycliff
- Builder: Blythswood Shipbuilding, Scotstoun, Scotland
- Launched: 25 August 1952
- In service: 10 February 1953
- Out of service: August 1963
- Identification: Pennant number: A190; IMO number: 5096810
- Fate: Sold commercially to Greece in 1964 and renamed Knossos.

General characteristics
- Class & type: Eddy-class coastal tanker
- Tonnage: 2,224 GRT; 901 NRT; 2,286 DWT
- Displacement: 4,165 long tons (4,232 t) full load
- Length: 287 ft 8 in (88 m)
- Beam: 46 ft 4 in (14 m)
- Draught: 17 ft 3 in (5 m)
- Installed power: two scotch boilers; 1,750 ihp (1,300 kW)
- Propulsion: 3 cylinder Triple expansion steam; single shaft
- Speed: 12 knots
- Complement: 38

RFA Eddycliff (A190) was an Eddy-class coastal tanker of the Royal Fleet Auxiliary (RFA), the naval auxiliary fleet of the United Kingdom.
