= RFA Eddyreef =

1953 Eddy-class coastal tankers of the Royal Fleet Auxiliary

- RFA Eddyreef

History

United Kingdom
- Name: RFA Eddyreef
- Builder: Caledon Shipbuilding Co., Dundee
- Launched: 28 May 1953
- In service: 23 October 1953
- Out of service: 1958
- Fate: Scrapped, 1964

General characteristics
- Class & type: Eddy-class coastal tanker
- Type: Tanker
- Tonnage: 2,224 GRT; 901 NRT; 2,286 DWT
- Displacement: 4,165 long tons (4,232 t) full load
- Length: 287 ft 8 in (88 m)
- Beam: 46 ft 4 in (14 m)
- Draught: 17 ft 3 in (5 m)
- Installed power: two scotch boilers; 1,750 ihp (1,300 kW)
- Propulsion: 3 cylinder triple expansion steam engine; single shaft
- Speed: 12 knots (22 km/h; 14 mph)
- Complement: 38

RFA Eddyreef (A202) was an Eddy-class coastal tanker of the Royal Fleet Auxiliary (RFA), the naval auxiliary fleet of the United Kingdom.

Built by the Caledon Shipbuilding & Engineering Company, Dundee, the ship was launched on 28 May 1953, and entered service on 23 October 1953.

Eddyreef was laid up in 1958, and departed from Devonport, Plymouth, in tow for demolition at Willebroek, Belgium, in March 1964.
