= RFA Eddyfirth =

1954 Eddy-class coastal tankers of the Royal Fleet Auxiliary

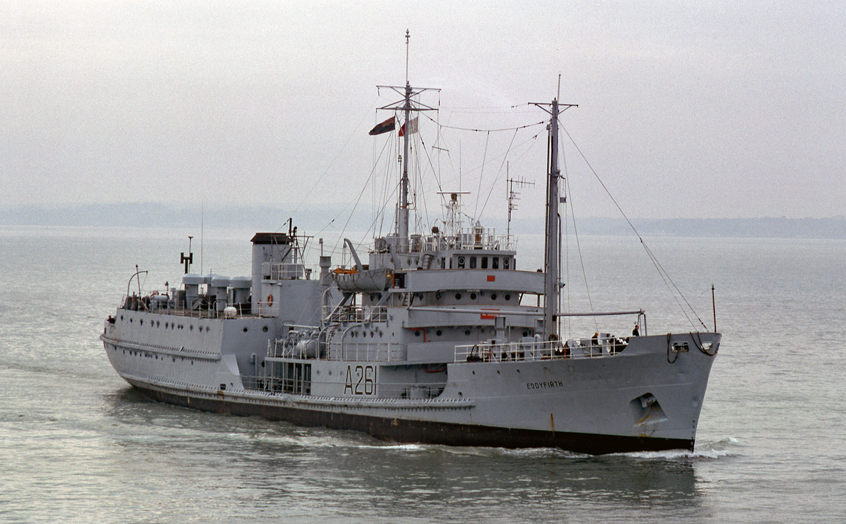
- RFA Eddyfirth (A261) approaching Portsmouth

History

United Kingdom
- Name: RFA Eddyfirth
- Builder: Lobnitz & Co., Renfrew, Scotland
- Laid down: 28 April 1952
- Launched: 10 September 1953
- In service: 25 April 1954
- Out of service: 1 April 1981
- Identification: Pennant number: A261; IMO number: 5096834
- Fate: Scrapped at Seville on 28 March 1982.

General characteristics
- Class & type: Eddy-class coastal tanker
- Length: 287 ft 1 in (88 m)
- Beam: 44 ft 1 in (13 m)
- Draught: 17 ft 3.5 in (5 m)
- Propulsion: 3 cylinder Triple expansion steam
- Speed: 12 knots
- Complement: 8 officers, 18 ratings
- Armament: No armament carried but fitted for two 50-cal machine guns on bridge wings and two 20mm AA guns aft.

RFA Eddyfirth (A261) was an Eddy-class coastal tanker of the Royal Fleet Auxiliary (RFA), the naval auxiliary fleet of the United Kingdom.

== Construction and design ==
Eddyfirth was launched at Lobnitz & Co.'s Renfrew shipyard on 10 September 1953 and completed on 10 February 1954. The ship had an overall length of 286 feet (87.2 m) and a length between perpendiculars of 270 feet (82.3 m). Beam was 44 feet (13.4 m) and draft 17 feet 2 inches (5.23 m). The ship displaced 1,960 long tons (1,990 t) light and 4,160 long tons (4,230 t) full load, with a capacity of 1650 tons of oil. Two oil fired boilers fed a triple-expansion steam engine rated at 1,750 indicated horsepower (1,300 kW) and drove a single propeller shaft, giving a speed of 12 knots (22 km/h; 14 mph).

== Service history ==
Initially, Eddyfirth was based in Malta as support for the Motor Minesweeping Flotilla. In 1966 she returned to United Kingdom coastal waters, reclassified as a harbour oiler. Withdrawn from service in 1981, she was scrapped in Seville in March 1982.

== Bibliography ==
- Blackman, Raymond V. B. (1971). Jane's Fighting Ships 1971–72. London: Sampson Low, Marston & Co., Ltd. ISBN 0-354-00096-9.
