= RFA Eddybay =

1952 Eddy-class coastal tankers of the Royal Fleet Auxiliary

History

United Kingdom
- Name: RFA Eddybay
- Builder: Caledon Shipbuilding & Engineering Company, Dundee
- Laid down: 23 March 1951
- Launched: 29 November 1951
- In service: 25 April 1952
- Out of service: 9 November 1962
- Identification: Pennant number: A107
- Fate: Arrived Antwerp for demolition 29 August 1964

General characteristics
- Class & type: Eddy-class coastal tanker
- Tonnage: 2,224 GRT; 901 NRT; 2,286 DWT
- Displacement: 4,165 long tons (4,232 t) full load
- Length: 287 ft 8 in (88 m)
- Beam: 46 ft 4 in (14 m)
- Draught: 17 ft 3 in (5 m)
- Installed power: two scotch boilers; 1,750 ihp (1,300 kW)
- Propulsion: 3 cylinder Triple expansion steam; single shaft
- Speed: 12 knots
- Complement: 38

RFA Eddybay (A107) was an Eddy-class coastal tanker of the Royal Fleet Auxiliary (RFA), the naval auxiliary fleet of the United Kingdom. As with others of the class the ship had a short career and was stationed at Gibraltar for much of that time as a petrol carrier, spending three years at the colony in total.
