= RFA Eddybeach =

1951 Eddy-class coastal tankers of the Royal Fleet Auxiliary

History

United Kingdom
- Name: Eddybeach
- Builder: Caledon Shipbuilding & Engineering Company, Dundee
- Laid down: 20 March 1950
- Launched: 24 April 1951
- In service: 8 December 1951
- Out of service: 27 May 1962
- Renamed: Mykinai
- Identification: Pennant number: A132
- Fate: Sold to Greece in 1964; Foundered at her moorings at Mar del Plata, 2 September 1979

General characteristics
- Class & type: Eddy-class coastal tanker
- Tonnage: 2,224 GRT; 901 NRT; 2,286 DWT
- Displacement: 4,165 long tons (4,232 t) full load
- Length: 287 ft 8 in (88 m)
- Beam: 46 ft 4 in (14 m)
- Draught: 17 ft 3 in (5 m)
- Installed power: two scotch boilers; 1,750 ihp (1,300 kW)
- Propulsion: 3 cylinder Triple expansion steam; single shaft
- Speed: 12 knots
- Complement: 38

RFA Eddybeach (A132) was an Eddy-class coastal tanker of the Royal Fleet Auxiliary (RFA), the naval auxiliary fleet of the United Kingdom. The ship mainly saw service in the Mediterranean, quite often at Gibraltar where it functioned as a water carrier. In 1964 Eddybeach was disposed of by sale to Greece.

Eddybeach can be seen in the background during the scene depicting Lional 'Buster' Crabb's first dive in Gibraltar harbour in the film The Silent Enemy (1958).
