= HMS Hydra (J275) =

Minesweeper of the Royal Navy

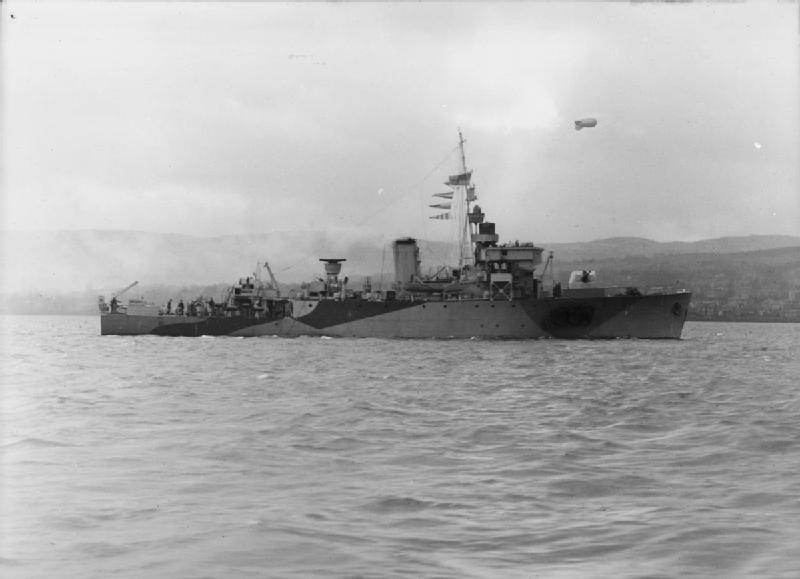
- HMS Hydra in service.

History

United Kingdom
- Name: HMS Hydra
- Builder: Lobnitz & Co., Renfrew
- Launched: 29 September 1942
- Identification: Pennant number: J275
- Fate: Mined 10 November 1944, declared constructive loss and broken up 1947

General characteristics
- Class & type: Algerine-class minesweeper
- Displacement: 1,030 long tons (1,047 t) (standard); 1,325 long tons (1,346 t) (deep)
- Length: 225 ft (69 m) o/a
- Beam: 35 ft 6 in (10.82 m)
- Draught: 12.25 ft 6 in (3.89 m)
- Installed power: 2 × Admiralty 3-drum boilers; 2,400 ihp (1,800 kW)
- Propulsion: 2 shafts; 2 vertical triple-expansion steam engines
- Speed: 16.5 knots (30.6 km/h; 19.0 mph)
- Range: 5,000 nmi (9,300 km; 5,800 mi) at 10 knots (19 km/h; 12 mph)
- Complement: 85
- Armament: 1 × QF 4 in (102 mm) Mk V anti-aircraft gun; 4 × twin Oerlikon 20 mm cannon

HMS Hydra was a reciprocating engine-powered Algerine-class minesweeper built for the Royal Navy during the Second World War. She was badly damaged during the war and was scrapped in 1947.

== Design and description ==
The reciprocating group displaced 1,010–1,030 long tons (1,030–1,050 t) at standard load and 1,305–1,325 long tons (1,326–1,346 t) at deep load The ships measured 225 feet (68.6 m) long overall with a beam of 35 feet 6 inches (10.8 m). They had a draught of 12 feet 3 inches (3.7 m). The ships' complement consisted of 85 officers and ratings.

The reciprocating ships had two vertical triple-expansion steam engines, each driving one shaft, using steam provided by two Admiralty three-drum boilers. The engines produced a total of 2,400 indicated horsepower (1,800 kW) and gave a maximum speed of 16.5 knots (30.6 km/h; 19.0 mph). They carried a maximum of 660 long tons (671 t) of fuel oil that gave them a range of 5,000 nautical miles (9,300 km; 5,800 mi) at 10 knots (19 km/h; 12 mph).

The Algerine class was armed with a QF 4 in (102 mm) Mk V anti-aircraft gun and four twin-gun mounts for Oerlikon 20 mm cannon. The latter guns were in short supply when the first ships were being completed and they often got a proportion of single mounts. By 1944, single-barrel Bofors 40 mm mounts began replacing the twin 20 mm mounts on a one for one basis. All of the ships were fitted for four throwers and two rails for depth charges.

== Construction and career ==
Hydra was laid down at the yard of Lobnitz, Renfrew. As a result of savings raised during "Warship Week", she was adopted by Wellingborough Urban District Council in Northamptonshire on 14 March 1942. She was launched on 29 September 1942. Hydra joined the 18th Minesweeping Flotilla in the Rosyth Command on 20 February 1943 and was transferred in May 1943 to the Nore Command. She was variously employed on minesweeping in the North Sea in 1943 and on escort duty with Arctic convoys from 1943 to 1944, including the convoys JW 55B and JW 57 to Kola in 1943–44.

She was part of Operation Neptune, the naval part of the D-Day landings at Normandy on 6 June 1944. She was mined in the approaches to Ostend on 10 November 1944. She was towed to Sheerness but declared a constructive total loss and not repaired. She was sold for scrap and arrived at the yard of Thos. W. Ward in Grays, Essex to be broken up in 1947.

== Bibliography ==
- Chesneau, Roger, ed. (1980). Conway's All the World's Fighting Ships 1922–1946. Greenwich, UK: Conway Maritime Press. ISBN 0-85177-146-7.
- Colledge, J. J.; Warlow, Ben (2006) [1969]. Ships of the Royal Navy: The Complete Record of All Fighting Ships of the Royal Navy from the 15th Century to the Present (3rd Rev ed.). London: Chatham Publishing. ISBN 978-1-86176-281-8. OCLC 67375475.
- Lenton, H. T. (1998). British & Empire Warships of the Second World War. Annapolis, Maryland: Naval Institute Press. ISBN 1-55750-048-7.
