= SS Tuxpam (1944) =

History
- Name: Empire Clydesdale (1944–1946); Tuxpam (1946–1970)
- Owner: Ministry of War Transport (1944–1946); Secretario de Marina, Mexico (1946–1970)
- Port of registry: (United Kingdom) Glasgow (1944–1946); Mexico (1946–1968); Mexico (1968–1970)
- Builder: Lobnitz & Co Ltd
- Yard number: 966
- Launched: 30 October 1944
- Identification: Code Letters MKPP (1944-46); United Kingdom Official Number 169129
- Fate: Scrapped

General characteristics
- Class & type: Suction hopper dredger
- Tonnage: 1,747 GRT; 839 NRT
- Length: 256 ft 7 in (78.21 m)
- Beam: 42 ft 1 in (12.83 m)
- Depth: 19 ft 1 in (5.82 m)
- Installed power: Triple expansion steam engine
- Propulsion: Screw propeller

Tuxpam was a 1,747 gross register tons (GRT) suction hopper dredger which was built in 1944 by Lobnitz & Co Ltd, Renfrew. She was laid down as Mazatlan for the Mexican Government but was requisitioned by the British Ministry of War Transport (MoWT) whilst under construction and launched as Empire Clydesdale. In 1946 she was transferred to the Mexican Government and renamed Tuxpam. The vessel was scrapped in 1970.

== Description ==
The ship was built by Lobnitz & Co Ltd, Renfrew, as yard number 966.

The ship was 256 feet 7 inches (78.21 m) long, with a beam of 42 feet 1 inch (12.83 m) and a depth of 19 feet 1 inch (5.82 m). The ship had a gross register tonnage of 1,747 and a net register tonnage of 839.

The vessel was propelled by a triple expansion steam engine, which had cylinders of 13 inches (33 cm), 22 inches (56 cm) and 34 inches (86 cm) diameter by 22 inches (56 cm) stroke. The engine was built by Lobnitz.

== History ==
Empire Clydesdale was laid down as Mazatlan for the Mexican Government. She was requisitioned by the British Ministry of War Transport and launched as Empire Clydesdale. The port of registry was Glasgow. The Code Letters MKPP and United Kingdom Official Number 169125 were allocated.

In 1946, Empire Clydesdale was transferred to the Secretario de Marina, Mexico and renamed Tuxpam. She served until 1970 when she was scrapped.
