= German submarine U-11 (1935) =

German World War II submarine

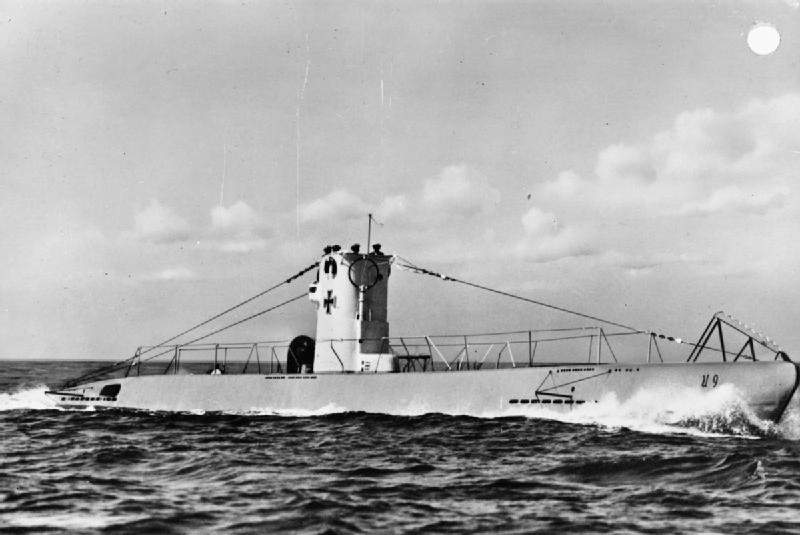
- U-9, a typical Type IIB boat

History

Nazi Germany
- Name: U-11
- Ordered: 20 July 1934
- Builder: Germaniawerft, Kiel
- Yard number: 545
- Laid down: 6 May 1935
- Launched: 27 August 1935
- Commissioned: 21 September 1935
- Stricken: 5 January 1945, Kiel
- Fate: Scuttled: 3 May 1945, Kiel Arsenal

General characteristics
- Class & type: Type IIB coastal submarine
- Displacement: 279 t (275 long tons) surfaced; 328 t (323 long tons) submerged
- Length: 42.70 m (140 ft 1 in) o/a; 27.80 m (91 ft 2 in) pressure hull
- Beam: 4.08 m (13 ft 5 in) (o/a); 4.00 m (13 ft 1 in) (pressure hull)
- Height: 8.60 m (28 ft 3 in)
- Draught: 3.90 m (12 ft 10 in)
- Installed power: 700 PS (510 kW; 690 bhp) (diesels); 410 PS (300 kW; 400 shp) (electric)
- Propulsion: 2 shafts; 2 × diesel engines; 2 × electric motors
- Speed: 13 knots (24 km/h; 15 mph) surfaced; 7 knots (13 km/h; 8.1 mph) submerged
- Range: 1,800 nmi (3,300 km; 2,100 mi) at 12 knots (22 km/h; 14 mph) surfaced; 35–43 nmi (65–80 km; 40–49 mi) at 4 knots (7.4 km/h; 4.6 mph) submerged
- Test depth: 80 m (260 ft)
- Complement: 3 officers, 22 men
- Armament: 3 × 53.3 cm (21 in) torpedo tubes; 5 × torpedoes or up to 12 TMA or 18 TMB mines; 1 × 2 cm (0.79 in) C/30 anti-aircraft gun

Service record
- Part of: U-boat School Flotilla; 1 September 1935 – 1 August 1939; 1 September 1939 – 30 June 1940; 1st U-boat Flotilla; 1 July – 30 November 1940; 21st U-boat Flotilla; 1 December 1940 – 1 May 1941; 5th U-boat Flotilla; 1 October 1941 – 28 February 1943; 22nd U-boat Flotilla; 1 March 1943 – 14 December 1944
- Identification codes: M 27 219
- Commanders: Kptlt. Hans-Rudolf Rösing; 21 September 1935 – 1 October 1937; Kptlt. Viktor Schütze; 13 August 1938 – 4 September 1939; Kptlt. Georg Peters; 5 September 1939 – 22 March 1943; Oblt.z.S.d.R Gottfried Stolzenburg; 23 March 1943 – 13 July 1944; Oblt.z.S. Günter Dobenecker; 14 July – 14 December 1944
- Operations: None
- Victories: None

German submarine U-11 was a Type IIB U-boat built before World War II for service in Nazi Germany's Kriegsmarine. She was commissioned on 21 September 1935, with Kapitänleutnant Hans-Rudolf Rösing in command. She served in several training flotillas in her 10-year career, but sank or damaged no ships.

In 1940, U-11 was the first unit to carry out sea trials of a new anechoic tile, which was developed by the Kriegsmarine for reducing a submarines' acoustic signature. This development project was codenamed Alberich after the invisible sorcerer from Germanic mythology.

== Design ==
German Type IIB submarines were enlarged versions of the original Type IIs. U-11 had a displacement of 279 tonnes (275 long tons) when at the surface and 328 tonnes (323 long tons) while submerged. Officially, the standard tonnage was 250 long tons (250 t), however. The U-boat had a total length of 42.70 m (140 ft 1 in), a pressure hull length of 28.20 m (92 ft 6 in), a beam of 4.08 m (13 ft 5 in), a height of 8.60 m (28 ft 3 in), and a draught of 3.90 m (12 ft 10 in). The submarine was powered by two MWM RS 127 S four-stroke, six-cylinder diesel engines of 700 metric horsepower (510 kW; 690 shp) for cruising, two Siemens-Schuckert PG VV 322/36 double-acting electric motors producing a total of 460 metric horsepower (340 kW; 450 shp) for use while submerged. She had two shafts and two 0.85 m (3 ft) propellers. The boat was capable of operating at depths of up to 80–150 metres (260–490 ft).

The submarine had a maximum surface speed of 12 knots (22 km/h; 14 mph) and a maximum submerged speed of 7 knots (13 km/h; 8.1 mph). When submerged, the boat could operate for 35–42 nautical miles (65–78 km; 40–48 mi) at 4 knots (7.4 km/h; 4.6 mph); when surfaced, she could travel 3,800 nautical miles (7,000 km; 4,400 mi) at 8 knots (15 km/h; 9.2 mph). U-11 was fitted with three 53.3 cm (21 in) torpedo tubes at the bow, five torpedoes or up to twelve Type A torpedo mines, and a 2 cm (0.79 in) anti-aircraft gun. The boat had a complement of twentyfive.

== Fate ==
The U-boat was scuttled on 3 May 1945 in Kiel. The wreck was broken up.

== Bibliography ==
- Busch, Rainer; Röll, Hans-Joachim (1999). German U-boat commanders of World War II : a biographical dictionary. Translated by Brooks, Geoffrey. London, Annapolis, Md: Greenhill Books, Naval Institute Press. ISBN 1-55750-186-6.
- Busch, Rainer; Röll, Hans-Joachim (1999). Deutsche U-Boot-Verluste von September 1939 bis Mai 1945 [German U-boat losses from September 1939 to May 1945]. Der U-Boot-Krieg (in German). Vol. IV. Hamburg, Berlin, Bonn: Mittler. ISBN 3-8132-0514-2.
- Gröner, Erich; Jung, Dieter; Maass, Martin (1991). U-boats and Mine Warfare Vessels. German Warships 1815–1945. Vol. 2. Translated by Thomas, Keith; Magowan, Rachel. London: Conway Maritime Press. ISBN 0-85177-593-4.
