= German submarine U-485 =

German World War II submarine

History

Nazi Germany
- Name: U-485
- Ordered: 5 June 1941
- Builder: Deutsche Werke, Kiel
- Yard number: 320
- Laid down: 3 May 1943
- Launched: 15 January 1944
- Commissioned: 23 February 1944
- Fate: Surrendered at Gibraltar on 12 May 1945; sunk as part of Operation Deadlight, north of Ireland on 8 December 1945

General characteristics
- Class & type: Type VIIC submarine
- Displacement: 769 tonnes (757 long tons) surfaced; 871 t (857 long tons) submerged
- Length: 67.23 m (220 ft 7 in) o/a; 50.50 m (165 ft 8 in) pressure hull
- Beam: 6.20 m (20 ft 4 in) o/a; 4.70 m (15 ft 5 in) pressure hull
- Height: 9.60 m (31 ft 6 in)
- Draught: 4.74 m (15 ft 7 in)
- Installed power: 2,800–3,200 PS (2,100–2,400 kW; 2,800–3,200 bhp) (diesels); 750 PS (550 kW; 740 shp) (electric)
- Propulsion: 2 shafts; 2 × diesel engines; 2 × electric motors.
- Speed: 17.7 knots (32.8 km/h; 20.4 mph) surfaced; 7.6 knots (14.1 km/h; 8.7 mph) submerged
- Range: 8,500 nmi (15,700 km; 9,800 mi) at 10 knots (19 km/h; 12 mph) surfaced; 80 nmi (150 km; 92 mi) at 4 knots (7.4 km/h; 4.6 mph) submerged
- Test depth: 230 m (750 ft); Crush depth: 250–295 m (820–968 ft)
- Complement: 4 officers, 40–56 enlisted
- Armament: 5 × 53.3 cm (21 in) torpedo tubes (four bow, one stern); 14 × torpedoes or 26 TMA mines; 1 × 8.8 cm (3.46 in) deck gun (220 rounds); 1 × 3.7 cm (1.5 in) Flak M42 AA gun; 2 × twin 2 cm (0.79 in) C/30 anti-aircraft guns

Service record
- Part of: 5th U-boat Flotilla; 23 February – 31 October 1944; 11th U-boat Flotilla; 1 November 1944 – 8 May 1945
- Identification codes: M 49 981
- Commanders: Kptlt. Friedrich Lutz; 23 February – 12 May 1945
- Operations: 3 patrols: 1st patrol: a. 29 November 1944 – 30 January 1945; b. 1 – 3 February 1945; 2nd patrol: 25 March – 24 April 1945; 3rd patrol: 29 April – 14 May 1945
- Victories: None

German submarine U-485 was a Type VIIC U-boat of Nazi Germany's Kriegsmarine during World War II.

She carried out three patrols. She sank no ships.

U-485 surrendered in Gibraltar on 12 May 1945; she was sunk as part of Operation Deadlight, north of Ireland on 8 December 1945.

== Design ==
German Type VIIC submarines were preceded by the shorter Type VIIB submarines. U-485 had a displacement of 769 tonnes (757 long tons) when at the surface and 871 tonnes (857 long tons) while submerged. She had a total length of 67.10 m (220 ft 2 in), a pressure hull length of 50.50 m (165 ft 8 in), a beam of 6.20 m (20 ft 4 in), a height of 9.60 m (31 ft 6 in), and a draught of 4.74 m (15 ft 7 in). The submarine was powered by two Germaniawerft F46 four-stroke, six-cylinder supercharged diesel engines producing a total of 2,800 to 3,200 metric horsepower (2,060 to 2,350 kW; 2,760 to 3,160 shp) for use while surfaced, two Siemens-Schuckert GU 343/38–8 double-acting electric motors producing a total of 750 metric horsepower (550 kW; 740 shp) for use while submerged. She had two shafts and two 1.23 m (4 ft) propellers. The boat was capable of operating at depths of up to 230 metres (750 ft).

The submarine had a maximum surface speed of 17.7 knots (32.8 km/h; 20.4 mph) and a maximum submerged speed of 7.6 knots (14.1 km/h; 8.7 mph). When submerged, the boat could operate for 80 nautical miles (150 km; 92 mi) at 4 knots (7.4 km/h; 4.6 mph); when surfaced, she could travel 8,500 nautical miles (15,700 km; 9,800 mi) at 10 knots (19 km/h; 12 mph). U-485 was fitted with five 53.3 cm (21 in) torpedo tubes (four fitted at the bow and one at the stern), fourteen torpedoes, one 8.8 cm (3.46 in) SK C/35 naval gun, (220 rounds), one 3.7 cm (1.5 in) Flak M42 and two twin 2 cm (0.79 in) C/30 anti-aircraft guns. The boat had a complement of between forty-four and sixty.

== Service history ==
The submarine was laid down on 3 May 1943 at the Deutsche Werke in Kiel as yard number 320, launched on 15 January 1944 and commissioned on 23 February under the command of Kapitänleutnant Friedrich Lutz.

She served with the 5th U-boat Flotilla from 23 February 1944 for training and the 11th flotilla from 1 November for operations.

=== First patrol ===
U-485's first patrol was preceded by short journeys from Kiel in Germany to Horten Naval Base (south of Oslo) and then Bergen, both in Norway. The patrol itself began when the boat departed Bergen on 29 November 1944. She proceeded west of the Shetland Islands on 4 December and west of Ireland on the 14th. She entered the English Channel and was northwest of the Channel Islands on the 21st. The furthest east that she travelled was to a point south of Brighton, which she reached on 5 January 1945. She then retraced her route via the Scilly Isles; she returned to Bergen on 30 January.

=== Second patrol ===
The submarine had moved to Trondheim from where she departed on her second patrol on 25 March 1945. Her route took her through the gap between Iceland and the Faroe Islands. She docked at La Pallice in France on 24 April.

=== Third patrol, surrender and fate ===
Leaving La Pallice on 29 April 1945, the boat surrendered in Gibraltar on 12 May, four days after Germany's capitulation. She was transferred to Loch Ryan in Scotland for Operation Deadlight and was sunk by unknown causes on 8 December north of Ireland.

== Bibliography ==
- Busch, Rainer; Röll, Hans-Joachim (1999). German U-boat commanders of World War II : a biographical dictionary. Translated by Brooks, Geoffrey. London, Annapolis, Md: Greenhill Books, Naval Institute Press. ISBN 1-55750-186-6.
- Busch, Rainer; Röll, Hans-Joachim (1999). Deutsche U-Boot-Verluste von September 1939 bis Mai 1945 [German U-boat losses from September 1939 to May 1945]. Der U-Boot-Krieg (in German). Vol. IV. Hamburg, Berlin, Bonn: Mittler. ISBN 3-8132-0514-2.
- Gröner, Erich; Jung, Dieter; Maass, Martin (1991). U-boats and Mine Warfare Vessels. German Warships 1815–1945. Vol. 2. Translated by Thomas, Keith; Magowan, Rachel. London: Conway Maritime Press. ISBN 0-85177-593-4.
