= Lobnitz =

Scottish shipbuilding company

Coordinates: 5°53′16.4″N 4°23′36.5″W

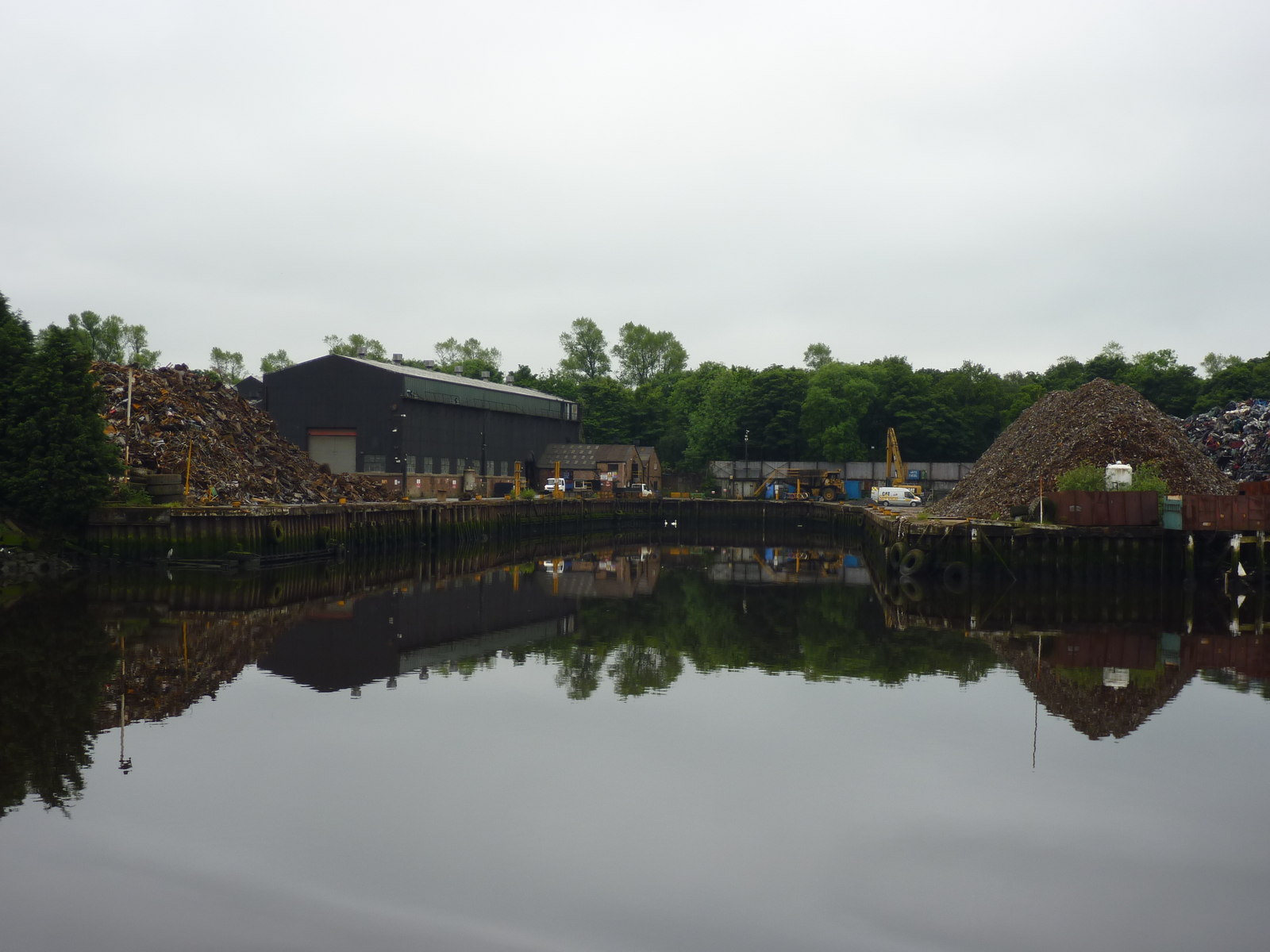
The former Simons and Lobnitz shipyard basin at Blythswood in Renfrew

Lobnitz & Company (established with William Simons & Co.) was a Scottish shipbuilding company located at Renfrew on the River Clyde, west of the Renfrew Ferry crossing and east of the confluence with the River Cart. The Lobnitz family lived at Chapeltoun House in East Ayrshire. The company built warships, dredgers, floating docks, fishing boats, tugboats and workboats.

== History ==
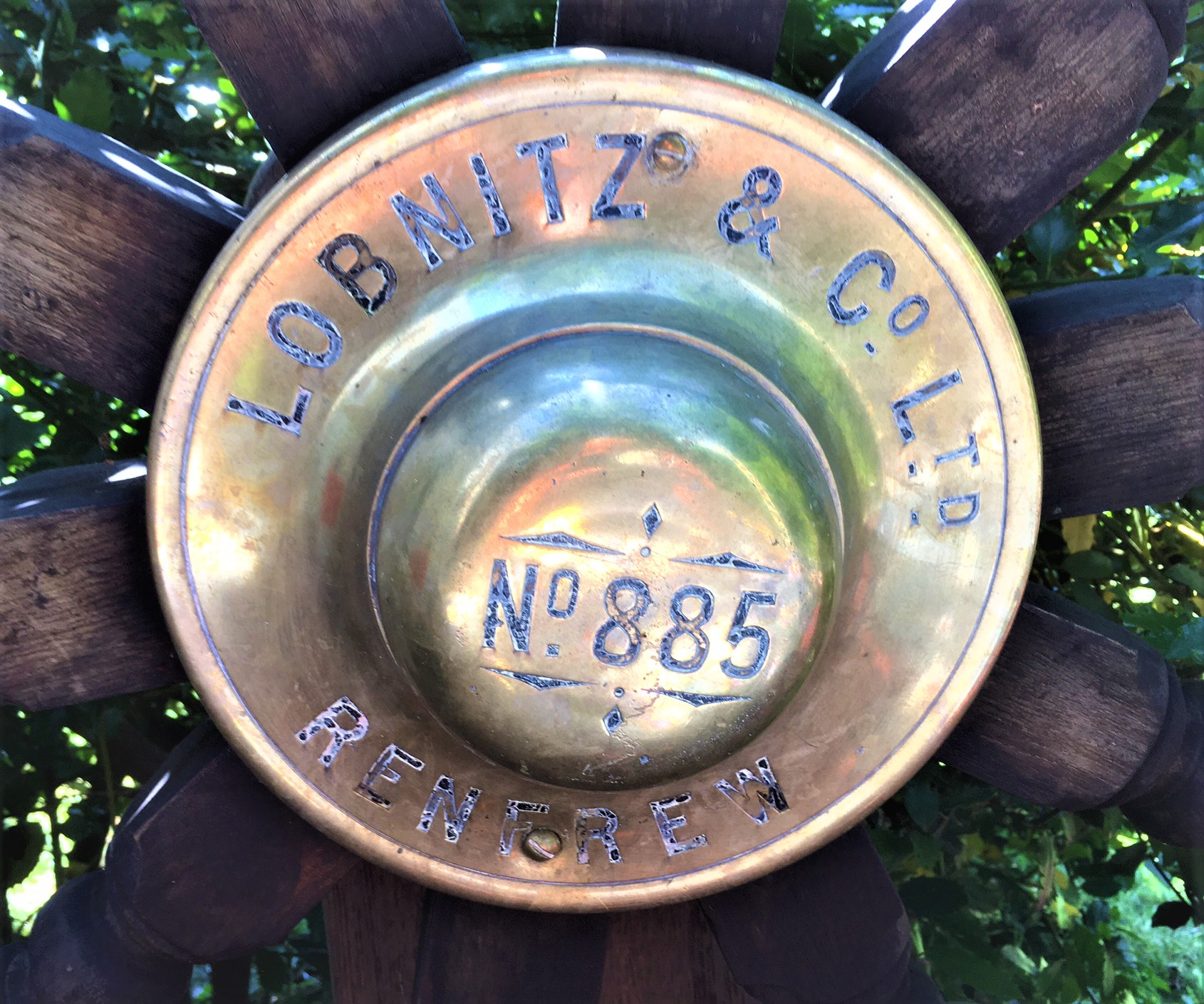
Detail of ships wheel, LOBNITZ & CO LTD No 885 RENFREW

The company was descended from Coulburn Lobnitz & Company, established in 1874, and the adjacent shipyard of William Simons & Co, established in 1860. Coulborn Lobnitz had in turn evolved from the 1847 firm of James Henderson & Son, at Ship dock, Renfrew, which became Henderson, Coulborn & Co. In 1874, Lobnitz took over the business, which was renamed Lobnitz, Coulborn & Co. Both builders specialised in the construction of dredgers and hopper barges.

In 1945, the company became a public company and public shares were issued. The yard was expanded and improved but entered financial difficulties in the 1950s. The two companies of Lobnitz and William Simons amalgamated in 1957 as Simons-Lobnitz Ltd and later, in 1959 the company merged with G&J pump manufacturers.

=== Warship and military construction ===
In addition, over sixty minor war vessels (sloops, corvettes, minesweepers and boom defence vessels) were constructed by Lobnitz at Renfrew between 1915 and 1945 during the First World War and Second World War for the Royal Navy. Several ships built at Lobnitz participated in the Normandy landings. The Mulberry harbours used for logistical supplies in the opening months of the invasion were based on a design of a Lobnitz Dredger preform.

=== Lobnitz Marine Holdings ===
Faced with declining business the Renfrew yard finally closed in 1964, after some 1300 dredgers as well as barges and tugs had been built at the site.

The company's goodwill and orders were purchased in 1964 by Alexander Stephen and Sons, which merged into Upper Clyde Shipbuilders in 1968. Simons-Lobnitz re-emerged from the collapse of UCS in 1971 and continues to operate as a marine engineering and naval architecture consultancy based in Paisley, now called Lobnitz Marine Holdings.

In 2020, a planning application was made to fill in the former Lobnitz dock on the Clyde.

== Surviving ships ==
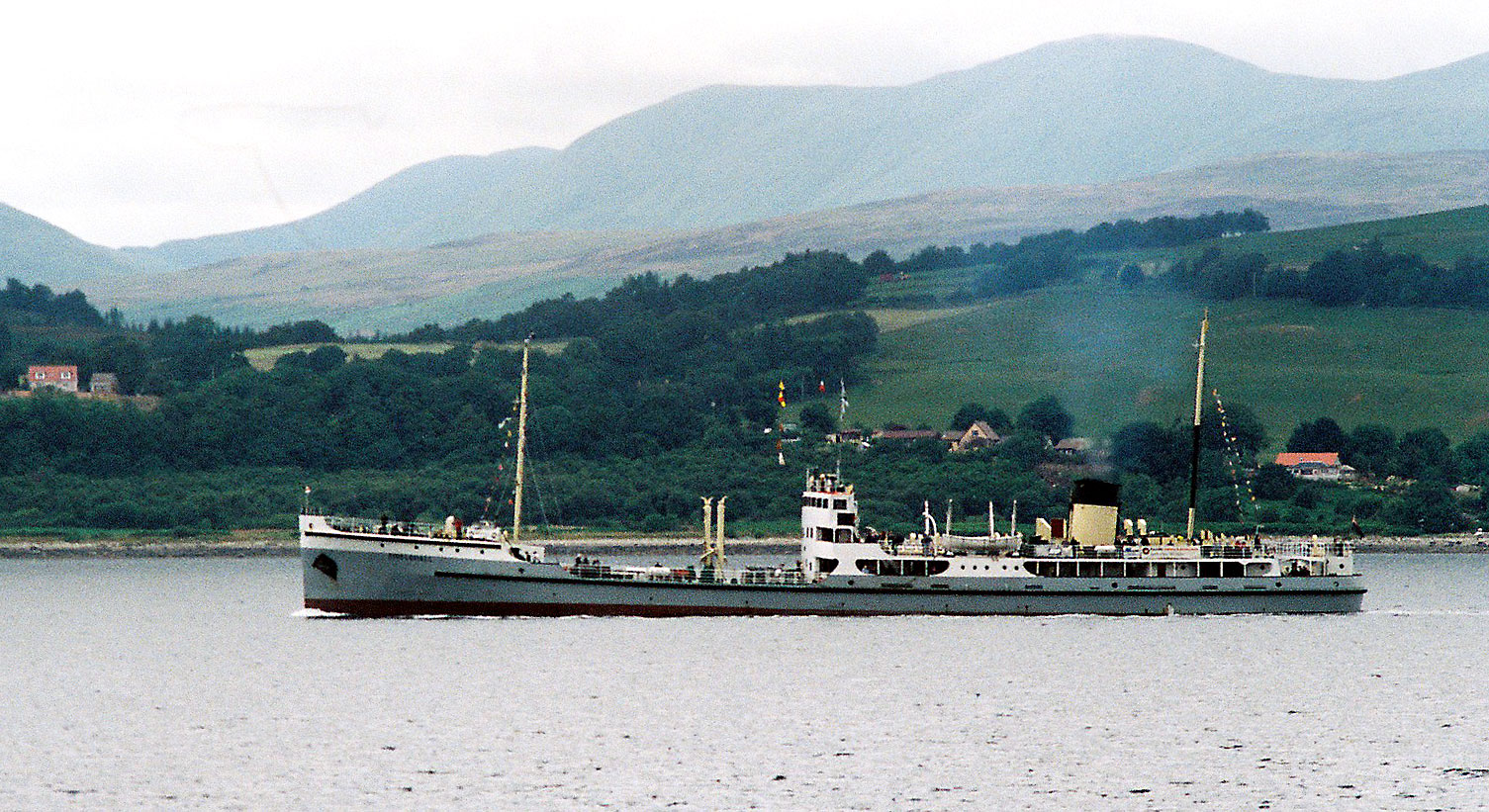
SS Shieldhall, a surviving Lobnitz ship, seen on the Clyde

One late example survives: SS Shieldhall was built as a Clyde sludge boat and launched in 1954. It has reciprocating steam engines, and now operates as a pleasure cruiser on the Solent.

HMS Saxifrage (1918) was a Flower-class sloop, which was the first class of purpose-built anti-submarine warships. She was renamed HMS President in 1921 and served as the London Division Royal Naval Reserve training ship until 1988, before being sold into private ownership. She survives near Blackfriars Bridge on the Victoria Embankment of the River Thames in London, as one of only three remaining World War I British warships and is on the National Historic Ships UK register.

Also still afloat is the William C. Daldy a steam tug (yard number 986, built for the Auckland Harbour Board), where she sailed from the Clyde in 1935/6 and now operating as a pleasure vessel in Auckland, New Zealand.

== Former ships ==
- HMS Slinger (1917) (1917), an experimental catapult ship
- HMS Primrose (K91) (1939)
- HMS Hydra (J275) (1942)
- HMS Pelorus (J291) (1942)
- SS Tuxpam (1944)
- RFA Eddycreek (1953)
- RFA Eddyfirth (1953)
