= Raymond Hart =

Commodore Raymond Hart CBE DSO DSC*
- Born: 24 June 1913; Southampton, Hampshire
- Died: 6 August 1999 (aged 86); Southampton, Hampshire
- Military career
- Allegiance: United Kingdom
- Branch: Royal Navy
- Service years: 1937–1963
- Rank: Commodore
- Units: HMS Hasty; HMS Dainty
- Commands: HMS Vidette; HMS Havelock; HMS Conn; HMS Undine; 6th Frigate Squadron
- Conflicts: World War II • Battle of the Atlantic
- Awards: Commander of the Order of the British Empire; Distinguished Service Order; Distinguished Service Cross & Bar
- Other work: Company director

Commodore Raymond Hart, CBE, DSO, DSC & Bar (24 June 1913 – 6 August 1999) was a British seaman and a Royal Navy officer who served during the Second World War.

== Early life ==
Hart was born in Southampton. He was educated at Oakmount Preparatory School, and later King Edward VI School, Southampton. In 1929, aged 16, he joined the Merchant Navy and in 1937 the Royal Navy.

== Service career ==
At the outbreak of the Second World War Hart was a lieutenant on the destroyer HMS Hasty. In February 1941 he was recommended for bravery during loss of HMS Dainty; he was awarded the DSC for this in December 1941. In December 1942 Hart was appointed commander of destroyer HMS Vidette, assigned to B-7 Escort Group under command of Lt Cdr. P. W. Gretton. In May 1943 during the defence of Convoy ONS 5 Vidette destroyed two U-boats; Hart was later awarded a bar to his DSC. In June he was promoted to lieutenant commander. In October while working as a support group, B-7 assisted in the defence of convoys ON 206, ON 207 and ON 208. Nine U-boats were destroyed in total during these actions; Vidette was credited with two, and Hart was Mentioned in Despatches. In March 1944 he was given command of the destroyer HMS Havelock; in June they destroyed U-767 in the Channel. In September 1944 Hart took command of frigate HMS Conn and 21 Escort Group. Conn was credited with two U-boats destroyed in March 1945, and Hart was later awarded the DSO.

== Later life ==
After the end of hostilities Hart served in a number of sea-going and shore posts, culminating in the command of HMS Undine and of 6th Frigate Squadron in 1957. He was promoted to captain in 1953 and commodore in 1960, before retiring in 1963. Hart was appointed a CBE in 1963. After retirement from the Royal Navy Hart held several positions in the Merchant Navy, being advisor to B&C until 1972, then fleet manager of Cayzer Irvine until 1976, during which time he was director of both companies. In 1974 Hart appeared in the documentary series The World at War, in the episode covering the Battle of the Atlantic.

Hart married in 1945 and had three children; two sons and a daughter. He died in Southampton, where he had lived, in 1999.

== Successes ==
Hart was credited with the destruction of seven U-boats in his war-time service.

Date	U-boat	Type	Location	Notes
6 May 1943	U-630 (Note: Previously thought to have been destroyed on 4 May 1943 by Canso W/5 Sqdn; this attack struck U-209.)	VIIC	NE of Newfoundland; 52°31′N 44°50′W	depth-charged by Vidette (Hart)
6 May 1943	U-531 (Note: Previously credited as U-125: The attack by HMS Oribi and HMS Snowflake, previously credited with U-531, is now believed to have hit U-125.)	IX/C40	NE of Newfoundland; 52°48′N 45°18′W	d/c by Snowflake (Chesterman), Vidette (Hart)
23 October 1943	U-274	VIIC	SW of Iceland; 57°14′N 27°50′W	d/c by Liberator Z/224 Sqdn (Wicht), HMS Duncan (Gretton), Vidette (Hart)
29 October 1943	U-282	VIIC	S of Greenland; 55°28′N 31°57′W	d/c by Vidette (Hart), Sunflower (Plomer)
18 June 1944	U-767	VIIC	English Channel, SW of Guernsey; 49°03′N 03°13′W	Hedgehog, d/c by Fame (Currie), Inconstant (Eaden), Havelock (Hart)
27 March 1945	U-905	VIIC	The Minches, Scotland; 58°34′N 05°46′W	d/c by Conn (Hart), confirmed by "tin-opener" attack later from Escapade. (Note: Previously credited with the destruction of U-965 in this attack.)
30 March 1945	U-965	VIIC	North Minch, Scotland; 58°19′N 05°31′W	Conn (Hart), Rupert (Black) (Note: Previously credited with the destruction of U-1021 in this attack.)
