= German submarine U-1021 =

German World War II submarine

History

Nazi Germany
- Name: U-1021
- Ordered: 13 June 1942
- Builder: Blohm & Voss, Hamburg
- Yard number: 221
- Laid down: 6 May 1943
- Launched: 13 April 1944
- Commissioned: 25 May 1944
- Fate: Sunk on 14 March 1945

General characteristics
- Class & type: Type VIIC/41 submarine
- Displacement: 759 tonnes (747 long tons) surfaced; 860 t (846 long tons) submerged
- Length: 67.10 m (220 ft 2 in) o/a; 50.50 m (165 ft 8 in) pressure hull
- Beam: 6.20 m (20 ft 4 in) o/a; 4.70 m (15 ft 5 in) pressure hull
- Height: 9.60 m (31 ft 6 in)
- Draught: 4.74 m (15 ft 7 in)
- Installed power: 2,800–3,200 PS (2,100–2,400 kW; 2,800–3,200 bhp) (diesels); 750 PS (550 kW; 740 shp) (electric)
- Propulsion: 2 shafts; 2 × diesel engines; 2 × electric motors
- Speed: 17.7 knots (32.8 km/h; 20.4 mph) surfaced; 7.6 knots (14.1 km/h; 8.7 mph) submerged
- Range: 8,500 nmi (15,700 km; 9,800 mi) at 10 knots (19 km/h; 12 mph) surfaced; 80 nmi (150 km; 92 mi) at 4 knots (7.4 km/h; 4.6 mph) submerged
- Test depth: 250 m (820 ft); Crush depth: 275–325 m (902–1,066 ft)
- Complement: 4 officers, 40–56 enlisted
- Armament: 5 × 53.3 cm (21 in) torpedo tubes (4 bow, 1 stern); 14 × torpedoes; 1 × 8.8 cm (3.46 in) deck gun (220 rounds); 1 × 3.7 cm (1.5 in) Flak M42 AA gun; 2 × 2 cm (0.79 in) C/30 AA guns

Service record
- Part of: 31st U-boat Flotilla; 25 May – 30 November 1944; 11th U-boat Flotilla; 1 December 1944 – 14 March 1945
- Identification codes: M 23 789
- Commanders: Oblt.z.S. William Holpert; 25 May 1944 – 14 March 1945
- Operations: 1 patrol: 20 February – 14 March 1945
- Victories: None

German submarine U-1021 was a Type VIIC/41 U-boat of Nazi Germany's Kriegsmarine during World War II.

Laid down on 6 May 1943 at the Blohm & Voss yard in Hamburg, the submarine was launched on 13 April 1944, and commissioned on 25 May 1944, under the command of Oberleutnant zur See William Holpert.

== Design ==
German Type VIIC/41 submarines were preceded by the heavier Type VIIC submarines. U-1021 had a displacement of 759 tonnes (747 long tons) when at the surface and 860 tonnes (850 long tons) while submerged. She had a total length of 67.10 m (220 ft 2 in), a pressure hull length of 50.50 m (165 ft 8 in), a beam of 6.20 m (20 ft 4 in), a height of 9.60 m (31 ft 6 in), and a draught of 4.74 m (15 ft 7 in). The submarine was powered by two Germaniawerft F46 four-stroke, six-cylinder supercharged diesel engines producing a total of 2,800 to 3,200 metric horsepower (2,060 to 2,350 kW; 2,760 to 3,160 shp) for use while surfaced, two Brown, Boveri & Cie GG UB 720/8 double-acting electric motors producing a total of 750 metric horsepower (550 kW; 740 shp) for use while submerged. She had two shafts and two 1.23 m (4 ft) propellers. The boat was capable of operating at depths of up to 230 metres (750 ft).

The submarine had a maximum surface speed of 17.7 knots (32.8 km/h; 20.4 mph) and a maximum submerged speed of 7.6 knots (14.1 km/h; 8.7 mph). When submerged, the boat could operate for 80 nautical miles (150 km; 92 mi) at 4 knots (7.4 km/h; 4.6 mph); when surfaced, she could travel 8,500 nautical miles (15,700 km; 9,800 mi) at 10 knots (19 km/h; 12 mph). U-1021 was fitted with five 53.3 cm (21 in) torpedo tubes (four fitted at the bow and one at the stern), fourteen torpedoes, one 8.8 cm (3.46 in) SK C/35 naval gun, (220 rounds), one 3.7 cm (1.5 in) Flak M42 and two 2 cm (0.79 in) C/30 anti-aircraft guns. The boat had a complement of between forty-four and sixty.

== Sensors ==
=== Passive sonar ===
U-1021 was one of only ten Type VIIC's to be fitted with a Balkongerät (literally 'Balcony apparatus or equipment'). The Balkongerät was used on U-boats (U-682, U-788, U-799, U-997, U-1105, U-1172, U-1306, U-1307 and U-1308). The Balkongerät was standard on the Type XXI and the Type XXIII. Nonetheless, it was also fitted to several Type IXs and one Type X. The Balkongerät was an improved version of Gruppenhorchgerät (GHG) (group listening device) with double the hydrophones.

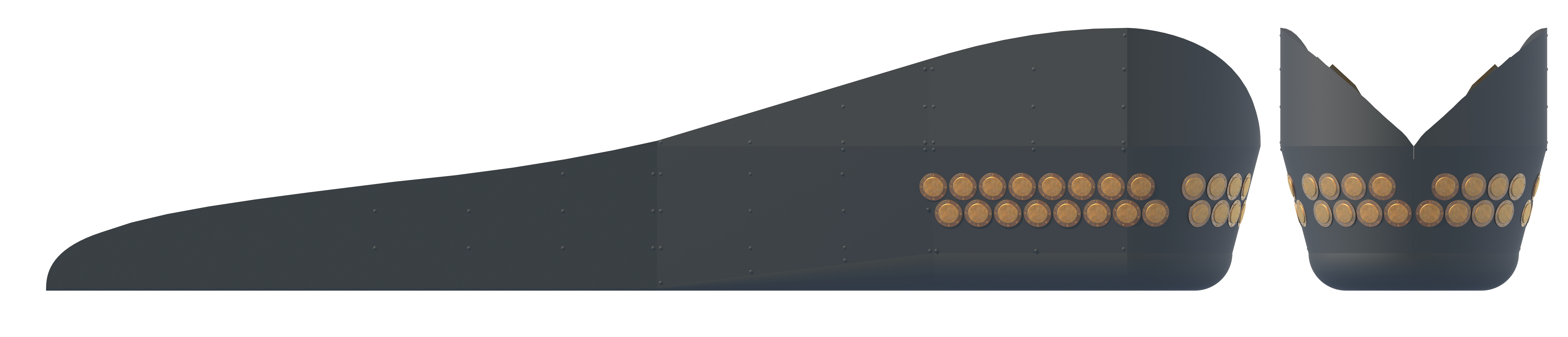
The outside view of the German design of Balcongerät installed on Type VIIC's

== Service history ==
U-1021 served with 31st U-boat Flotilla, a training unit, and later with 11th U-boat Flotilla from 1 December 1944 until its disappearance in March 1945.

=== Patrol and loss ===
U-1021 sailed from Bergen on 20 February 1945 and headed for the waters around Land's End.

U-1021 was presumed to have been sunk on 30 March 1945 in The Minch in the Hebrides, by depth charges from the British frigates HMS Rupert and HMS Conn.

=== Discovery ===
However, the wreck of U-1021 was identified by nautical archaeologist Innes McCartney and historian Axel Niestle in December 2006, 7 nautical miles (13 km) off Newquay, Cornwall, at position 50°33.3′N 5°11.6′W, close to two other U-boats, U-325 and U-400. Further research by Innes McCartney led to the conclusion that all three submarines were sunk in the Bristol Channel by a deep-trap minefield. Minefield "HW A3", which was fatal to U-1021, was laid by HMS Apollo on 3 December 1944.

The attack of 30 March 1945 previously assumed to have sunk U-1021 is now believed to have sunk U-965.

== See also ==
- Battle of the Atlantic (1939-1945)

== Bibliography ==
- Busch, Rainer; Röll, Hans-Joachim (1999). German U-boat commanders of World War II : a biographical dictionary. Translated by Brooks, Geoffrey. London, Annapolis, Md: Greenhill Books, Naval Institute Press. ISBN 1-55750-186-6.
- Busch, Rainer; Röll, Hans-Joachim (1999). Deutsche U-Boot-Verluste von September 1939 bis Mai 1945 [German U-boat losses from September 1939 to May 1945]. Der U-Boot-Krieg (in German). Vol. IV. Hamburg, Berlin, Bonn: Mittler. ISBN 3-8132-0514-2.
- Gröner, Erich; Jung, Dieter; Maass, Martin (1991). German Warships 1815–1945, U-boats and Mine Warfare Vessels. Vol. 2. Translated by Thomas, Keith; Magowan, Rachel. London: Conway Maritime Press. ISBN 0-85177-593-4.
