= German submarine U-997 =

German World War II submarine

- U-995 Type VIIC/41 at the Laboe Naval Memorial. This U-boat is almost identical to U-997.

History

Nazi Germany
- Name: U-997
- Ordered: 14 October 1941
- Builder: Blohm & Voss AG, Hamburg
- Yard number: 197
- Laid down: 7 December 1942
- Launched: 18 August 1943
- Commissioned: 23 September 1943
- Fate: Surrendered on 9 May 1945 at Narvik, Norway; Sunk on 13 December 1945 during Operation Deadlight

General characteristics
- Class & type: Type VIIC/41 submarine
- Displacement: 759 tonnes (747 long tons) surfaced; 860 t (846 long tons) submerged
- Length: 67.23 m (220 ft 7 in) o/a; 50.50 m (165 ft 8 in) pressure hull
- Beam: 6.20 m (20 ft 4 in) o/a; 4.70 m (15 ft 5 in) pressure hull
- Height: 9.60 m (31 ft 6 in)
- Draught: 4.74 m (15 ft 7 in)
- Installed power: 2,800–3,200 PS (2,100–2,400 kW; 2,800–3,200 bhp) (diesels); 750 PS (550 kW; 740 shp) (electric)
- Propulsion: 2 shafts; 2 × diesel engines; 2 × electric motors
- Speed: 17.7 knots (32.8 km/h; 20.4 mph) surfaced; 7.6 knots (14.1 km/h; 8.7 mph) submerged
- Range: 8,500 nmi (15,700 km; 9,800 mi) at 10 knots (19 km/h; 12 mph) surfaced; 80 nmi (150 km; 92 mi) at 4 knots (7.4 km/h; 4.6 mph) submerged
- Test depth: 230 m (750 ft); Calculated crush depth: 250–295 m (820–968 ft)
- Complement: 44-52 officers & ratings
- Armament: 5 × 53.3 cm (21 in) torpedo tubes (4 bow, 1 stern); 14 × torpedoes; 1 × 3.7 cm (1.5 in) Flak M42 AA gun; 2 × 2 cm (0.79 in) C/30 AA guns

Service record
- Part of: 5th U-boat Flotilla; 23 September 1943 – 30 April 1944; 9th U-boat Flotilla; 1 – 31 May 1944; 13th U-boat Flotilla; 1 June 1944 – 1 March 1945; 14th U-boat Flotilla; 1 March – 8 May 1945
- Identification codes: M 55 164
- Commanders: Oblt.z.S. Hans Lehmann; 23 September 1943 – 9 May 1945
- Operations: 7 patrols: 1st patrol: a. 25 May – 22 June 1944; b. 18 – 20 July 1944; 2nd patrol: 6 August – 2 September 1944; 3rd patrol: a. 13 September – 2 October 1944; b. 8 – 10 October 1944; 4th patrol: 14 October – 9 November 1944; 5th patrol: a. 21 November – 26 December 1944; b. 27 – 29 December 1944; c. 22 – 26 February 1945; d. 7 – 8 March 1945; 6th patrol: 12 – 24 March 1945; 7th patrol: a. 17 – 30 April 1945; b. 12 May 1945; c. 15 – 19 May 1945
- Victories: 1 merchant ship sunk (1,603 GRT); 1 warship sunk (105 tons); 1 merchant ship damaged (4,287 GRT)

German submarine U-997 was a Type VIIC/41 U-boat built for Nazi Germany's Kriegsmarine for service during World War II. She was laid down on 7 December 1942 by Blohm & Voss, Hamburg as yard number 197, launched on 18 August 1943 and commissioned on 23 September 1943 under Oberleutnant zur See Hans Lehmann.

== Design ==
Like all Type VIIC/41 U-boats, U-977 had a displacement of 759 tonnes (747 long tons) when at the surface and 860 tonnes (850 long tons) while submerged. She had a total length of 67.10 m (220 ft 2 in), a pressure hull length of 50.50 m (165 ft 8 in), a beam of 6.20 m (20 ft 4 in), and a draught of 4.74 m (15 ft 7 in). The submarine was powered by two Germaniawerft F46 supercharged six-cylinder four-stroke diesel engines producing a total of 2,800 to 3,200 metric horsepower (2,060 to 2,350 kW; 2,760 to 3,160 shp) and two BBC GG UB 720/8 double-acting electric motors producing a total of 750 metric horsepower (550 kW; 740 shp) for use while submerged. The boat was capable of operating at a depth of 250 metres (820 ft).

The submarine had a maximum surface speed of 17.7 knots (32.8 km/h; 20.4 mph) and a submerged speed of 7.6 knots (14.1 km/h; 8.7 mph). When submerged, the boat could operate for 80 nautical miles (150 km; 92 mi) at 4 knots (7.4 km/h; 4.6 mph); when surfaced, she could travel 8,500 nautical miles (15,700 km; 9,800 mi) at 10 knots (19 km/h; 12 mph). U-997 was fitted with three anti-aircraft guns, five 53.3 cm (21 in) torpedo tubes (four on the bow and one on the stern) and fourteen torpedoes. Its complement was between forty-four and sixty.

== Sensors ==
=== Passive sonar ===
U-997 was one of only ten Type VIIC's to be fitted with a Balkongerät (literally 'Balcony apparatus or equipment'). The Balkongerät was used on U-boats (U-682, U-788, U-799, U-1021, U-1105, U-1172, U-1306, U-1307 and U-1308). The Balkongerät was standard on the Type XXI and the Type XXIII. Nonetheless, it was also fitted to several Type IXs and one Type X. The Balkongerät was an improved version of Gruppenhorchgerät (GHG) (group listening device). The GHG had 24 hydrophones, the Balkongerät had 48 hydrophones and improved electronics, which enabled more accurate readings to be taken.

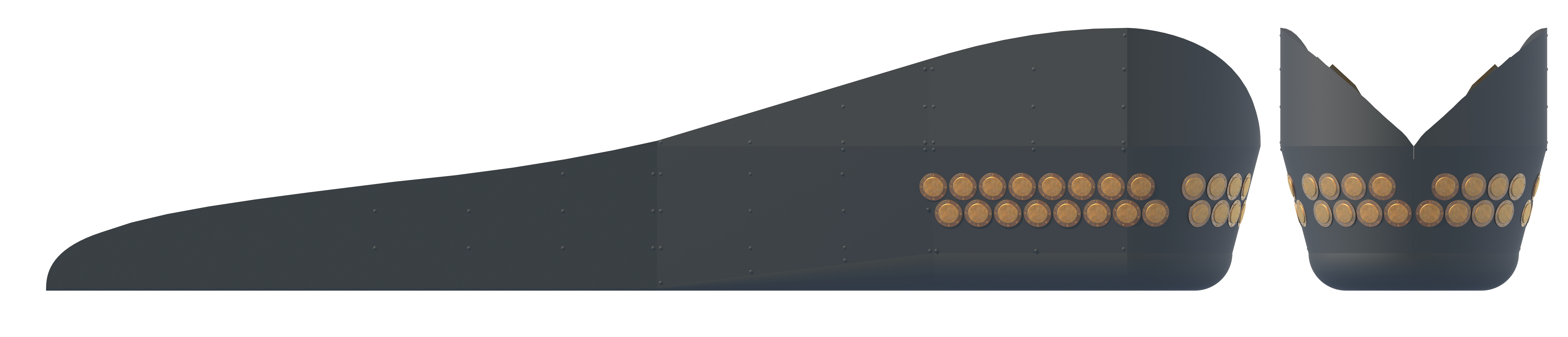
The outside view of the German design of Balcongerät installed on Type VIIC's

== Service history ==
The boat's service career began on 23 September 1943 with the 5th Training Flotilla, followed by 12 months active service, with a succession of three flotillas, namely 9th Flotilla on 1 May 1944, then 13th Flotilla on 1 June 1944, and finally with 14th Flotilla on 1 March 1945.

=== Wolfpacks ===
U-997 took part in seven wolfpacks, namely:

- Grimm (31 May – 6 June 1944)
- Trutz (17 August – 1 September 1944)
- Grimm (13 September – 1 October 1944)
- Regenschirm (14 – 16 October 1944)
- Panther (16 October – 8 November 1944)
- Stier (21 November – 25 December 1944)
- Hagen (15 – 21 March 1945)

=== Fate ===
U-997 was surrendered on 9 May 1945 and was sunk by aircraft on 13 December 1945 in the North Atlantic, in position 55°50′N 10°05′W, as part of Operation Deadlight.

== Summary of raiding history ==
Date	Ship Name	Nationality	Tonnage (Note: Merchant ship tonnages are in gross register tons. Military vessels are listed by tons displacement.)	Fate
7 December 1944	BO-229	Soviet Navy	105	Sunk
22 April 1945	Idefjord	Norway	4,287	Damaged
22 April 1945	Onega	Soviet Union	1,603	Sunk

== See also ==
- Battle of the Atlantic

== Bibliography ==
- Busch, Rainer; Röll, Hans-Joachim (1999). German U-boat commanders of World War II : a biographical dictionary. Translated by Brooks, Geoffrey. London, Annapolis, Md: Greenhill Books, Naval Institute Press. ISBN 1-55750-186-6.
- Gröner, Erich; Jung, Dieter; Maass, Martin (1991). U-boats and Mine Warfare Vessels. German Warships 1815–1945. Vol. 2. Translated by Thomas, Keith; Magowan, Rachel. London: Conway Maritime Press. ISBN 0-85177-593-4.
