= HMS Apollo (M01) =

Abdiel-class minelayer of the British Royal Navy

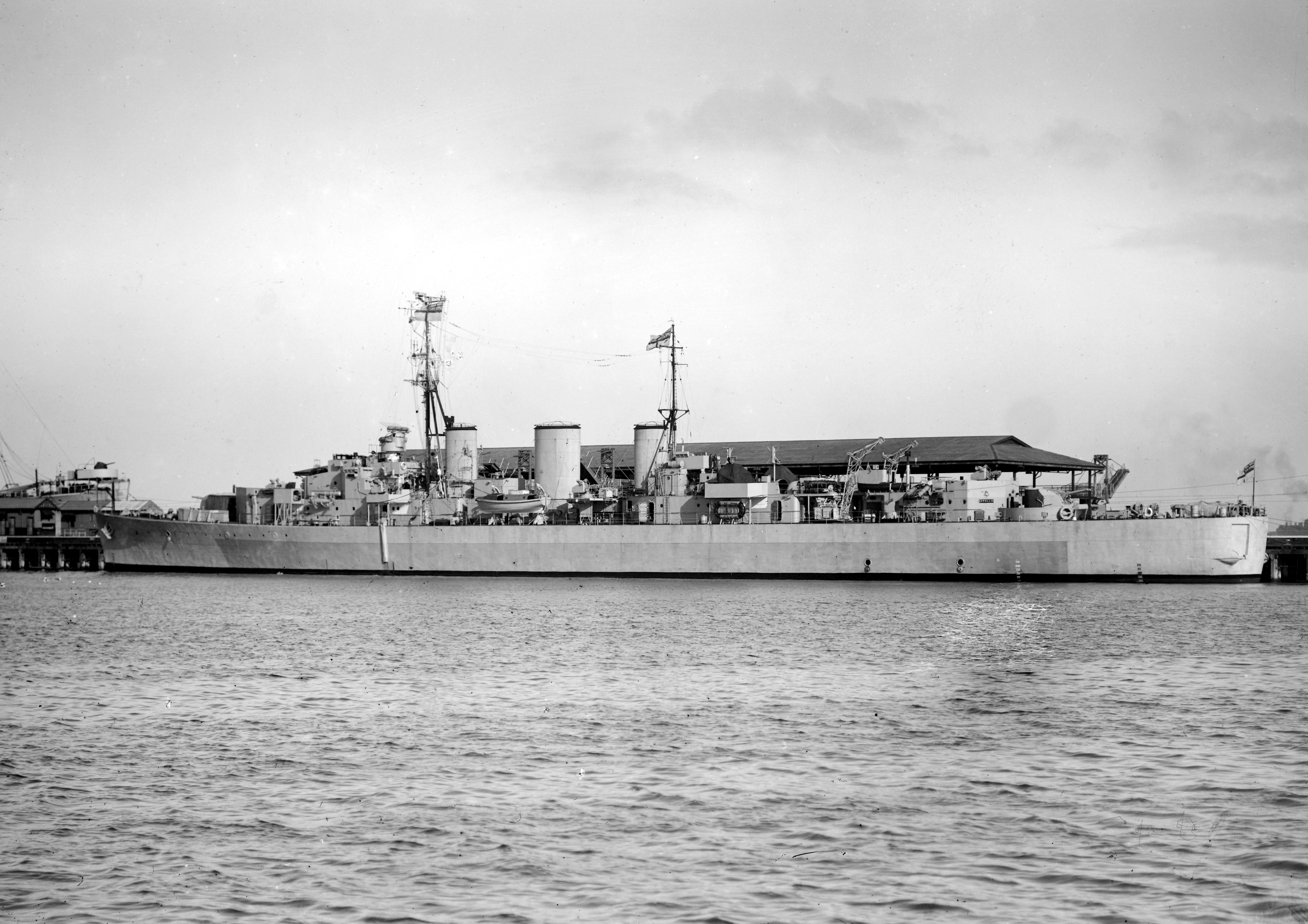
- Apollo in August, 1945

History

United Kingdom
- Name: Apollo
- Namesake: Apollo
- Ordered: 1940
- Builder: Hawthorn Leslie, Hebburn
- Laid down: 10 October 1941
- Launched: 5 April 1943
- Completed: 12 February 1944
- Commissioned: 1944
- Decommissioned: 1946
- Recommissioned: 1951
- Decommissioned: 1961
- Identification: Pennant number M01/N01
- Motto: Fortis et benignus; ("Strong and kindly (or merciful)")
- Honours and awards: NORMANDY 1944
- Fate: Sold for scrapping, 1962
- Badge: On a field Blue, a sun in splendour Gold

General characteristics
- Class & type: Abdiel-class minelayer
- Displacement: 2,650 long tons (2,693 t) standard; 4,000 long tons (4,064 t) full load
- Length: 418 ft (127 m)
- Beam: 40 ft (12 m)
- Draught: 16 ft (4.9 m)
- Propulsion: 4 × Admiralty 3-drum boilers; Geared turbines; 2 shafts; 72,000 shp (53,690 kW)
- Speed: 40 knots (74 km/h; 46 mph)
- Range: 1,000 nmi (1,900 km) at 38 kn (70 km/h; 44 mph)
- Complement: 242
- Armament: 4 × 4-inch (100 mm) AA guns (2×2); 4 × Bofors 40 mm guns (2×2); 12 × Oerlikon 20 mm cannons (6×2); 160 × Naval mines

HMS Apollo was an Abdiel-class minelayer of the Royal Navy, the eighth RN ship to carry the name. She served with the Home Fleet during World War II, taking part in the Normandy Landings before being transferred to the British Pacific Fleet. Put into reserve in 1946, she was recommissioned in 1951, serving until 1961, and was sold for scrapping in 1962.

== Service history ==
=== 1944 ===
Commissioned after sea trials in February 1944 Apollo joined the Home Fleet at Scapa Flow before setting out for Plymouth for minelaying operations in support of the planned invasion of France. Loading mines at Milford Haven she commenced a series of operations off the French coast of Brittany between Ushant and Île Vierge.

She was detached for duty in "Operation Neptune" and on 7 June (D-Day+1) she embarked Allied Supreme Commander General Dwight D. Eisenhower, Naval Commander in Chief Admiral Bertram Ramsay, General Bernard Law Montgomery and staff officers from SHAEF, to visit the assault areas. Unfortunately the minelayer grounded while underway, damaging her propellers, and her passengers were transferred to the destroyer Undaunted.

Apollo took passage to Sheerness and then to the Tyne for repairs, which were completed in September. The ship was then transferred to Western Approaches Command, and deployed in the South-Western Approaches laying deep trap minefields as a countermeasure to U-boat activities in inshore waters. With minelayer Plover she laid more than 1200 Mk XVII moored mines across the coastal convoy route along the north coast of Cornwall. She started on 29 November 1944 with minefield "HW A1" – this minefield was later fatal to the submarine U-325. On 3 December she laid minefield "HW A3" east of "HW A1". This minefield was later fatal to the submarine U-1021.

On 24 December she was transferred to the Home Fleet for minelaying duty off Norway, operating off Utsira in January, accompanied by the destroyers Zealous and Carron.

=== 1945 ===
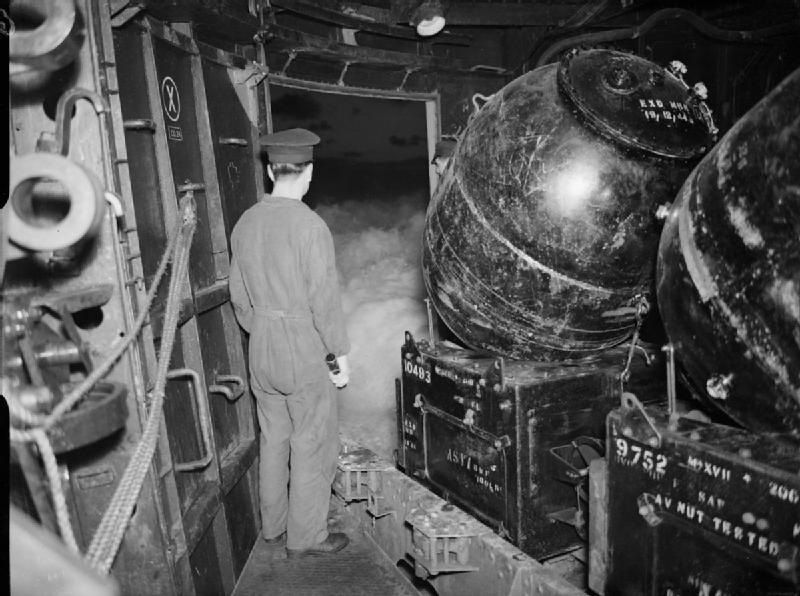
Apollo laying mines off Norway

On 15 January 1945 she returned to the Western Approaches for minelaying in the Irish Sea. On 13 April Apollo rejoined the Home Fleet for a minelaying operation in the Russian Kola Inlet ("Operation Trammel") as part of "Force 5" with destroyers Opportune, Orwell and Obedient, rejoining the Home Fleet in May.

After the end of the war in Europe Apollo sailed to Oslo in company with sister ship Ariadne and heavy cruiser Devonshire, returning the Norwegian Government-in-Exile and Crown Prince Olav.

On her return Apollo prepared for service with the British Pacific Fleet, departing from Portsmouth at the end of June. After exercises with the Mediterranean Fleet at Malta in July, she finally arrived at Melbourne on 1 August, by which time her services were no longer required, as the Japanese surrendered on the 15th.

=== 1948–1961 ===
In 1948 her pennant number was changed from M01 to N01.

Apollo was recommissioned in 1951 after the outbreak of the Korean War, joining the 2nd Cruiser Squadron of the Home Fleet. After Hurricane Charlie struck Jamaica on 17 August 1951, Apollo made a high speed run to deliver relief supplies to the island. In 1953 she took part in the Fleet Review to celebrate the Coronation of Queen Elizabeth II, while in November 1954 she became the Flagship of the Commander-in-Chief, Home Fleet. On 25 August 1960, the destroyer Battleaxe was carrying out steam trials while moored alongside Apollo at Portsmouth, when steam was let into Battleaxe's turbines, driving the ship forward and breaking Apollo's mooring lines. Apollo then collided with the frigate Wakeful, which also broke free from her moorings and struck the caisson at the entrance to a dock. Apollo's stem was damaged, while Wakeful suffered buckled plates from the impact by Apollo and a badly damaged bow from the collision with the caisson.

She was paid off and returned to the Reserve in 1961, was put on the Disposal List the next year, and sold for breaking-up by Hughes Bolckow at Blyth, Northumberland, where she arrived in November 1962.

== Publications ==
- Colledge, J. J.; Warlow, Ben (2006) [1969]. Ships of the Royal Navy: The Complete Record of All Fighting Ships of the Royal Navy from the 15th Century to the Present (3rd Rev ed.). London: Chatham Publishing. ISBN 978-1-86176-281-8. OCLC 67375475.
- Nicholson, Arthur (2015). Very Special Ships: Abdiel-Class Fast Minelayers of World War Two. Barnsley, UK: Seaforth Publishing. ISBN 978-1-84832-235-6.
