= German submarine U-400 =

German world war II submarine

History

Nazi Germany
- Name: U-400
- Ordered: 25 August 1941
- Builder: Howaldtswerke, Kiel
- Yard number: 32
- Laid down: 18 November 1942
- Launched: 8 January 1944
- Commissioned: 18 March 1944
- Fate: Sunk on 15 December 1944

General characteristics
- Class & type: Type VIIC submarine
- Displacement: 769 tonnes (757 long tons) surfaced; 871 t (857 long tons) submerged
- Length: 67.23 m (220 ft 7 in) o/a; 50.50 m (165 ft 8 in) pressure hull
- Beam: 6.20 m (20 ft 4 in) o/a; 4.70 m (15 ft 5 in) pressure hull
- Height: 9.60 m (31 ft 6 in)
- Draught: 4.74 m (15 ft 7 in)
- Installed power: 2,800–3,200 PS (2,100–2,400 kW; 2,800–3,200 bhp) (diesels); 750 PS (550 kW; 740 shp) (electric)
- Propulsion: 2 shafts; 2 × diesel engines; 2 × electric motors
- Speed: 17.7 knots (32.8 km/h; 20.4 mph) surfaced; 7.6 knots (14.1 km/h; 8.7 mph) submerged
- Range: 8,500 nmi (15,700 km; 9,800 mi) at 10 knots (19 km/h; 12 mph) surfaced; 80 nmi (150 km; 92 mi) at 4 knots (7.4 km/h; 4.6 mph) submerged
- Test depth: 230 m (750 ft); Crush depth: 250–295 m (820–968 ft)
- Complement: 4 officers, 40–56 enlisted
- Armament: 5 × 53.3 cm (21 in) torpedo tubes (four bow, one stern); 14 × torpedoes; 1 × 3.7 cm (1.5 in) Flak M42 AA gun; 2 × twin 2 cm (0.79 in) C/30 anti-aircraft guns

Service record
- Part of: 5th U-boat Flotilla; 18 March – 31 October 1944; 11th U-boat Flotilla; 1 November – 15 December 1944
- Identification codes: M 49 932
- Commanders: Kptlt. Horst Creutz; 18 March – 15 December 1944
- Operations: 1 patrol: a. 15 – 16 November 1944; b. 18 November – 15 December 1944
- Victories: None

German submarine U-400 was a Type VIIC U-boat of Nazi Germany's Kriegsmarine during World War II.

The submarine was laid down on 18 November 1942 at the Howaldtswerke yard in Kiel as yard number 32, launched on 8 January 1944 and commissioned on 18 March under the command of Kapitänleutnant Horst Creutz.

== Design ==
German Type VIIC submarines were preceded by the shorter Type VIIB submarines. U-400 had a displacement of 769 tonnes (757 long tons) when at the surface and 871 tonnes (857 long tons) while submerged. She had a total length of 67.10 m (220 ft 2 in), a pressure hull length of 50.50 m (165 ft 8 in), a beam of 6.20 m (20 ft 4 in), a height of 9.60 m (31 ft 6 in), and a draught of 4.74 m (15 ft 7 in). The submarine was powered by two Germaniawerft F46 four-stroke, six-cylinder supercharged diesel engines producing a total of 2,800 to 3,200 metric horsepower (2,060 to 2,350 kW; 2,760 to 3,160 shp) for use while surfaced, two Garbe, Lahmeyer & Co. RP 137/c double-acting electric motors producing a total of 750 metric horsepower (550 kW; 740 shp) for use while submerged. She had two shafts and two 1.23 m (4 ft) propellers. The boat was capable of operating at depths of up to 230 metres (750 ft).

The submarine had a maximum surface speed of 17.7 knots (32.8 km/h; 20.4 mph) and a maximum submerged speed of 7.6 knots (14.1 km/h; 8.7 mph). When submerged, the boat could operate for 80 nautical miles (150 km; 92 mi) at 4 knots (7.4 km/h; 4.6 mph); when surfaced, she could travel 8,500 nautical miles (15,700 km; 9,800 mi) at 10 knots (19 km/h; 12 mph). U-400 was fitted with five 53.3 cm (21 in) torpedo tubes (four fitted at the bow and one at the stern), fourteen torpedoes, one 3.7 cm (1.5 in) Flak M42 and two twin 2 cm (0.79 in) C/30 anti-aircraft guns. The boat had a complement of between forty-four and sixty.

== Service history ==
After training with the 5th U-boat Flotilla, U-400 was attached to the 11th U-boat Flotilla for front-line service on 1 November 1944.

The U-boat sailed from Horten Naval Base in Norway for her first war patrol on 15 November 1944, and headed for the waters off Land's End. Despite repeated requests for reports by the German U-boat Command, none were received. The U-boat was eventually listed as "missing" at the end of January 1945. After the war, the Allies attributed the loss of U-400 to a depth charge attack by the frigate HMS Nyasaland on 17 December 1944, about 30 nautical miles (56 km) SE of Kinsale, Ireland.

=== Discovery ===
The wreck of U-400 was finally identified by nautical archaeologist Innes McCartney and historian Axel Niestle in 2006, about 10 miles (16 km) north-west of Padstow, Cornwall, at position 50°39.9′N 5°5′W close to the wrecks of two other U-boats, U-325 and U-1021. All three submarines were sunk in the Bristol Channel by a deep-trap minefield.

The U-boat sunk by Nyasaland is now believed to have been U-772.

=== Previously recorded fate ===
U-400 was noted as sunk in mid-December 1944 in the British minefield 'HX A1' off the Cornish coast.

== Bibliography ==
- Busch, Rainer; Röll, Hans-Joachim (1999). German U-boat commanders of World War II : a biographical dictionary. Translated by Brooks, Geoffrey. London, Annapolis, Md: Greenhill Books, Naval Institute Press. ISBN 1-55750-186-6.
- Busch, Rainer; Röll, Hans-Joachim (1999). Deutsche U-Boot-Verluste von September 1939 bis Mai 1945 [German U-boat losses from September 1939 to May 1945]. Der U-Boot-Krieg (in German). Vol. IV. Hamburg, Berlin, Bonn: Mittler. ISBN 3-8132-0514-2.
- Gröner, Erich; Jung, Dieter; Maass, Martin (1991). U-boats and Mine Warfare Vessels. German Warships 1815–1945. Vol. 2. Translated by Thomas, Keith; Magowan, Rachel. London: Conway Maritime Press. ISBN 0-85177-593-4.
