= German submarine U-1308 =

German World War II submarine

History

Nazi Germany
- Name: U-1308
- Ordered: 1 August 1942
- Builder: Flensburger Schiffbau-Gesellschaft; Flensburg
- Yard number: 501
- Laid down: 16 February 1944
- Launched: 22 November 1944
- Commissioned: 17 January 1945
- Home port: Stettin
- Fate: Scuttled on 1 May 1945; Raised in February 1953, broken up at Neptun Dockyard, Rostock
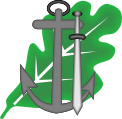
- Badge

General characteristics
- Type: Type VIIC/41 submarine
- Displacement: 759 tonnes (747 long tons) surfaced; 860 t (846 long tons) submerged
- Length: 67.10 m (220 ft 2 in) o/a; 50.50 m (165 ft 8 in) pressure hull
- Beam: 6.20 m (20 ft 4 in) o/a; 4.70 m (15 ft 5 in) pressure hull
- Height: 9.60 m (31 ft 6 in)
- Draught: 4.72 m (15 ft 6 in)
- Installed power: 2,800–3,200 PS (2,100–2,400 kW; 2,800–3,200 bhp) (diesels); 750 PS (550 kW; 740 shp) (electric)
- Propulsion: 2 shafts; 2 × diesel engines; 2 × electric motors
- Speed: 17.7 knots (32.8 km/h; 20.4 mph) surfaced; 7.6 knots (14.1 km/h; 8.7 mph) submerged
- Range: 8,500 nmi (15,700 km; 9,800 mi) at 10 knots (19 km/h; 12 mph) surfaced; 80 nmi (150 km; 92 mi) at 4 knots (7.4 km/h; 4.6 mph) submerged
- Test depth: 230 m (750 ft); Calculated crush depth: 250–295 m (820–968 ft)
- Complement: 4 officers, 40-48 enlisted
- Sensors & processing systems: Passive sonar
- Armament: 5 × 53.3 cm (21 in) torpedo tubes (four bow, one stern); 14 × torpedoes; 1 × 8.8 cm (3.46 in) deck gun (220 rounds); various AA guns

Service record
- Part of: 4th U-boat Flotilla; 17 January – 1 May 1945
- Identification codes: M 49 123
- Commanders: Oblt.z.S. Heinrich Besold; 17 January – 1 May 1945
- Operations: None
- Victories: None

German submarine U-1308 was the last Type VIIC/41 submarine to be laid down, launched and commissioned by Nazi Germany's Kriegsmarine during World War II. The Oberkommando der Marine or OKM, (the German naval high command), had decided near the end of World War II to put all of its resources into building newer types of Unterseeboot, such as the types XXI and XXIII. U-1308 was part of a batch of eight U-boats (U-1301 to U-1308) ordered on 1 August 1942 to be built at Flensburger Schiffbau-Gesellschaft, Flensburg (54°48′30″N 9°26′07″E). She was laid down on 16 February 1944 and launched on 22 November. The eight boats were commissioned over a 12-month period between February 1944 and 17 January 1945 .

As U-1308 was the last Type VII, the Kriegsmarine fitted her out to be one of the most advanced. U-1308 was one of nine Type VIIs fitted with an experimental synthetic rubber skin of anechoic tiles known as Alberich, which had been designed to counter the Allies' asdic/sonar devices. U-1308 was also one of two Type VIIC/41s equipped with a new design of passive sonar hydrophones, thus increasing detection ranges by approximately 70% over the older designs.

A few days before Germany surrendered on 8 May 1945, U-1308 was taken approximately 5 km (2.7 nmi) north-west of Warnemünde and scuttled on 1 May at approximately 54°13′00″N 12°02′00″E as part of Operation Regenbogen, to avoid her surrender. During the final days of Nazi Germany there was a plethora of U-boats which suffered the same fate. In the last week of the war, 28 other boats joined her.

She would not remain on the sea floor for long however, as she was salvaged in February 1953 for potential use in East Germany's fledgling U-boat program. However, U-1308 would ultimately be scrapped in mid 1953 following the abandonment of the East Germany's plans for a U-boat fleet.

== Emblem ==
U-1308's emblem was an oak leaf, with an anchor and a knife or dagger. She shared this emblem with U-3, U-29, U-120, U-747 and U-1274.

== Complement ==
=== Commander ===
Heinrich Besold was born on 18 October 1920 in Nürnberg. He entered the navy as Offiziersanwärter (16 September 1939), rising to Fähnrich zur See (1 July 1940), Oberfähnrich zur See (1 July 1941), Leutnant zur See (1 March 1942) and Oberleutnant zur See (1 October 1943). He also served aboard two other U-boats, U-981 between March and May 1944 and U-518 between July and November 1944. He commanded U-1308 during her working-up at the 4th U-boat Flotilla. He was decorated on 29 October 1944 with the Iron Cross 2nd Class and the U-boat War Badge in 1939.

== Bridge ==
The bridge was equipped with a UZO (Überwasserzieloptik) pedestal located forward. While making a surface attack, a set of large, heavy binoculars were mounted on top of the pedestal. Information of the bearing to the target was transmitted to the control room, where an electro-mechanical computer calculated the exact angle for firing the torpedoes. Sometime late in World War II, an updated version of the UZO entered service with the Type VIIC boats. U-1308 would have mounted the latest version.

U-1308, like most Type VIIs, IXs and XXIs, was equipped with two periscopes, one for the attack, the second for the purposes of navigation and search. This observation periscope was frequently used during twilight and night attacks, as it let in more light and had better light transmission. The observation periscope had two magnifications – 1.5× and 6×. The attack periscope was used exclusively for that purpose. To make it less visible to the enemy and to reduce the wake, the periscope head and neck-size were keep to a minimum. The attack periscope was fitted with a heating system that served to prevent fogging of the lenses.

U-1308's Direction Finder Antenna Loop was located on the starboard side of the bridge. It was used to detect and get bearings from the radio signals of Allied surface ships. U-1308 would have been outfitted with a late-war version which look slightly different from the earlier model.

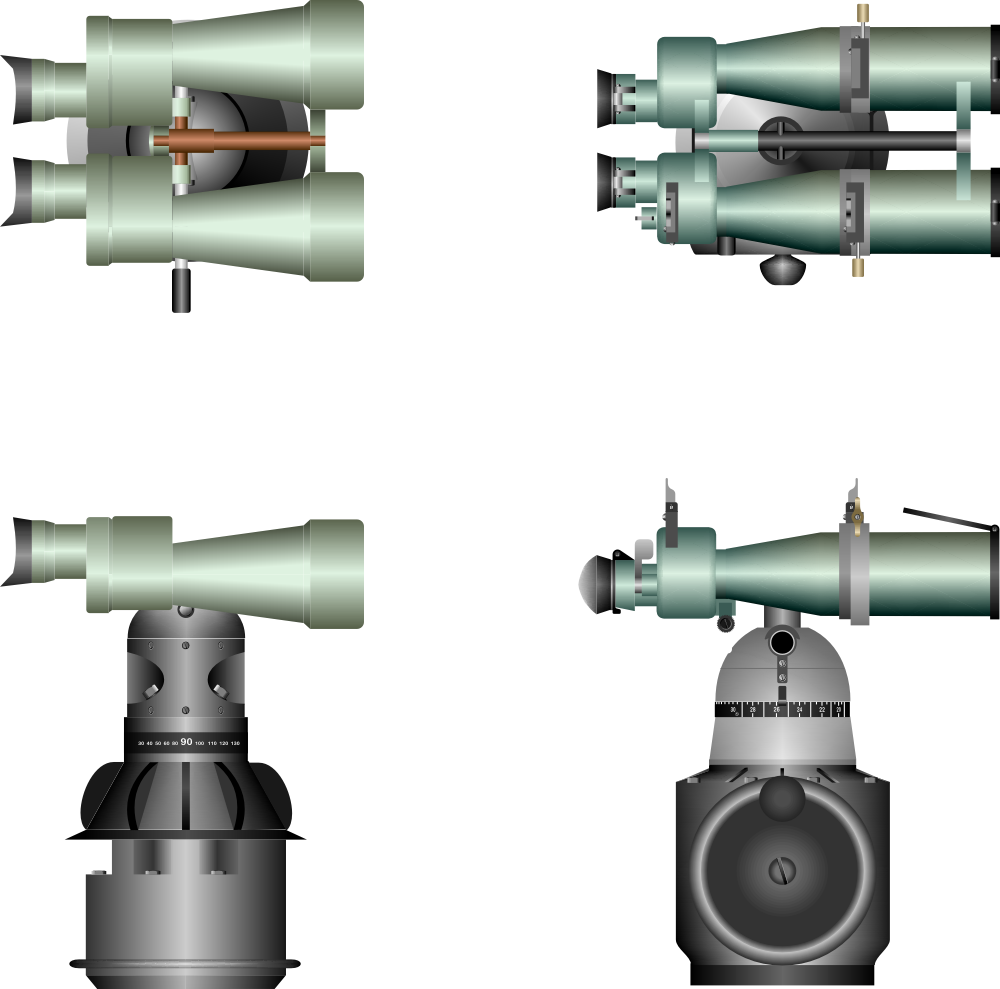
The older (left) and newer styles of UZO seen side by side.

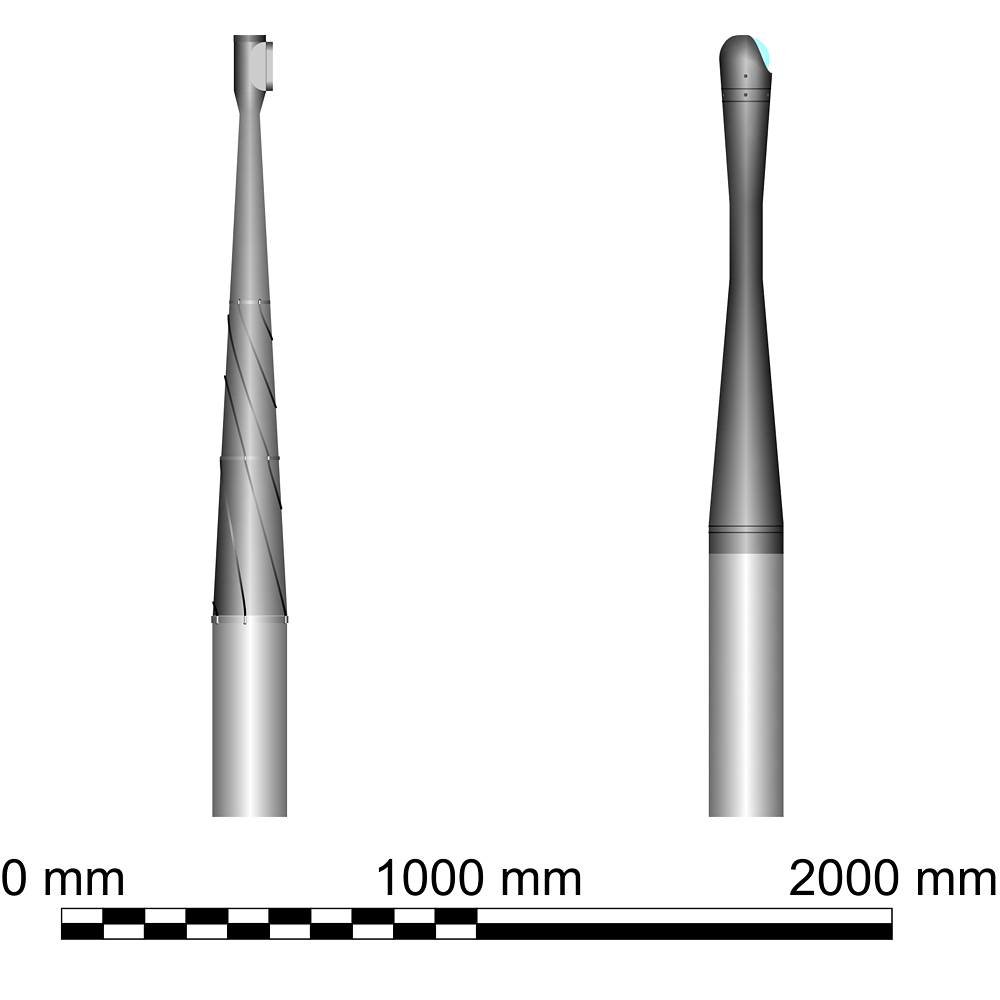
The head and neck of the attack (left) and observation periscopes seen side by side.

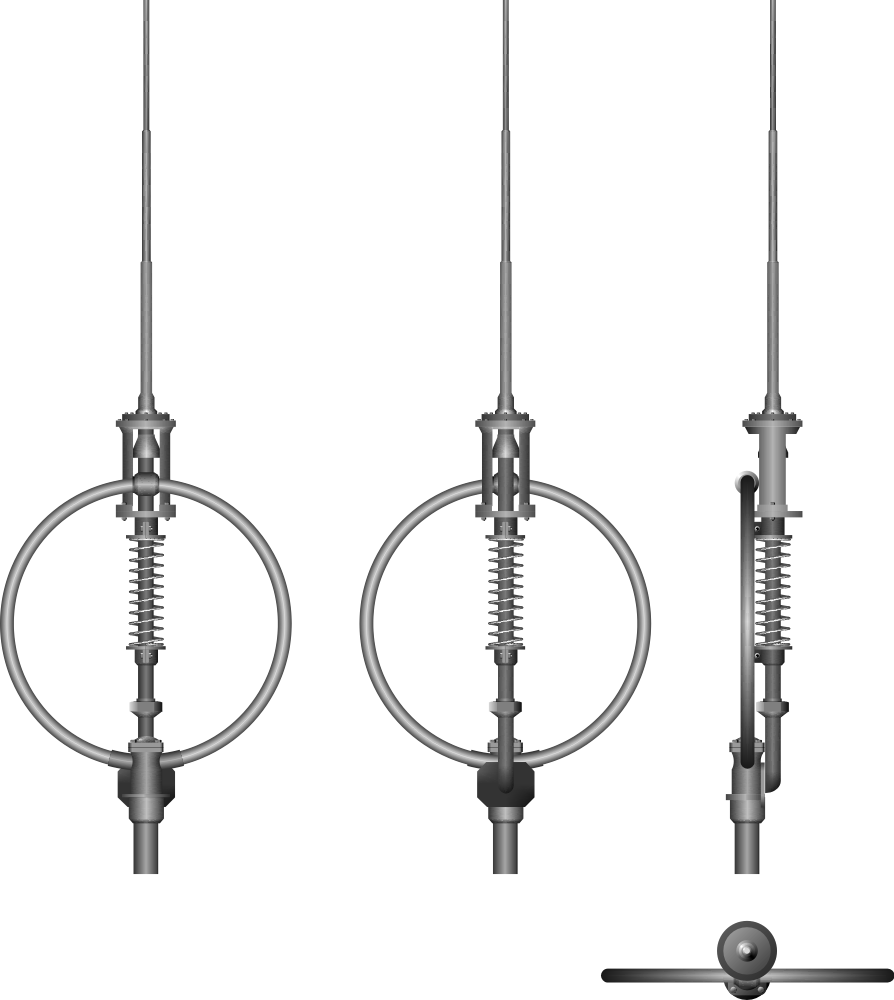
Direction Finder Antenna Loop (Late war design) - Used to detect a bearing from the radio signals of Allied surface ships.

== Radar ==
=== Thetis ===
Thetis was the name of a floating decoy used by U-boats to confuse Allied warship radars. The device was stored, dismantled, in the bow compartment, as a pole about 2 metres (6 ft 7 in) long. Assembly usually took place in the conning tower, she could be put together in about four minutes. Later versions could be launched from the standard torpedo tube. When deployed it was extended to a total length of 4 metres (13 ft 1 in), half of which was submerged. The upper half had a series of radar reflectors that were tuned to Allied anti-submarine radar wavelengths to give the same return signal as a U-boat. U-1308 typically carried between 15 and 20 of these decoys.

== Propulsion ==
=== Electric Motor ===
U-1308 was powered by two AEG Type GU 460/8-276 double-acting electric motors. Each motor weighed 8,130 kilograms (17,920 lb), without its fan 7,900 kilograms (17,400 lb). Each rotor weighed 3,200 kilograms (7,100 lb). The Type GU 460/8-276 electric motor could create 1,540 A (560 kW) at between 7.5 Hz (450 RPM) and 10.3 Hz (620 RPM).

== Schnorchel ==
U-1308 was the last Type VIIC/41 to be built and would have been fitted with a schnorchel, an apparatus to enhance the U-boats' performance below the surface, thus making its position more difficult to detect. Later model Type VIIC/41 boats were built with the device from the start. She would have been constructed with the final version of the schnorchel.

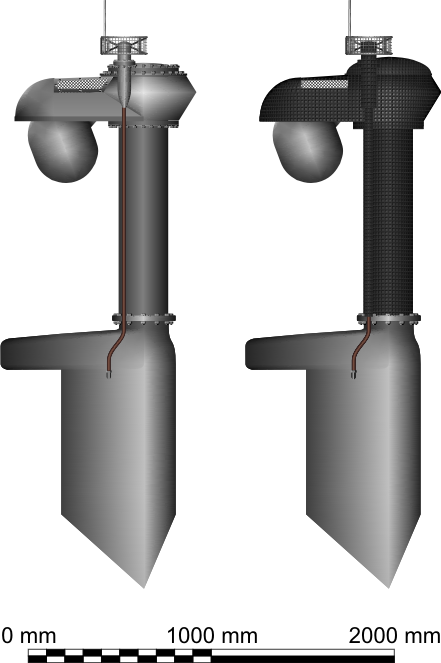
The final version of the schnorchel head for the Type VIIC. Starboard view, with and without the tarnmatte.

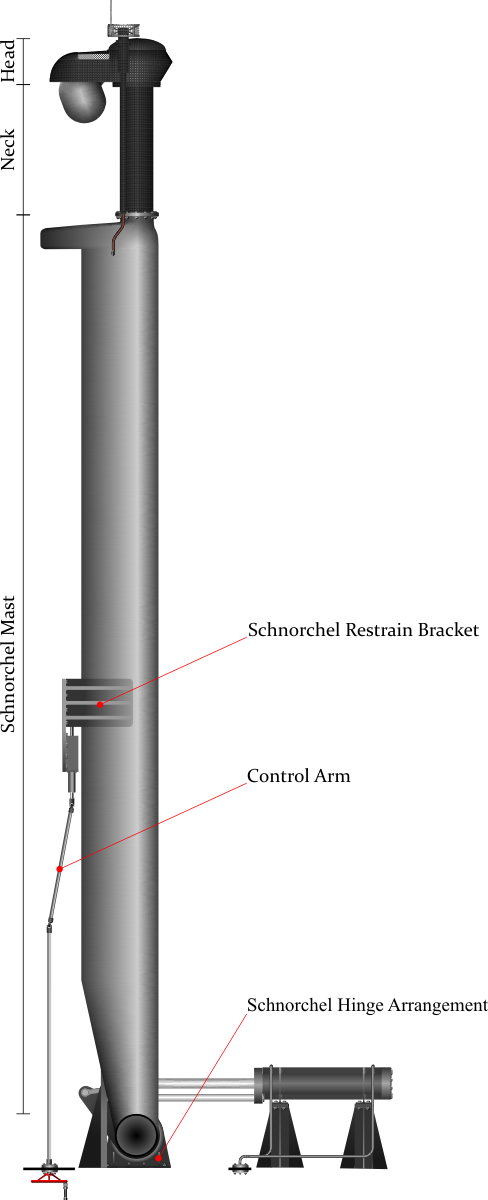
The schnorchel in its upright position illustrating its restraint bracket and hinge arrangement.

== Sensors ==
=== Passive sonar ===
U-1308 was one of only ten Type VIIC's to be fitted with a Balkongerät (literally 'Balcony apparatus or equipment'). The Balkongerät was used on U-boats (U-682, U-788, U-799, U-997, U-1021, U-1105, U-1172, U-1306, U-1307 and U-1307). The Balkongerät was standard on the Type XXI and the Type XXIII. Nonetheless, it was also fitted to several Type IXs and one Type X. The Balkongerät was an improved version of Gruppenhorchgerät (GHG) (group listening device). The GHG had 24 hydrophones, the Balkongerät had 48 hydrophones and improved electronics, which enabled more accurate readings to be taken.

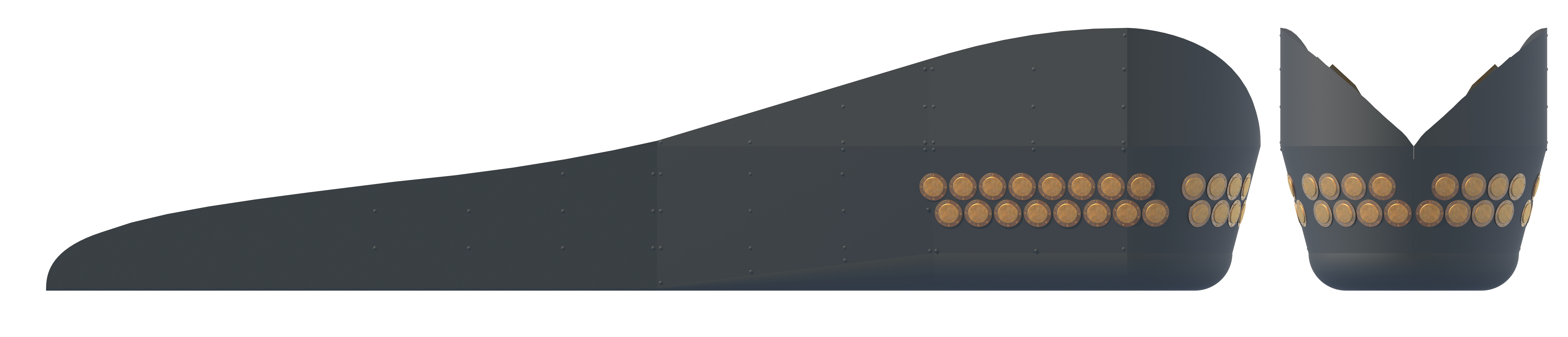
The outside view of the German design of Balcongerät installed on Type VIIC's

=== Anti-sonar coating ===
U-1308 was one of nine Type VIIs that the Kriegsmarine fitted with an experimental synthetic rubber skin of anechoic tiles, designed to counter the Allies' sonar devices. The code name Alberich was given to the coating. The OKM named it after the dwarf with the helmet of invisibility in Wagner's Ring Cycles. It was the first coating for any submarine.

== Armament ==
=== FLAK weaponry ===
U-1308 would have been mounted with a single 3.7 cm Flakzwilling M43U gun on the rare LM 43U mount. The LM 43U mount was the final design of mount used on U-boats and is only known to be installed on U-boats (U-249, U-826, U-977, U-1023, U-1171, U-1305 and U-1306). The 3.7 cm Flak M42U was the marine version of the 3.7 cm Flak used by the Kriegsmarine on Type VII and Type IX U-boats.

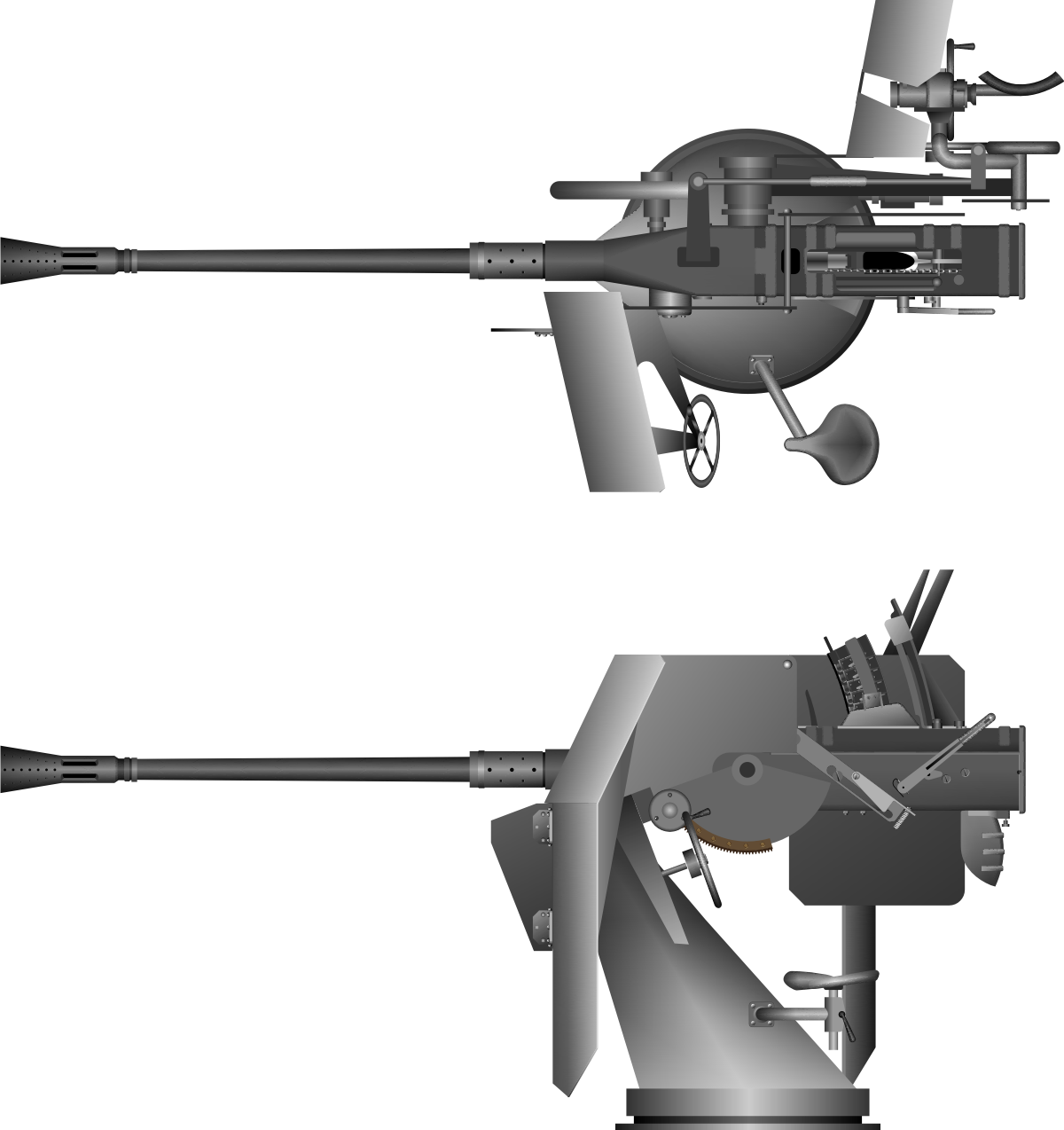
The single 3.7 cm Flak M42U gun on the LM 43U mount.

=== Torpedoes ===
- Five 53.3 cm (21 in) torpedo tubes (four bow, one stern).
- 14 torpedoes.

== See also ==
- Battle of the Atlantic (1939-1945)

== Bibliography ==
- Busch, Rainer; Röll, Hans-Joachim (1999). German U-boat commanders of World War II : a biographical dictionary. Translated by Brooks, Geoffrey. London, Annapolis, Md: Greenhill Books, Naval Institute Press. ISBN 1-55750-186-6.
- Busch, Rainer; Röll, Hans-Joachim (1999). Deutsche U-Boot-Verluste von September 1939 bis Mai 1945 [German U-boat losses from September 1939 to May 1945]. Der U-Boot-Krieg (in German). Vol. IV. Hamburg, Berlin, Bonn: Mittler. ISBN 3-8132-0514-2..
- Gröner, Erich (1985). Die deutschen Kriegsschiffe 1815-1945 / 3, U-Boote, Hilfskreuzer, Minenschiffe, Netzleger, Sperrbrecher (in German). Koblenz: Bernard & Graefe. ISBN 3-7637-4802-4. OCLC 310610321.
- Gröner, Erich; Jung, Dieter; Maass, Martin (1991). German Warships 1815–1945, U-boats and Mine Warfare Vessels. Vol. 2. Translated by Thomas, Keith; Magowan, Rachel. London: Conway Maritime Press. ISBN 0-85177-593-4.
