= German submarine U-1307 =

German World War II submarine

- U-995 Type VIIC/41 at the Laboe Naval Memorial. This U-boat is almost identical to U-1307.

History

Nazi Germany
- Name: U-1307
- Ordered: 1 August 1942
- Builder: Flensburger Schiffbau-Gesellschaft, Flensburg
- Yard number: 500
- Laid down: 2 December 1943
- Launched: 29 September 1944
- Commissioned: 17 November 1944
- Fate: Surrendered on 9 May 1945; Sunk on 9 December 1945 during Operation Deadlight

General characteristics
- Type: Type VIIC/41 submarine
- Displacement: 757 long tons (769 t) surfaced; 857 long tons (871 t) submerged
- Length: 67.10 m (220 ft 2 in) o/a; 50.50 m (165 ft 8 in) pressure hull
- Beam: 6.20 m (20 ft 4 in) o/a; 4.70 m (15 ft 5 in) pressure hull
- Height: 9.60 m (31 ft 6 in)
- Draught: 4.74 m (15 ft 7 in)
- Installed power: 2 × diesel engines; 2,800–3,200 PS (2,100–2,400 kW; 2,800–3,200 bhp) (diesels); 750 PS (550 kW; 740 shp) (electric)
- Propulsion: 2 × electric motors; 2 × screws
- Speed: 17.7 knots (32.8 km/h; 20.4 mph) surfaced; 7.6 knots (14.1 km/h; 8.7 mph) submerged
- Range: 8,500 nmi (15,700 km; 9,800 mi) at 10 knots (19 km/h; 12 mph) surfaced; 80 nmi (150 km; 92 mi) at 4 knots (7.4 km/h; 4.6 mph) submerged
- Test depth: 250 m (820 ft); Calculated crush depth: 250–295 m (820–968 ft)
- Complement: 44-52 officers & ratings
- Armament: 5 × 53.3 cm (21 in) torpedo tubes (4 bow, 1 stern); 14 × torpedoes; 1 × 8.8 cm (3.46 in) deck gun (220 rounds); 1 × 3.7 cm (1.5 in) Flak M42 AA gun; 2 × 2 cm (0.79 in) C/30 AA guns

Service record
- Part of: 4th U-boat Flotilla; 17 November 1944 – 8 May 1945
- Identification codes: M 47 679
- Commanders: Oblt.z.S. Hans Buscher; 17 November 1944 – 9 May 1945
- Operations: None
- Victories: None

German submarine U-1307 was a Type VIIC/41 U-boat of Nazi Germany's Kriegsmarine during World War II.

She was ordered on 1 August 1942, and was laid down on 2 December 1943, at Flensburger Schiffbau-Gesellschaft, Flensburg, as yard number 500. She was launched on 29 September 1944, and commissioned under the command of Oberleutnant zur See Hans Buscher on 17 November 1944.

== Design ==
German Type VIIC/41 submarines were preceded by the heavier Type VIIC submarines. U-1307 had a displacement of 769 tonnes (757 long tons) when at the surface and 871 tonnes (857 long tons) while submerged. She had a total length of 67.10 m (220 ft 2 in), a pressure hull length of 50.50 m (165 ft 8 in), an overall beam of 6.20 m (20 ft 4 in), a height of 9.60 m (31 ft 6 in), and a draught of 4.74 m (15 ft 7 in). The submarine was powered by two Germaniawerft F46 four-stroke, six-cylinder supercharged diesel engines producing a total of 2,800 to 3,200 metric horsepower (2,060 to 2,350 kW; 2,760 to 3,160 shp) for use while surfaced, two AEG GU 460/8-276 double-acting electric motors producing a total of 750 metric horsepower (550 kW; 740 shp) for use while submerged. She had two shafts and two 1.23 m (4 ft) propellers. The boat was capable of operating at depths of up to 230 metres (750 ft).

The submarine had a maximum surface speed of 17.7 knots (32.8 km/h; 20.4 mph) and a maximum submerged speed of 7.6 knots (14.1 km/h; 8.7 mph). When submerged, the boat could operate for 80 nautical miles (150 km; 92 mi) at 4 knots (7.4 km/h; 4.6 mph); when surfaced, she could travel 8,500 nautical miles (15,700 km; 9,800 mi) at 10 knots (19 km/h; 12 mph). U-1307 was fitted with five 53.3 cm (21 in) torpedo tubes (four fitted at the bow and one at the stern), fourteen torpedoes, one 8.8 cm (3.46 in) SK C/35 naval gun, (220 rounds), one 3.7 cm (1.5 in) Flak M42 and two 2 cm (0.79 in) C/30 anti-aircraft guns. The boat had a complement of between forty-four and fifty-two.

== Sensors ==
=== Passive sonar ===
U-1307 was one of only ten Type VIICs to be fitted with a Balkongerät (literally 'Balcony apparatus or equipment'). The Balkongerät was used on U-boats U-682, U-788, U-799, U-977, U-997, U-1021, U-1105, U-1172, and U-1308. The Balkongerät was standard on the Type XXI and the Type XXIII. Nonetheless, it was also fitted to several Type IXs and one Type X. The Balkongerät was an improved version of Gruppenhorchgerät (GHG) (group listening device). The GHG had 24 hydrophones, the Balkongerät had 48 hydrophones and improved electronics, which enabled more accurate readings to be taken.

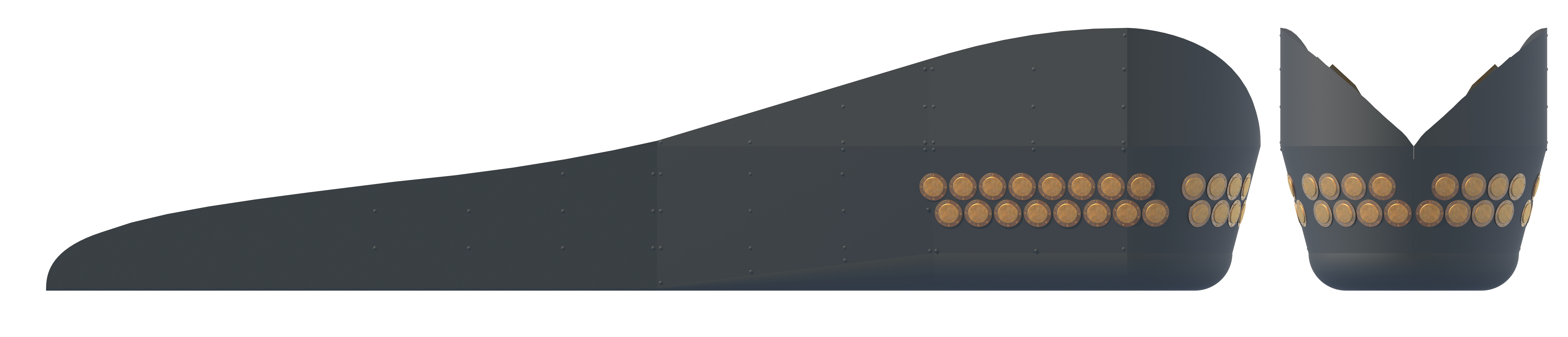
The outside view of the German design of Balcongerät installed on Type VIICs

== Service history ==
On 9 May 1945, U-1307 surrendered at Bergen, Norway. She was later transferred to Loch Ryan, Scotland on 2 June 1945. Of the 156 U-boats that eventually surrendered to the Allied forces at the end of the war, U-1307 was one of 116 selected to take part in Operation Deadlight. U-1307 was towed out and sank on 9 December 1945, by rockets from a British Firefly aircraft launched from the escort carrier HMS Nairana.

The wreck now lies at 55°50′N 10°05′W.

== See also ==
- Battle of the Atlantic

== Bibliography ==
- Busch, Rainer; Röll, Hans-Joachim (1999). German U-boat commanders of World War II : a biographical dictionary. Translated by Brooks, Geoffrey. London, Annapolis, Md: Greenhill Books, Naval Institute Press. ISBN 1-55750-186-6.
- Busch, Rainer; Röll, Hans-Joachim (1999). Deutsche U-Boot-Verluste von September 1939 bis Mai 1945 [German U-boat losses from September 1939 to May 1945]. Der U-Boot-Krieg (in German). Vol. IV. Hamburg, Berlin, Bonn: Mittler. ISBN 3-8132-0514-2.
- Gröner, Erich; Jung, Dieter; Maass, Martin (1991). U-boats and Mine Warfare Vessels. German Warships 1815–1945. Vol. 2. Translated by Thomas, Keith; Magowan, Rachel. London: Conway Maritime Press. ISBN 0-85177-593-4.
