= German submarine U-965 =

German World War II submarine

- U-570 Type VIIC submarine that was captured by the British in 1941. This U-boat is almost identical to U-965.

History

Nazi Germany
- Name: U-965
- Ordered: 5 June 1941
- Builder: Blohm & Voss, Hamburg
- Yard number: 165
- Laid down: 4 May 1942
- Launched: 14 January 1943
- Commissioned: 25 February 1943
- Fate: Sunk on 30 March 1945

General characteristics
- Class & type: Type VIIC submarine
- Displacement: 769 tonnes (757 long tons) surfaced; 871 t (857 long tons) submerged
- Length: 67.10 m (220 ft 2 in) o/a; 50.50 m (165 ft 8 in) pressure hull
- Beam: 6.20 m (20 ft 4 in) o/a; 4.70 m (15 ft 5 in) pressure hull
- Height: 9.60 m (31 ft 6 in)
- Draught: 4.74 m (15 ft 7 in)
- Installed power: 2,800–3,200 PS (2,100–2,400 kW; 2,800–3,200 bhp) (diesels); 750 PS (550 kW; 740 shp) (electric)
- Propulsion: 2 shafts; 2 × diesel engines; 2 × electric motors
- Speed: 17.7 knots (32.8 km/h; 20.4 mph) surfaced; 7.6 knots (14.1 km/h; 8.7 mph) submerged
- Range: 8,500 nmi (15,700 km; 9,800 mi) at 10 knots (19 km/h; 12 mph) surfaced; 80 nmi (150 km; 92 mi) at 4 knots (7.4 km/h; 4.6 mph) submerged
- Test depth: 220 m (720 ft); Crush depth: 250–295 m (820–968 ft)
- Complement: 4 officers, 44–52 enlisted
- Armament: 5 × 53.3 cm (21 in) torpedo tubes (four bow, one stern); 14 × torpedoes or; 26 TMA mines; 1 × 8.8 cm (3.46 in) deck gun (220 rounds); 1 × twin 2 cm (0.79 in) C/30 anti-aircraft gun

Service record
- Part of: 5th U-boat Flotilla; 25 February – 31 December 1943; 11th U-boat Flotilla; 1 January – 30 September 1944; 13th U-boat Flotilla; 1 October 1944 – 30 March 1945
- Identification codes: M 51 414
- Commanders: Oblt.z.S. / Kptlt. Klaus Ohling; 25 February 1943 – 6 June 1944; Oblt.z.S. Günter Unverzagt; 7 June 1944 – 30 March 1945
- Operations: 7 patrols: 1st patrol: a. 1 January – 3 February 1944; b. 5 – 9 February 1944; c. 14 – 18 May 1944; 2nd patrol: a. 23 June – 23 July 1944; b. 19 – 22 August 1944; c. 1 – 3 September 1944; d. 8 – 9 September 1944; e. 16 – 19 September 1944; f. 21 – 23 September 1944; 3rd patrol: a. 26 September – 3 October 1944; b. 15 – 23 October 1944; 4th patrol: a. 24 October – 11 November 1944; b. 13 – 14 November 1944; 5th patrol: a. 21 November – 14 December 1944; b. 17 – 20 December 1944; 6th patrol: 15 – 27 February 1945; 7th patrol: 5 – 30 March 1945
- Victories: None

German submarine U-965 was a Type VIIC U-boat of Nazi Germany's Kriegsmarine during World War II.

She was ordered on 5 June 1941, and was laid down on 4 May 1942 at Blohm & Voss, Hamburg, as yard number 165. She was launched on 14 January 1943 and commissioned under the command of Oberleutnant zur See Klaus Ohling on 25 February 1943.

== Design ==
German Type VIIC submarines were preceded by the shorter Type VIIB submarines. U-965 had a displacement of 769 tonnes (757 long tons) when at the surface and 871 tonnes (857 long tons) while submerged. She had a total length of 67.10 m (220 ft 2 in), a pressure hull length of 50.50 m (165 ft 8 in), a beam of 6.20 m (20 ft 4 in), a height of 9.60 m (31 ft 6 in), and a draught of 4.74 m (15 ft 7 in). The submarine was powered by two Germaniawerft F46 four-stroke, six-cylinder supercharged diesel engines producing a total of 2,800 to 3,200 metric horsepower (2,060 to 2,350 kW; 2,760 to 3,160 shp) for use while surfaced, two Garbe, Lahmeyer & Co. RP 137/c double-acting electric motors producing a total of 750 metric horsepower (550 kW; 740 shp) for use while submerged. She had two shafts and two 1.23 m (4 ft) propellers. The boat was capable of operating at depths of up to 230 metres (750 ft).

The submarine had a maximum surface speed of 17.7 knots (32.8 km/h; 20.4 mph) and a maximum submerged speed of 7.6 knots (14.1 km/h; 8.7 mph). When submerged, the boat could operate for 80 nautical miles (150 km; 92 mi) at 4 knots (7.4 km/h; 4.6 mph); when surfaced, she could travel 8,500 nautical miles (15,700 km; 9,800 mi) at 10 knots (19 km/h; 12 mph). U-965 was fitted with five 53.3 cm (21 in) torpedo tubes (four fitted at the bow and one at the stern), fourteen torpedoes or 26 TMA mines, one 8.8 cm (3.46 in) SK C/35 naval gun, 220 rounds, and one twin 2 cm (0.79 in) C/30 anti-aircraft gun. The boat had a complement of between 44 — 52 men.

== Service history ==
U-965 had a recorded three attacks on her and one lost crewmember, but she actually came under four attacks, the fourth sinking her.

On 6 February 1944, one day after leaving Narvik, Leutnant zur See Gustav-Günther Schoop, the I.WO (1st Watch Officer), fell overboard and drowned.

On 17 May 1944, four days out of Bergen, U-965 developed serious technical problems and was forced to return to base. U-965 encountered an enemy submarine four hours after turning back for base. The enemy submarine fired a spread of torpedoes, which all missed.

U-965 was on her second war patrol when, at 13:05 hrs on 20 July 1944, she came under attack in the Norwegian Sea by a British B-24 Liberator of 59 Squadron/N RAF piloted by F/O D.A. Willows, after locating her on radar. The B-24 passed U-965 two miles astern trying to come in on a favorable approach on her starboard beam. As the Liberator approached U-965's 37mm AA gun jammed on the first round and the bomber was able to hit both men, with machine gun fire, manning the twin 20mm AA gun on the port side. However, the lock-select lever on the B-24 had not been fully engaged which caused the depth charges to not release over U-965's stern as intended. U-965 was then able to dive and escape the seven depth charges that the Liberator dropped about 40 seconds after she dived. Returning 90 minutes later, the Liberator crew reported seeing two small oil streaks, an oval life raft and a couple of pieces of wood. U-965 was undamaged and remained submerged and unseen until the bomber left.

On 22 August 1944, U-965 came under attack by two Fleet Air Arm Grumman F6F Hellcat, in Hammerfest. Eight crewmen were wounded with three crewmen killed.

U-965 was sunk on 30 March 1945, by depth charges, in the North Minch in the North Atlantic, by the British frigates HMS Rupert and HMS Conn. All 51 of her crew were lost.

The wreck is located at. 58.19N, 05.31W

=== Wolfpacks ===
U-965 took part in nine wolfpacks, namely:

- Isegim (5 – 27 January 1944)
- Werewolf (27 January – 2 February 1944)
- Trutz (23 June – 10 July 1944)
- Schwefel (22 – 23 September 1944)
- Zorn (28 September – 1 October 1944)
- Grimm (1 – 2 October 1944)
- Panther (16 – 22 October 1944)
- Panther (24 October – 10 November 1944)
- Stier (25 November – 19 December 1944)

39°36′N 09°05′W

== Bibliography ==
- Busch, Rainer; Röll, Hans-Joachim (1999). German U-boat commanders of World War II : a biographical dictionary. Translated by Brooks, Geoffrey. London, Annapolis, Md: Greenhill Books, Naval Institute Press. ISBN 1-55750-186-6.
- Busch, Rainer; Röll, Hans-Joachim (1999). Der U-Boot-Krieg, 1939-1945: Deutsche U-Boot-Verluste von September 1939 bis Mai 1945 [German U-boat losses from September 1939 to May 1945] (in German). Vol. IV. Hamburg, Berlin, Bonn: Mittler. ISBN 3-8132-0514-2.
- Gröner, Erich; Jung, Dieter; Maass, Martin (1991). U-boats and Mine Warfare Vessels. German Warships 1815–1945. Vol. 2. Translated by Thomas, Keith; Magowan, Rachel. London: Conway Maritime Press. ISBN 0-85177-593-4.
