= German submarine U-1172 =

German World War II submarine

- U-995 Type VIIC/41 at the Laboe Naval Memorial. This U-boat is almost identical to U-1172.

History

Nazi Germany
- Name: U-1172
- Ordered: 16 July 1942
- Builder: Danziger Werft AG, Danzig
- Yard number: 144
- Laid down: 7 June 1943
- Launched: 3 December 1943
- Commissioned: 20 April 1944
- Fate: Sunk on 27 January 1945

General characteristics
- Class & type: Type VIIC/41 submarine
- Displacement: 759 tonnes (747 long tons) surfaced; 860 t (846 long tons) submerged
- Length: 67.23 m (220 ft 7 in) o/a; 50.50 m (165 ft 8 in) pressure hull
- Beam: 6.20 m (20 ft 4 in) o/a; 4.70 m (15 ft 5 in) pressure hull
- Height: 9.60 m (31 ft 6 in)
- Draught: 4.74 m (15 ft 7 in)
- Installed power: 2,800–3,200 PS (2,100–2,400 kW; 2,800–3,200 bhp) (diesels); 750 PS (550 kW; 740 shp) (electric)
- Propulsion: 2 shafts; 2 × diesel engines; 2 × electric motors
- Speed: 17.7 knots (32.8 km/h; 20.4 mph) surfaced; 7.6 knots (14.1 km/h; 8.7 mph) submerged
- Range: 8,500 nmi (15,700 km; 9,800 mi) at 10 knots (19 km/h; 12 mph) surfaced; 80 nmi (150 km; 92 mi) at 4 knots (7.4 km/h; 4.6 mph) submerged
- Test depth: 230 m (750 ft); Calculated crush depth: 250–295 m (820–968 ft)
- Complement: 44-52 officers & ratings
- Armament: 5 × 53.3 cm (21 in) torpedo tubes (4 bow, 1 stern); 14 × torpedoes; 1 × 8.8 cm (3.46 in) deck gun (220 rounds); 1 × 3.7 cm (1.5 in) Flak M42 AA gun; 2 × 2 cm (0.79 in) C/30 AA guns

Service record
- Part of: 8th U-boat Flotilla; 20 April – 30 November 1944; 11th U-boat Flotilla; 1 December 1944 – 27 January 1945
- Identification codes: M 05 593
- Commanders: Oblt.z.S. Jürgen Kuhlmann; 20 April 1944 – 27 January 1945
- Operations: 1 patrol: 22 December 1944 – 27 January 1945
- Victories: 1 merchant ship sunk (1,599 GRT); 1 warship total loss (11,400 tons); 1 merchant ship damaged (7,429 GRT)

German submarine U-1172 was a Type VIIC/41 U-boat built for Nazi Germany's Kriegsmarine for service during World War II. She was laid down on 7 June 1943 by Danziger Werft, Danzig as yard number 144, launched on 3 December 1943 and commissioned on 20 April 1944 under Oberleutnant zur See Jürgen Kuhlmann.

== Design ==
Like all Type VIIC/41 U-boats, U-1172 had a displacement of 759 tonnes (747 long tons) when at the surface and 860 tonnes (850 long tons) while submerged. She had a total length of 67.23 m (220 ft 7 in), a pressure hull length of 50.50 m (165 ft 8 in), a beam of 6.20 m (20 ft 4 in), and a draught of 4.74 m (15 ft 7 in). The submarine was powered by two Germaniawerft F46 supercharged six-cylinder four-stroke diesel engines producing a total of 2,800 to 3,200 metric horsepower (2,060 to 2,350 kW; 2,760 to 3,160 shp) and two SSW GU 343/38-8 double-acting electric motors producing a total of 750 metric horsepower (550 kW; 740 shp) for use while submerged. The boat was capable of operating at a depth of 250 metres (820 ft).

The submarine had a maximum surface speed of 17.7 knots (32.8 km/h; 20.4 mph) and a submerged speed of 7.6 knots (14.1 km/h; 8.7 mph). When submerged, the boat could operate for 80 nautical miles (150 km; 92 mi) at 4 knots (7.4 km/h; 4.6 mph); when surfaced, she could travel 8,500 nautical miles (15,700 km; 9,800 mi) at 10 knots (19 km/h; 12 mph). U-1172 was fitted with five 53.3 cm (21 in) torpedo tubes (four fitted at the bow and one at the stern), fourteen torpedoes, one 8.8 cm (3.46 in) SK C/35 naval gun, (220 rounds), one 3.7 cm (1.5 in) Flak M42 and two 2 cm (0.79 in) C/30 anti-aircraft guns. Its complement was between forty-four and sixty.

== Sensors ==
=== Passive sonar ===
U-1172 was one of only ten Type VIIC's to be fitted with a Balkongerät (literally 'Balcony apparatus or equipment'). The Balkongerät was used on U-boats (U-682, U-788, U-799, U-977, U-1021, U-1105, U-1306, U-1307 and U-1308). The Balkongerät was standard on the Type XXI and the Type XXIII. Nonetheless, it was also fitted to several Type IXs and one Type X. The Balkongerät was an improved version of Gruppenhorchgerät (GHG) (group listening device). The GHG had 24 hydrophones, the Balkongerät had 48 hydrophones and improved electronics, which enabled more accurate readings to be taken.

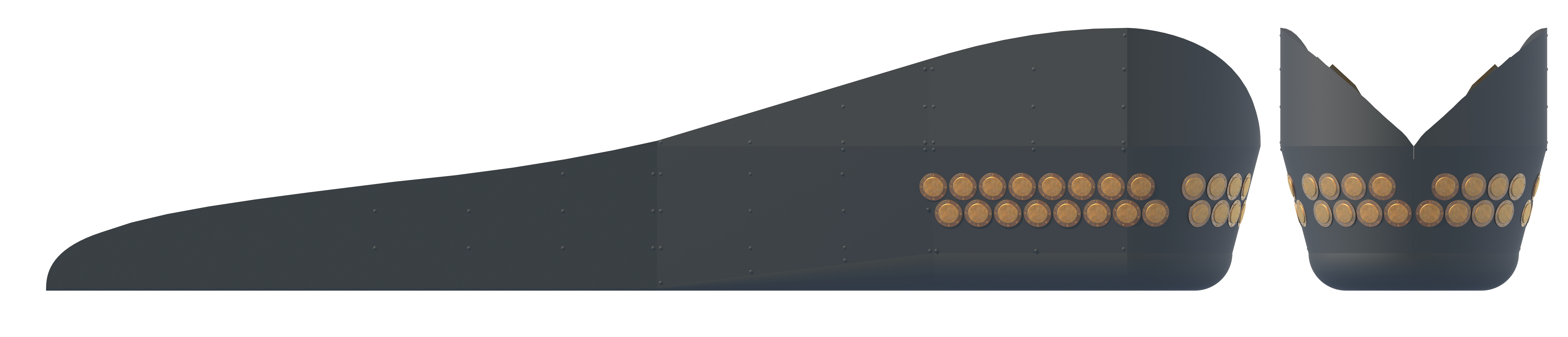
The outside view of the German design of Balcongerät installed on Type VIIC's

== Service history ==
The boat's service career began on 20 April 1944 with the 8th Training Flotilla, followed by active service with 11th Flotilla on 1 December 1944. U-1172 took part in no wolfpacks. U-1172 was sunk on 27 January 1945 in St Georges Channel by depth charges from British frigates HMS Tyler, HMS Keats and HMS Bligh at 52°24′N 05°42′W.

== Summary of raiding history ==
Date	Ship Name	Nationality	Tonnage (Note: Merchant ship tonnages are in gross register tons. Military vessels are listed by tons displacement.)	Fate
15 January 1945	HMS Thane	Royal Navy	11,400	Total loss
15 January 1945	Spinanger	Norway	7,429	Damaged
23 January 1945	Vigsnes	Norway	1,599	Sunk

== See also ==
- Battle of the Atlantic

== Bibliography ==
- Busch, Rainer; Röll, Hans-Joachim (1999). German U-boat commanders of World War II : a biographical dictionary. Translated by Brooks, Geoffrey. London, Annapolis, Md: Greenhill Books, Naval Institute Press. ISBN 1-55750-186-6.
- Gröner, Erich; Jung, Dieter; Maass, Martin (1991). German Warships 1815–1945, U-boats and Mine Warfare Vessels. Vol. 2. Translated by Thomas, Keith; Magowan, Rachel. London: Conway Maritime Press. ISBN 0-85177-593-4.
