= Thetis (decoy) =

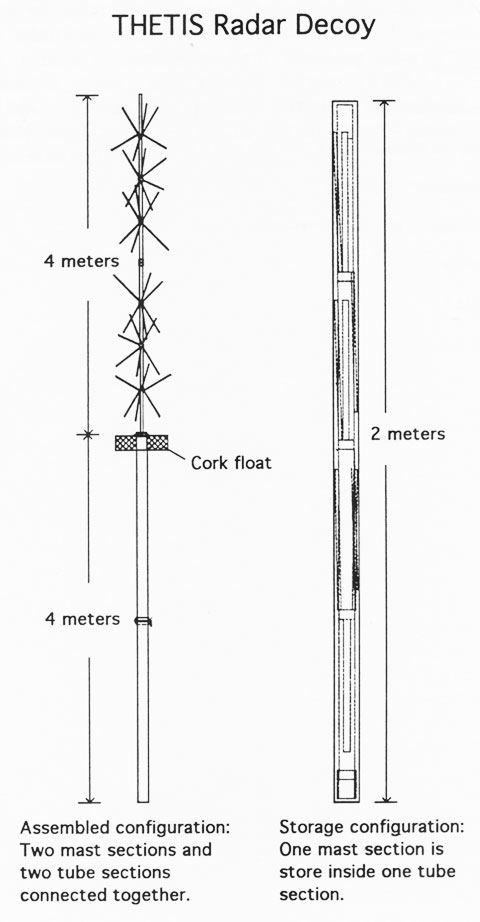
A US government drawing of a Thetis decoy.

Thetis was the name of a floating radar decoy used by German U-boats during the Second World War.

The device was stored dismantled in the bow compartment as a pole about two metres long. Assembly usually took place in the U-boat's conning tower, and could be assembled in about four minutes (FuMT 2 - Thetis IIC). Later versions could be launched from a standard torpedo tube (FuMT 4 - Thetis US). When deployed, it was extended to a total length of eight metres, half of which was submerged. The upper half had a series of reflectors that were tuned to Allied anti-submarine radar wavelengths to give the same return signal as a U-boat. The number of Thetis decoys carried varied between different U-boats:

- U-66 carried approximately 12 units during her 10th and last patrol between 16 January 1944 and 6 May; all were used in the Bay of Biscay.
- U-91 carried 16 units during her 6th and last patrol between 25 January 1944 and 25 February.
- U-371 carried an unknown number of units during her 21st and last patrol between 23 April 1944 and 4 May.
- U-575 carried 15 units during her 13th and last patrol between 29 February 1944 and 13 March. U-575 would surface every night and laid a total of 10 on her outward voyage, the remaining units were to have been laid in the same area on her return.
- U-744 carried 20 units during her 2nd and last patrol between 24 February 1944 and 6 March. U-744 used them on her outward voyage between 11°W and 12°W in the Bay of Biscay.

The first time the Allies knew about the "Thetis" was in a coded radio message to all U-boats transmitted on 11 January 1944. "Thetis" was introduced in January, when large numbers were released into the Bay of Biscay in July to simulate U-boat patrols during the Battle of Normandy.

== See also ==
- Bold (decoy)
