= HMS Rupert (K561) =

Frigate of the Royal Navy

History

United States
- Name: unnamed (DE-96)
- Ordered: 10 January 1942
- Builder: Bethlehem-Hingham Shipyard, Hingham, Massachusetts
- Laid down: 25 August 1943
- Launched: 31 October 1943
- Completed: 24 December 1943
- Fate: Transferred to United Kingdom 24 December 1943
- Acquired: Returned by United Kingdom 20 March 1946
- Stricken: 17 April 1946
- Fate: Sold for scrapping 17 June 1946

United Kingdom
- Name: HMS Rupert (K561)
- Namesake: Prince Rupert of the Rhine (1619-1682), Royalist cavalry commander during the English Civil War and Admiral of the Fleet during the Second and Third Anglo-Dutch Wars
- Acquired: 24 December 1943
- Commissioned: 24 December 1943
- Fate: Returned to United States 20 March 1946

General characteristics
- Displacement: 1,400 long tons (1,422 t)
- Length: 306 ft (93 m)
- Beam: 36.75 ft (11.2 m)
- Draught: 9 ft (2.7 m)
- Propulsion: Two Foster-Wheeler Express "D"-type water-tube boilers; GE 13,500 shp (10,070 kW) steam turbines and generators (9,200 kW); Electric motors for 12,000 shp (8,900 kW); Two shafts
- Speed: 24 knots (44 km/h)
- Range: 5,500 nautical miles (10,200 km) at 15 knots (28 km/h)
- Complement: 186
- Sensors & processing systems: SA & SL type radars; Type 144 series Asdic; MF Direction Finding antenna; HF Direction Finding Type FH 4 antenna
- Armament: 3 × 3 in (76 mm) /50 Mk.22 guns; 1 × twin Bofors 40 mm mount Mk.I; 7–16 × 20 mm Oerlikon guns; Mark 10 Hedgehog antisubmarine mortar; Depth charges; QF 2-pounder naval gun

The fourth HMS Rupert (K561) was a British Captain-class frigate of the Royal Navy in commission during World War II. Originally constructed as a United States Navy Buckley class destroyer escort, she served in the Royal Navy from 1943 to 1946.

== Construction and transfer ==
The ship was laid down as the unnamed U.S. Navy destroyer escort DE-96 by Bethlehem-Hingham Shipyard, Inc., in Hingham, Massachusetts, on 25 August 1943 and launched on 31 October 1943. She was transferred to the United Kingdom upon completion on 24 December 1943.

== Service history ==
Commissioned into service in the Royal Navy as the frigate HMS Rupert (K561) on 24 December 1943 simultaneously with her transfer, the ship served on patrol and escort duty. On 30 March 1945, she joined the British frigate HMS Conn (K509) in a depth charge attack which sank the German submarine U-965 north of Scotland in position 58°19′00″N 005°31′00″W.

On 27 April 1945, the German submarine U-1105 detected three British frigates in the North Atlantic Ocean 25 nautical miles (46 km) west of County Mayo, Ireland, and fired two G7es – known to the Allies as "GNAT" – torpedoes at them. Fifty seconds later, the first torpedo struck the frigate HMS Redmill (K554) at 54°23′00″N 010°36′00″W, followed a few seconds later by the second, together blowing 60 feet (over 18 meters) of her stern off. U-1105 evaded counterattack. Rupert stood by Redmill and rendered assistance, and Redmill managed to remain afloat and was towed to Lisahally, Northern Ireland.

The Royal Navy returned Rupert to the U.S. Navy on 20 March 1946.

== Disposal ==
The U.S. Navy struck Rupert from its Naval Vessel Register on 17 April 1946. She was sold on 17 June 1946 for scrapping.
