= German submarine U-325 =

German World War II submarine

History

Nazi Germany
- Name: U-325
- Ordered: 16 July 1942
- Builder: Flender Werke, Lübeck
- Yard number: 325
- Laid down: 13 April 1943
- Launched: 25 March 1944
- Commissioned: 6 May 1944
- Fate: Sunk on 30 April 1945

General characteristics
- Class & type: Type VIIC/41 submarine
- Displacement: 759 tonnes (747 long tons) surfaced; 860 t (846 long tons) submerged
- Length: 67.23 m (220 ft 7 in) o/a; 50.50 m (165 ft 8 in) pressure hull
- Beam: 6.20 m (20 ft 4 in) o/a; 4.70 m (15 ft 5 in) pressure hull
- Height: 9.60 m (31 ft 6 in)
- Draught: 4.74 m (15 ft 7 in)
- Installed power: 2,800–3,200 PS (2,100–2,400 kW; 2,800–3,200 bhp) (diesels); 750 PS (550 kW; 740 shp) (electric)
- Propulsion: 2 shafts; 2 × diesel engines; 2 × electric motors
- Speed: 17.7 knots (32.8 km/h; 20.4 mph) surfaced; 7.6 knots (14.1 km/h; 8.7 mph) submerged
- Range: 8,500 nmi (15,700 km; 9,800 mi) at 10 knots (19 km/h; 12 mph) surfaced; 80 nmi (150 km; 92 mi) at 4 knots (7.4 km/h; 4.6 mph) submerged
- Test depth: 250 m (820 ft); Crush depth: 275–325 m (902–1,066 ft)
- Complement: 4 officers, 40–56 enlisted
- Armament: 5 × 53.3 cm (21 in) torpedo tubes (four bow, one stern); 14 × torpedoes; 1 × 8.8 cm (3.46 in) deck gun (220 rounds); 1 × 3.7 cm (1.5 in) Flak M42 AA gun; 2 × 2 cm (0.79 in) C/30 AA guns

Service record
- Part of: 4th U-boat Flotilla; 6 May – 30 November 1944; 11th U-boat Flotilla; 1 December 1944 – 30 April 1945
- Identification codes: M 14 343
- Commanders: Oblt.z.S. Erwin Dohrn; 6 May 1944 – 30 April 1945
- Operations: 3 patrols: 1st patrol: 1 – 4 December 1944; 2nd patrol: 9 December 1944 – 14 February 1945; 3rd patrol: 20 March – 30 April 1945
- Victories: None

German submarine U-325 was a Type VIIC/41 U-boat of Nazi Germany's Kriegsmarine during World War II.

The submarine was laid down on 13 April 1943 at the Flender Werke at Lübeck, launched on 25 March 1944, and commissioned on 6 May 1944 under the command of Oberleutnant zur See Erwin Dohrn.

== Design ==
German Type VIIC/41 submarines were preceded by the heavier Type VIIC submarines. U-325 had a displacement of 759 tonnes (747 long tons) when at the surface and 860 tonnes (850 long tons) while submerged. She had a total length of 67.10 m (220 ft 2 in), a pressure hull length of 50.50 m (165 ft 8 in), a beam of 6.20 m (20 ft 4 in), a height of 9.60 m (31 ft 6 in), and a draught of 4.74 m (15 ft 7 in). The submarine was powered by two Germaniawerft F46 four-stroke, six-cylinder supercharged diesel engines producing a total of 2,800 to 3,200 metric horsepower (2,060 to 2,350 kW; 2,760 to 3,160 shp) for use while surfaced, two Garbe, Lahmeyer & Co. RP 137/c double-acting electric motors producing a total of 750 metric horsepower (550 kW; 740 shp) for use while submerged. She had two shafts and two 1.23 m (4 ft) propellers. The boat was capable of operating at depths of up to 230 metres (750 ft).

The submarine had a maximum surface speed of 17.7 knots (32.8 km/h; 20.4 mph) and a maximum submerged speed of 7.6 knots (14.1 km/h; 8.7 mph). When submerged, the boat could operate for 80 nautical miles (150 km; 92 mi) at 4 knots (7.4 km/h; 4.6 mph); when surfaced, she could travel 8,500 nautical miles (15,700 km; 9,800 mi) at 10 knots (19 km/h; 12 mph). U-325 was fitted with five 53.3 cm (21 in) torpedo tubes (four fitted at the bow and one at the stern), fourteen torpedoes, one 8.8 cm (3.46 in) SK C/35 naval gun, (220 rounds), one 3.7 cm (1.5 in) Flak M42 and two 2 cm (0.79 in) C/30 anti-aircraft guns. The boat had a complement of between forty-four and sixty.

== Service history ==
U-325's first patrol took her from Kiel in Germany to Horten Naval Base in Norway, between 1 and 4 December 1944. She then sailed from Horten on 9 December 1944, and around the British Isles into the western English Channel, before returning to Trondheim on 14 February 1945, although she recorded no successes.

=== Loss ===
U-325 sailed from Trondheim on 20 March 1945 for her third and final patrol and was ordered to return to the waters off Lands End. Even though her last report was received on 7 April, when Germany surrendered on 8 May 1945 U-325 was still considered operational by the U-boat High Command. However it soon became apparent that the submarine was lost.

The British initially attributed the loss of U-325 to a depth charge attack by the destroyers HMS Hesperus and Havelock on 30 April 1945. However, after later analysis of German records that submarine was re-identified as U-242, and U-325's fate was officially classified as "unknown".

== Discovery ==
The wreck of U-325 was finally discovered by Scuba divers in 2006, 17 kilometres (11 mi) South of Lizard Point at position 49°48′17″N 5°12′23″W. To counter the increasing number of schnorkel-fitted U-boats in UK coastal waters, the First Sea Lord ordered a heavy anti-U-boat mining programme to be undertaken in the Western Approaches, Plymouth and Portsmouth Commands on 15 January 1945. By April 1945, nine different fields (Serial B1, part 1 to 4, Serial B2, part 1 to 4, and Serial B3, part 1), comprising 900 Mk XVII/XVII(8) mines were laid off Lizard Head. U-325 struck a mine in field B3, part 1. This field was laid by the coastal minelayer HMS Plover escorted by the minesweepers HMS lfracombe and Shippigan.

== See also ==
- Battle of the Atlantic (1939-1945)

== Bibliography ==
- Busch, Rainer; Röll, Hans-Joachim (1999). German U-boat commanders of World War II : a biographical dictionary. Translated by Brooks, Geoffrey. London, Annapolis, Md: Greenhill Books, Naval Institute Press. ISBN 1-55750-186-6.
- Busch, Rainer; Röll, Hans-Joachim (1999). Der U-Boot-Krieg, 1939-1945: Deutsche U-Boot-Verluste von September 1939 bis Mai 1945 [German U-boat losses from September 1939 to May 1945] (in German). Vol. IV. Hamburg, Berlin, Bonn: Mittler. ISBN 3-8132-0514-2.
- Gröner, Erich; Jung, Dieter; Maass, Martin (1991). U-boats and Mine Warfare Vessels. German Warships 1815–1945. Vol. 2. Translated by Thomas, Keith; Magowan, Rachel. London: Conway Maritime Press. ISBN 0-85177-593-4.
- Kemp, Paul (1999). U-Boats Destroyed - German Submarine Losses in the World Wars. London: Arms & Armour. ISBN 1-85409-515-3.
