= HMS Conn =

Frigate of the Royal Navy

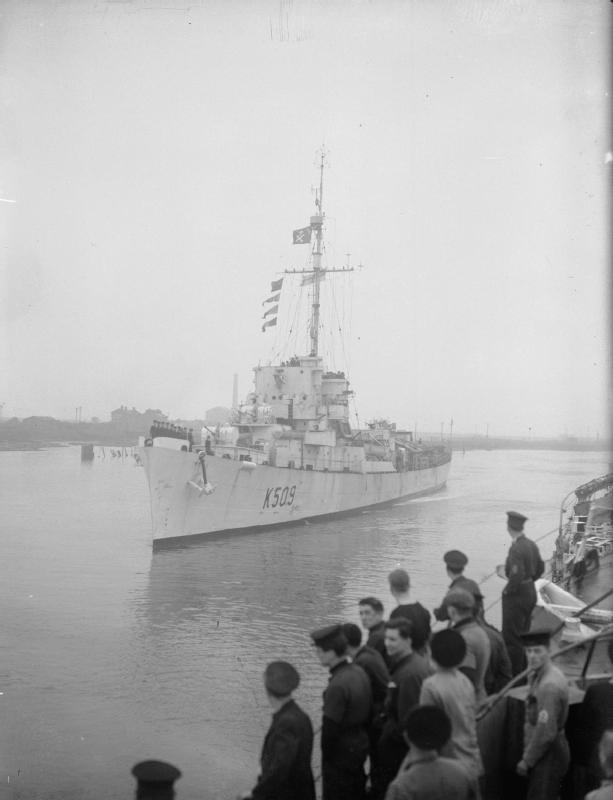
- HMS Conn at Belfast, April 1945

History

United Kingdom
- Name: Conn
- Namesake: Capt. John Conn RN
- Builder: Bethlehem Hingham Shipyard
- Yard number: DE-80
- Laid down: 2 June 1943
- Launched: 21 August 1943
- Commissioned: 31 August 1943
- Decommissioned: Returned to US Navy on 26 November 1945
- Identification: Pennant number: K509
- Fate: Sold for scrap on 21 January 1948

General characteristics
- Displacement: 1,800 long tons (1,829 t) (fully loaded)
- Length: 306 ft (93 m) (overall)
- Beam: 36.5 ft (11.1 m)
- Draught: 9.5 ft (2.9 m) standard; 11.25 ft (3.4 m) full load
- Propulsion: 2 boilers, General Electric Turbo-electric drive 2 solid manganese-bronze 3,600 lb 3-bladed propellers, 8.5 ft (2.6 m) diameter, 7 ft 7 in (2.31 m) pitch 12,000 hp (8.9 MW) 2 rudders
- Speed: 24 knots (44 km/h)
- Endurance: 5,500 nmi (10,200 km) at 15 knots (28 km/h)
- Complement: Typically between 170 & 186

HMS Conn was a TE ("Buckley") Type Captain class frigate of the Royal Navy. She served during World War II as a convoy escort and anti-submarine warfare vessel in the Battle of the Atlantic and was credited with the destruction of two U-boats during the conflict.

== Construction ==
Conn was ordered on 10 January 1942, as DE-80, a long-hulled turbo-diesel (TE) type destroyer escort, one of more than 500 such vessels built for Anti-Submarine Warfare to a collaborative British-American design. She was laid down on 2 June 1943 at the Bethlehem Hingham Shipyard, in Hingham, Massachusetts, and was transferred during construction to the Royal Navy under Lend-Lease. She was launched on 21 August 1943 as HMS Conn, and was completed three months later on 31 October 1943. She was named after Captain John Conn of HMS Dreadnought at the Battle of Trafalgar.

== Service history ==
After commissioning Conn was assigned to Western Approaches Command as a convoy escort and ASW vessel. After several voyages reinforcing a depleted B7 Escort Group in early 1944 Conn was assigned to 21 EG, and in the spring of 1944 part for the escort for several coastal convoys. In June Conn and 21 EG were part of Operation Neptune, the naval component of the Normandy landings escorting convoys and patrolling for U-boats. In October Conn was part of the escort of Arctic convoy JW 61, with a new commander and as senior officer's ship of 21 EG. Her new Commanding Officer was Lt. Cdr. Raymond Hart DSC, an experienced and successful ASW officer.

In January Conn and 21 EG were operating as escort or support group to various Atlantic convoys; one of these, HX 332 came under attack, losing two ships, but despite an extensive hunt the U-boat (U-825) was not found. In March 1945 Conn and 21 EG were assigned to patrol the north-east coast of Scotland; during this period the group found and destroyed four U-boats, with Conn being credited with two of these.

After the German surrender in May 1945 Conn moved to general duties, and with the final end of the war in August 1945 was prepared for return under the Lend-Lease agreement, to the United States for eventual disposal.

== Battle honours ==
Conn earned the following battle honours for service:

- Arctic 1944
- Atlantic 1944-45
- English Channel 1944
- North Sea 1944-45

== Successes ==
During her service Conn was credited with the destruction of two U-boats.

Date	U-boat	Type	Location	Notes
27 March 1945	Was thought to be U-965, now thought to be U-905	VIIC	NW of Cape Wrath	Depth-charged by Conn: confirmed a few days later by "tin-opener" attack from HMS Escapade
30 March 1945	Was thought to be U-1021, now thought to be U-965	VIIC	W of Cape Wrath	d/c by Rupert, Conn as it was tracking convoy EN 83

== Depiction ==
A Stephen Bone painting of the bridge of HMS Conn as she escorts surrendering U-boats at the end of the war is part of the Imperial War Museum's art collection. It is titled On Board HMS Conn Watching the Arrival of Fourteen U-Boats Which Surrendered at Loch Eriboll, Sutherlandshire: 7.30 PM.
