= HMCS Ungava =

Several Canadian naval units have been named HMCS Ungava.

- HMCS Ungava (J149), a Bangor-class minesweeper commissioned on 5 September 1941 and decommissioned on 3 April 1946.
- HMCS Ungava (MCB 148), a Bay-class minesweeper commissioned on 4 June 1954 and decommissioned on 23 August 1957 upon her transfer to Turkey.

== Battle honours ==
- Atlantic 1941–45
- Gulf of St. Lawrence 1944
