= HMCS Outarde =

WW2 Minesweeper

History

Canada
- Name: Outarde
- Namesake: Outarde Bay, Quebec
- Builder: North Van Ship Repair, North Vancouver
- Laid down: 15 October 1940
- Launched: 27 January 1941
- Commissioned: 4 December 1941
- Decommissioned: 24 November 1945
- Identification: Pennant number: J161
- Fate: Sold 1946 for mercantile conversion

General characteristics
- Class & type: Bangor-class minesweeper
- Displacement: 672 long tons (683 t)
- Length: 180 ft (54.9 m) oa
- Beam: 28 ft 6 in (8.7 m)
- Draught: 9 ft 9 in (3.0 m)
- Propulsion: 2 Admiralty 3-drum water tube boilers, 2 shafts, vertical triple-expansion reciprocating engines, 2,400 ihp (1,790 kW)
- Speed: 16.5 knots (31 km/h)
- Complement: 83
- Armament: 1 x QF 3 in (76 mm) 20 cwt gun; 1 × QF 2-pounder Mark VIII; 2 × QF 20 mm Oerlikon guns; 40 depth charges as escort

HMCS Outarde (pennant J161) was a Bangor-class minesweeper constructed for the Royal Canadian Navy during the Second World War. Entering service in 1941, the ship spent the entire war on the West Coast of Canada. Following the end of the war, the vessel was sold in 1946 for mercantile conversion and renamed Psing Hsin. In 1950 the vessel was sold again and renamed Content and remained in service until broken up for scrap in 1951.

== Design and description ==
A British design, the Bangor-class minesweepers were smaller than the preceding Halcyon-class minesweepers in British service, but larger than the Fundy class in Canadian service. They came in two versions powered by different engines; those with a diesel engines and those with vertical triple-expansion steam engines. Outarde was of the latter design and was larger than her diesel-engined cousins. Outarde was 180 feet (54.9 m) long overall, had a beam of 28 feet 6 inches (8.7 m) and a draught of 9 feet 9 inches (3.0 m). The minesweeper had a displacement of 672 long tons (683 t). She had a complement of 6 officers and 77 enlisted.

Outarde had two vertical triple-expansion steam engines, each driving one shaft, using steam provided by two Admiralty three-drum boilers. The engines produced a total of 2,400 indicated horsepower (1,800 kW) and gave a maximum speed of 16.5 knots (30.6 km/h; 19.0 mph). The minesweeper could carry a maximum of 150 long tons (152 t) of fuel oil.

The minesweeper was armed initially with a single quick-firing (QF) 4-inch (102 mm)/40 caliber Mk IV gun mounted forward that was later replaced with a single QF 3-inch (76 mm) 20 cwt gun mounted forward. (Note: "Cwt" is the abbreviation for hundredweight, 20 cwt referring to the weight of the gun.) The ship was also fitted with a QF 2-pounder Mark VIII aft and was eventually fitted with single-mounted QF 20 mm Oerlikon guns on the bridge wings. Those ships assigned to convoy duty were armed with two depth charge launchers and four chutes to deploy their 40 depth charges.

== Operational history ==
The minesweeper was ordered as part of the 1939–40 building programme. The ship's keel was laid down by North Vancouver Ship Repairs Ltd. at their yard in North Vancouver, British Columbia. Named for a bay in Quebec, Outarde was launched on 27 January 1941 and commissioned into the Royal Canadian Navy at Vancouver on 4 December 1941.

Outarde spent the entirety of the Second World War on the West Coast of Canada. Assigned to the patrol units Esquimalt Force (operating out of Esquimalt, British Columbia) or Prince Rupert Force (operating out of Prince Rupert, British Columbia), the main duty of Bangor-class minesweepers after commissioning on the West Coast was to perform the Western Patrol. This consisted of patrolling the west coast of Vancouver Island, inspecting inlets and sounds and past the Scott Islands to Gordon Channel at the entrance to the Queen Charlotte Strait and back. On 13 July 1942, Outarde, Chignecto, the corvette Dawson and the American destroyer USS Hatfield escorted four American troop transports carrying 5,000 Canadian troops from Esquimalt for the invasion of Kiska.

Following the war Outarde was paid off on 24 November 1945 at Esquimalt. The vessel was sold for mercantile conversion in 1946 and renamed Psing Hsin. Registered in Shanghai the 663 GRT vessel was owned by Chung Yuan SN Co. The vessel was sold in 1950 to Transcontinental Corporation, registered in Monrovia and renamed Content. The merchant ship was broken up in Hong Kong beginning on 13 January 1951.
