= Canso =

Canso may refer to:

== Literature ==
- Canso (song), a troubadour form

== Places ==
- Canso, Nova Scotia, a small fishing community in eastern Nova Scotia, Canada
- Canso Islands, a small group of islands off the coast of Canso and a national historic site
- Cape Canso, a cape near the abovementioned community in Nova Scotia, Canada
- Strait of Canso, between Cape Breton Island and mainland Nova Scotia, Canada
- Canso Rocks, Graham Land, Antarctica
- Canso (crater), a crater on Mars, named after the Nova Scotian town

== Military ==
- HMCS Canso, a Royal Canadian Navy minesweeper in commission from 1942 to 1945
- HMS Canso, more than one ship of the British Royal Navy
- PBY Canso, a World War II-era patrol bomber flying boat flown by the Royal Canadian Air Force

== Transportation ==
- Acadian Canso, an automobile produced by General Motors of Canada
- Canso Causeway, a rock-fill causeway connecting Cape Breton Island to mainland Nova Scotia, Canada
- Civil Air Navigation Services Organisation (CANSO), an international representative body of companies that provide air traffic control services
