= PNS Dacca =

At least two ships of the Pakistan Navy have been named Dacca:

- PNS Dacca (1948), a Bangor-class minesweeper launched as HMIS Oudh in 1942 she was transferred to Pakistan and renamed in 1948. She was discarded by 1959
- PNS Dacca (A41), a Mission Buenaventura-class replenishment oiler launched as Mission Santa Clara in 1944 she was transferred to Pakistan and renamed in 1963
