= J65 =

J65 may refer to:

- Augmented truncated tetrahedron
- HMS Bridlington (J65), a minesweeper of the Royal Navy
- LNER Class J65, a British steam locomotive class
- Wright J65, a turbojet engine
