= HMCS Lockeport =

Minesweeper of Bangor Class

History

United Kingdom
- Name: Lockeport
- Builder: North Van Ship Repair, North Vancouver
- Laid down: 17 June 1941
- Launched: 22 August 1941
- Identification: pennant J100
- Fate: Loaned to Royal Canadian Navy 1942

Canada
- Name: Lockeport
- Namesake: Lockeport, Nova Scotia
- Commissioned: 27 May 1942
- Decommissioned: 2 July 1945
- Honours and awards: Gulf of St. Lawrence 1944
- Fate: returned to Royal Navy 1945, broken up 1948

General characteristics
- Class & type: Bangor-class minesweeper
- Displacement: 672 long tons (683 t)
- Length: 180 ft (54.9 m) oa
- Beam: 28 ft 6 in (8.7 m)
- Draught: 9 ft 9 in (3.0 m)
- Propulsion: 2 Admiralty 3-drum water tube boilers, 2 shafts, vertical triple-expansion reciprocating engines, 2,400 ihp (1,790 kW)
- Speed: 16.5 knots (31 km/h)
- Complement: 83
- Armament: 1 × 12-pounder (3 in (76 mm)) 12 cwt HA gun; 2 × QF 20 mm Oerlikon guns; 40 depth charges as escort

HMCS Lockeport (pennant J100) was a Bangor-class minesweeper initially constructed for the Royal Navy during the Second World War. Loaned to the Royal Canadian Navy in 1942, the minesweeper saw service on both coasts of Canada as a patrol vessel and convoy escort. Returned to the Royal Navy in 1945, Lockeport was discarded in 1948.

== Design and description ==
A British design, the Bangor-class minesweepers were smaller than the preceding Halcyon-class minesweepers in British service, but larger than the Fundy class in Canadian service. They came in two versions powered by different engines; those with a diesel engines and those with vertical triple-expansion steam engines. Lockeport was of the latter design and was larger than her diesel-engined cousins. Lockeport was 180 feet (54.9 m) long overall, had a beam of 28 feet 6 inches (8.7 m) and a draught of 9 feet 9 inches (3.0 m). The minesweeper had a displacement of 672 long tons (683 t). She had a complement of 6 officers and 77 enlisted.

Lockeport had two vertical triple-expansion steam engines, each driving one shaft, using steam provided by two Admiralty three-drum boilers. The engines produced a total of 2,400 indicated horsepower (1,800 kW) and gave a maximum speed of 16.5 knots (30.6 km/h; 19.0 mph). The minesweeper could carry a maximum of 150 long tons (152 t) of fuel oil.

British Bangor-class minesweepers were armed with a single 12-pounder (3 in (76 mm)) 12 cwt HA gun mounted forward. (Note: "Cwt" is the abbreviation for hundredweight, 20 cwt referring to the weight of the gun.) For anti-aircraft purposes, the minesweepers were equipped with one QF 2-pounder Mark VIII and two single-mounted QF 20 mm Oerlikon guns. As a convoy escort, Lockeport was deployed with 40 depth charges launched from two depth charge throwers and four chutes.

== Operational history ==
The minesweeper was ordered as part of the British 1940 construction programme. The ship's keel was laid down on 17 June 1941 by North Vancouver Ship Repairs at their yard in North Vancouver, British Columbia. Named for a community in Nova Scotia, Lockeport was launched on 22 August 1941. Transferred to the Royal Canadian Navy, the ship was commissioned on 27 May 1942 at Vancouver.

Following work ups, the minesweeper joined Esquimalt Force in May 1942, the local patrol and convoy escort force operating out of Esquimalt, British Columbia. Lockeport was one of the warships added to the west coast patrol force after the Japanese attack on Pearl Harbor. The main duty of Bangor-class minesweepers after commissioning on the West Coast was to perform the Western Patrol. This consisted of patrolling the west coast of Vancouver Island, inspecting inlets and sounds and past the Scott Islands to Gordon Channel at the entrance to the Queen Charlotte Strait and back. On 20 June 1942, the Japanese submarine I-26 shelled the lighthouse at Estevan Point on the west coast of Vancouver Island. Lockeport, which had been returning to port after a patrol, was among the warships sent to respond to the attack, arriving 5 1/2 hours after the attack. No contact with the Japanese submarine was made. Lockeport remained with Esquimalt Force until ordered to the Atlantic Coast of Canada in March 1943.

After arriving at Halifax, Nova Scotia on 30 April 1943 the minesweeper was assigned to the Western Local Escort Force as a convoy escort in the Battle of the Atlantic. In June 1943, the vessel joined Halifax Force, the local patrol and escort force operating from Halifax. In November, Lockeport was sent to join Newfoundland Force, the patrol and escort force operating from St. John's, Newfoundland. However, in December the minesweeper was withdrawn due to engine troubles.

Lockeport was sent to Baltimore, Maryland to undergo a refit and while in transit on 9 January 1944, her engines broke down. The minesweeper sailed 190 nautical miles (350 km; 220 mi) under an improvised sail before a ship capable of towing her arrived. Work ups were performed in Bermuda and Lockeport escorted the 78th Motor Launch Flotilla on her return to Nova Scotia. In May 1944, the warship was assigned to the patrol and escort force operating from Sydney, Nova Scotia, Sydney Force. The minesweeper remained with this unit until leaving Canada in May 1945 for the United Kingdom.

The minesweeper was paid off on 2 July 1945 at Sheerness and returned to the Royal Navy. The vessel never entered service with the Royal Navy and was laid up following her return. Lockeport was sold on 1 January 1948 and broken up at Gateshead.
