= HMCS Malpeque =

History

Canada
- Name: Malpeque
- Namesake: Malpeque Bay, Prince Edward Island
- Builder: North Van Ship Repair, North Vancouver
- Laid down: 24 April 1940
- Launched: 5 September 1940
- Commissioned: 4 August 1941
- Decommissioned: 9 October 1945
- Identification: Pennant number: J148
- Honours and awards: Atlantic 1941-42, Normandy 1944
- Fate: Sold 1959 for scrap

General characteristics
- Class & type: Bangor-class minesweeper
- Displacement: 672 long tons (683 t)
- Length: 180 ft (54.9 m) oa
- Beam: 28 ft 6 in (8.7 m)
- Draught: 9 ft 9 in (3.0 m)
- Propulsion: 2 Admiralty 3-drum water tube boilers, 2 shafts, vertical triple-expansion reciprocating engines, 2,400 ihp (1,790 kW)
- Speed: 16.5 knots (31 km/h)
- Complement: 83
- Armament: 1 × 12-pounder (3 in (76 mm)) 12 cwt HA gun; 1 × QF 2-pounder Mark VIII; 2 × QF 20 mm Oerlikon guns; 40 depth charges as escort

HMCS Malpeque (pennant J148) was a Bangor-class minesweeper constructed for the Royal Canadian Navy during the Second World War. Entering service in 1941, the minesweeper took part in the Battle of the Atlantic and the invasion of Normandy. Malpeque was decommissioned in 1945 and placed in reserve. The vessel was reacquired during the Korean War, however the ship never re-entered service and was sold for scrap in 1959.

== Design and description ==
A British design, the Bangor-class minesweepers were smaller than the preceding Halcyon-class minesweepers in British service, but larger than the Fundy class in Canadian service. They came in two versions powered by different engines; those with a diesel engines and those with vertical triple-expansion steam engines. Malpeque was of the latter design and was larger than her diesel-engined cousins. Malpeque was 180 feet (54.9 m) long overall, had a beam of 28 feet 6 inches (8.7 m) and a draught of 9 feet 9 inches (3.0 m). The minesweeper had a displacement of 672 long tons (683 t). She had a complement of 6 officers and 77 enlisted.

Malpeque had two vertical triple-expansion steam engines, each driving one shaft, using steam provided by two Admiralty three-drum boilers. The engines produced a total of 2,400 indicated horsepower (1,800 kW) and gave a maximum speed of 16.5 knots (30.6 km/h; 19.0 mph). The minesweeper could carry a maximum of 150 long tons (152 t) of fuel oil.

Malpeque was armed with a single quick-firing (QF) 4-inch (102 mm)/40 caliber Mk IV gun mounted forward. This was later replaced with a 12-pounder (3 in (76 mm)) 12 cwt HA gun. (Note: "Cwt" is the abbreviation for hundredweight, 20 cwt referring to the weight of the gun.) For anti-aircraft purposes, the minesweeper was equipped with one QF 2-pounder Mark VIII and two single-mounted QF 20 mm Oerlikon guns. The 2-pounder gun was later replaced with a powered twin 20 mm Oerlikon mount. As a convoy escort, Malpeque was deployed with 40 depth charges launched from two depth charge throwers and four chutes.

== Operational history ==
The minesweeper was ordered as part of the 1939–40 building programme. The ship's keel was laid down on 24 April 1940 by North Vancouver Ship Repairs Ltd. at their yard in North Vancouver, British Columbia. Malpeque was launched on 5 September 1940 and commissioned into the Royal Canadian Navy on 4 August 1941 at Vancouver.

After commissioning, the minesweeper transferred to the East Coast of Canada, arriving at Halifax, Nova Scotia on 19 October 1941. Malpeque was initially assigned to Sydney Force, the local patrol and escort force operating out of Sydney, Nova Scotia. The vessel transferred to Newfoundland Force, the patrol and escort force operating out of St. John's, Newfoundland. She remained with Newfoundland Force until 19 February 1944, when the minesweeper sailed for Europe as part of Canada's contribution to the invasion of Normandy.

Malpeque arrived in March 1944 and was assigned to the 31st Minesweeping Flotilla, an all-Canadian flotilla of minesweepers taking part in the D-Day invasions. During the invasion, Malpeque and her fellow minesweepers swept and marked channels through the German minefields leading into the invasion beaches. The 31st Minesweeping Flotilla swept channel 3 on 6 June, completing the task unmolested by the Germans.

The minesweeper returned to Canada in April 1945 to undergo a refit at Liverpool, Nova Scotia. After completion of the refit, Malpeque returned to European waters in June rejoining the 31st Minesweeping Flotilla. The flotilla spent the next few months sweeping the English Channel for mines. The ship remained in European waters until September when Malpeque returned to Canada and was paid off on 9 October 1945. The minesweeper was then placed in reserve at Shelburne, Nova Scotia.

In 1946, Malpeque was moved to the strategic reserve at Sorel, Quebec. During the Korean War, the vessel was reacquired by the Royal Canadian Navy, given the new hull number FSE 186 and re-designated a coastal escort. However, the ship was never recommissioned and was laid up at Sydney until sold for scrap in February 1959 to Marine Industries and broken up at Sorel.
