= J21 =

J21 or J-21 may refer to:

== Vehicles ==
=== Aircraft ===
- Junkers J 21, a German reconnaissance aircraft
- SAAB J 21, a Swedish fighter
- Shenyang J-21, a Chinese prototype fighter
- Soko J-21 Jastreb, a Yugoslav light attack aircraft

=== Locomotives ===
- LNER Class J21, a British steam locomotive class

=== Ships ===
- HMCS Canso (J21), a Bangor-class minesweeper of the Royal Navy and Royal Canadian Navy
- HSwMS Södermanland (J21), an Östergötland-class destroyer of the Swedish Navy
- INS Darshak (J21), a survey ship of the Indian Navy

== Other uses ==
- Bronchiolitis
- County Route J21 (California)
- Elongated pentagonal rotunda, a Johnson solid (J_{21})
