= HMCS Bayfield =

History

United Kingdom
- Name: Bayfield
- Builder: North Vancouver Ship Repairs, North Vancouver
- Laid down: 30 December 1940
- Launched: 26 May 1941
- Identification: pennant J08
- Fate: Loaned to Royal Canadian Navy 1942

Canada
- Name: Bayfield
- Namesake: Bayfield, Nova Scotia
- Commissioned: 26 February 1942
- Decommissioned: 24 September 1945
- Honours and awards: Atlantic 1943-44, Normandy 1944
- Fate: returned to Royal Navy 1945, broken up 1948

General characteristics
- Class & type: Bangor-class minesweeper
- Displacement: 672 long tons (683 t)
- Length: 180 ft (54.9 m) oa
- Beam: 28 ft 6 in (8.7 m)
- Draught: 9 ft 9 in (3.0 m)
- Propulsion: 2 Admiralty 3-drum water tube boilers, 2 shafts, vertical triple-expansion reciprocating engines, 2,400 ihp (1,790 kW)
- Speed: 16.5 knots (31 km/h)
- Complement: 83
- Armament: 1 × 12-pounder (3 in (76 mm)) 12 cwt HA gun; 2 × QF 20 mm Oerlikon guns; 40 depth charges as escort

HMCS Bayfield (pennant J08) was a Bangor-class minesweeper initially constructed for the Royal Navy during the Second World War. Transferred to the Royal Canadian Navy in 1942, the minesweeper saw service on both the West and East Coasts of Canada as a convoy escort and patrol vessel. In 1944, Bayfield sailed for European waters and took part in the invasion of Normandy. She remained in European waters for the rest of the war and was returned to the United Kingdom in September 1945. The minesweeper was laid up until being discarded for scrap in 1948.

== Design and description ==
A British design, the Bangor-class minesweepers were smaller than the preceding Halcyon-class minesweepers in British service, but larger than the Fundy class in Canadian service. They came in two versions powered by different engines; those with a diesel engines and those with vertical triple-expansion steam engines. Bayfield was of the latter design and was larger than her diesel-engined cousins. Bayfield was 180 feet (54.9 m) long overall, had a beam of 28 feet 6 inches (8.7 m) and a draught of 9 feet 9 inches (3.0 m). The minesweeper had a displacement of 672 long tons (683 t). She had a complement of 6 officers and 77 enlisted.

Bayfield had two vertical triple-expansion steam engines, each driving one shaft, using steam provided by two Admiralty three-drum boilers. The engines produced a total of 2,400 indicated horsepower (1,800 kW) and gave a maximum speed of 16.5 knots (30.6 km/h; 19.0 mph). The minesweeper could carry a maximum of 150 long tons (152 t) of fuel oil.

British Bangor-class minesweepers were armed with a single 12-pounder (3 in (76 mm)) 12 cwt HA gun mounted forward. (Note: "Cwt" is the abbreviation for hundredweight, 20 cwt referring to the weight of the gun.) For anti-aircraft purposes, the minesweepers were equipped with one QF 2-pounder Mark VIII and two single-mounted QF 20 mm Oerlikon guns. The 2-pounder gun was later replaced with a twin 20 mm Oerlikon mount. As a convoy escort, Bayfield was deployed with 40 depth charges launched from two depth charge throwers and four chutes.

== Operational history ==
The minesweeper was ordered as part of the British 1940 construction programme. The ship's keel was laid down on 30 December 1940 by North Vancouver Ship Repairs at their yard in North Vancouver, British Columbia. Named for a community in Nova Scotia, Bayfield was launched on 26 May 1941. Transferred to the Royal Canadian Navy, the ship was commissioned on 26 February 1942.

Following work ups, the minesweeper joined Esquimalt Force in May 1942, the local patrol and convoy escort force operating out of Esquimalt, British Columbia. Bayfield was one of the warships added to the west coast patrol force after the Japanese attack on Pearl Harbor. The main duty of Bangor-class minesweepers after commissioning on the West Coast was to perform the Western Patrol. This consisted of patrolling the west coast of Vancouver Island, inspecting inlets and sounds and past the Scott Islands to Gordon Channel at the entrance to the Queen Charlotte Strait and back. Bayfield transferred to Prince Rupert Force, the local patrol and convoy escort force operating out of Prince Rupert, British Columbia in November.

In March 1943, Bayfield was reassigned to the East Coast of Canada, arriving at Halifax, Nova Scotia on 30 April 1943. The minesweeper was then sent to Baltimore, Maryland in the United States to undergo a refit. Following the refit, Bayfield returned to Canada to join Halifax Force, the local patrol and escort force operating out of Halifax.

In February 1944, Bayfield sailed for European waters as part of Canada's contribution to the invasion of Normandy. After arriving at Plymouth on 7 March, the minesweeper was assigned to the all-Canadian 31st Minesweeping Flotilla. The 31st Minesweeping Flotilla was assigned to the assault sweep during the landings on 6 June and cleared channel 3 in the American sector. During the sweep, Bayfield served as a danlayer, marking the swept channel. The minesweepers completed their work unmolested by the Germans ashore.

Following D-day operations, the minesweeper remained in European waters assigned to Plymouth Command until being paid off on 24 September 1945 before being transferred back to the United Kingdom. Bayfield was laid up in reserve at Sheerness until 1948. The minesweeper was sold on 1 January 1948 and broken up by King at Gateshead.
