= Ardron =

Ardron is an English surname. Notable people with the surname include:

- Tyler Ardron (born 1991), Canadian rugby union player
- Wally Ardron (1918–1978), English footballer

== See also ==
- Ardrossan (disambiguation)
- Arron
