= HMCS Ingonish =

History

United Kingdom
- Name: Ingonish
- Builder: North Van Ship Repair, North Vancouver
- Laid down: 6 June 1941
- Launched: 30 July 1941
- Identification: pennant J69
- Fate: Loaned to Royal Canadian Navy 1942

Canada
- Name: Ingonish
- Namesake: Ingonish, Nova Scotia
- Commissioned: 8 May 1942
- Decommissioned: 2 July 1945
- Honours and awards: Atlantic 1944, Gulf of St. Lawrence 1944
- Fate: returned to Royal Navy 1945, broken up 1948

General characteristics
- Class & type: Bangor-class minesweeper
- Displacement: 672 long tons (683 t)
- Length: 180 ft (54.9 m) oa
- Beam: 28 ft 6 in (8.7 m)
- Draught: 9 ft 9 in (3.0 m)
- Propulsion: 2 Admiralty 3-drum water tube boilers, 2 shafts, vertical triple-expansion reciprocating engines, 2,400 ihp (1,790 kW)
- Speed: 16.5 knots (31 km/h)
- Complement: 83
- Armament: 1 × 12-pounder (3 in (76 mm)) 12 cwt HA gun; 2 × QF 20 mm Oerlikon guns; 40 depth charges as escort

HMCS Ingonish (pennant J69) was a Bangor-class minesweeper initially constructed for the Royal Navy during the Second World War. Loaned to the Royal Canadian Navy in 1942, the vessel served on both coasts of Canada as a convoy escort and patrol vessel. Following the war, the minesweeper was returned to the Royal Navy and laid up. Ingonish was discarded in 1948.

== Design and description ==
A British design, the Bangor-class minesweepers were smaller than the preceding Halcyon-class minesweepers in British service, but larger than the Fundy class in Canadian service. They came in two versions powered by different engines; those with a diesel engines and those with vertical triple-expansion steam engines. Ingonish was of the latter design and was larger than her diesel-engined cousins. Ingonish was 180 feet (54.9 m) long overall, had a beam of 28 feet 6 inches (8.7 m) and a draught of 9 feet 9 inches (3.0 m). The minesweeper had a displacement of 672 long tons (683 t). She had a complement of 6 officers and 77 enlisted.

Ingonish had two vertical triple-expansion steam engines, each driving one shaft, using steam provided by two Admiralty three-drum boilers. The engines produced a total of 2,400 indicated horsepower (1,800 kW) and gave a maximum speed of 16.5 knots (30.6 km/h; 19.0 mph). The minesweeper could carry a maximum of 150 long tons (152 t) of fuel oil.

British Bangor-class minesweepers were armed with a single 12-pounder (3 in (76 mm)) 12 cwt HA gun mounted forward. (Note: "Cwt" is the abbreviation for hundredweight, 20 cwt referring to the weight of the gun.) For anti-aircraft purposes, the minesweepers were equipped with one QF 2-pounder Mark VIII and two single-mounted QF 20 mm Oerlikon guns. As a convoy escort, Ingonish was deployed with 40 depth charges launched from two depth charge throwers and four chutes.

== Operational history ==
The minesweeper was ordered as part of the British 1940 construction programme. The ship's keel was laid down on 6 June 1941 by North Vancouver Ship Repairs at their yard in North Vancouver, British Columbia. Named for a community in Nova Scotia, Ingonish was launched on 30 July 1941. Transferred to the Royal Canadian Navy, the ship was commissioned on 8 May 1942 at Vancouver.

Following work ups, the minesweeper joined Esquimalt Force in May 1942, the local patrol and convoy escort force operating out of Esquimalt, British Columbia. Ingonish was one of the warships added to the west coast patrol force after the Japanese attack on Pearl Harbor. The main duty of Bangor-class minesweepers after commissioning on the West Coast was to perform the Western Patrol. This consisted of patrolling the west coast of Vancouver Island, inspecting inlets and sounds and past the Scott Islands to Gordon Channel at the entrance to the Queen Charlotte Strait and back. The minesweeper was later transferred to Prince Rupert Force, the patrol and escort unit operating out of Prince Rupert, British Columbia and remained on the Pacific coast until March 1943, when Ingonish was ordered to the Atlantic Coast of Canada.

After arriving at Halifax, Nova Scotia on 30 April 1943, the minesweeper was assigned to the Western Local Escort Force as a convoy escort. In June, Ingonish transferred to Halifax Force, the local escort and patrol force operating from Halifax. That November, the warship was sent to Baltimore, Maryland for a refit, which took nine weeks to complete. In May 1944, the minesweeper joined Sydney Force, the local patrol and escort force working out of Sydney, Nova Scotia and remained with the unit until February 1945. The vessel returned to Halifax Force in February and underwent a second refit at Saint John, New Brunswick.

Following the refit, Ingonish was sent to Bermuda for work ups and then sailed for the United Kingdom in June 1945. The minesweeper was paid off and returned to the Royal Navy at Sheerness on 2 July 1945. Never entering service with the Royal Navy, the vessel was placed in reserve. Ingonish was sold on 1 January 1948 to Clayton & Davie for scrap and broken up at Dunston, Tyne and Wear.
