= J50 =

J50 may refer to:

== Vehicles ==
- Beechcraft J50 Twin Bonanza, an American civil utility aircraft
- HMS Bridport (J50), a minesweeper of the Royal Navy
- Ferrari J50, an Italian sports car
- GNR Class J50, a British steam locomotive class
- Infiniti QX50 (J50), a Japanese SUV
- LNER Class J50, a British steam locomotive class
- Toyota Land Cruiser (J50), a Japanese off-road vehicle
- Shenyang J-50, a Chinese military aircraft

== Other uses ==
- Biaugmented triangular prism (J_{50}), the 50th Johnson solid
- Scarlet (orca), a killer whale, catalogued as "J50"
- Gibson J-50, a guitar

== See also ==
- J5 (disambiguation)
- 50 (disambiguation)
- J (disambiguation)
