= HMCS Miramichi (J169) =

Royal Canadian Navy minesweeper

History

Canada
- Name: Miramichi
- Namesake: Miramichi, New Brunswick
- Ordered: 23 February 1940
- Builder: Burrard Dry Dock Co. Ltd., North Vancouver
- Laid down: 3 November 1940
- Launched: 2 September 1941
- Commissioned: 26 November 1941
- Decommissioned: 24 October 1945
- Identification: Pennant number: J169
- Fate: Sold for scrap.

General characteristics
- Class & type: Bangor-class minesweeper
- Displacement: 672 long tons (683 t)
- Length: 180 ft (54.9 m) oa
- Beam: 28 ft 6 in (8.7 m)
- Draught: 9 ft 9 in (3.0 m)
- Propulsion: 2 Admiralty 3-drum water tube boilers, 2 shafts, vertical triple-expansion reciprocating engines, 2,400 ihp (1,790 kW)
- Speed: 16.5 knots (31 km/h)
- Complement: 83
- Armament: 1 × QF 4 in (102 mm)/40 cal Mk IV gun; 1 × QF 2-pounder Mark VIII; 2 × QF 20 mm Oerlikon guns; 40 depth charges as escort

HMCS Miramichi was a Bangor-class minesweeper that served in the Royal Canadian Navy during the Second World War. She remained on the west coast of Canada for the entirety of the war. She was named for Miramichi, New Brunswick. After the war she was purchased with the intent of conversion for mercantile use. However, that never took place and instead, she was scrapped in 1949.

== Design and description ==
A British design, the Bangor-class minesweepers were smaller than the preceding Halcyon-class minesweepers in British service, but larger than the Fundy class in Canadian service. They came in two versions powered by different engines; those with diesel engines and those with vertical triple-expansion steam engines. Miramichi was of the latter design and was larger than her diesel-engined cousins. Miramichi was 180 feet (54.9 m) long overall, had a beam of 28 feet 6 inches (8.7 m) and a draught of 9 feet 9 inches (3.0 m). The minesweeper had a displacement of 672 long tons (683 t). She had a complement of 6 officers and 77 enlisted.

Miramichi had two vertical triple-expansion steam engines, each driving one shaft, using steam provided by two Admiralty three-drum boilers. The engines produced a total of 2,400 indicated horsepower (1,800 kW) and gave a maximum speed of 16.5 knots (30.6 km/h; 19.0 mph). The minesweeper could carry a maximum of 150 long tons (152 t) of fuel oil.

Miramichi was armed with a single quick-firing (QF) 4-inch (102 mm)/40 caliber Mk IV gun mounted forward. (Note: The 40 caliber denotes the length of the gun. This means that the length of the gun barrel is 40 times the bore diameter.) For anti-aircraft purposes, the minesweeper was equipped with one QF 2-pounder Mark VIII and two single-mounted QF 20 mm Oerlikon guns. As a convoy escort, Miramichi was deployed with 40 depth charges.

== Service history ==
Miramichi was ordered on 23 February 1940 as part of the 1939–1940 construction programme. The minesweeper's keel was laid down by Burrard Dry Dock Co. Ltd. at Vancouver, British Columbia and the ship was launched on 2 September 1941. She was commissioned into the Royal Canadian Navy on 26 November 1941 at Vancouver. After commissioning, Miramichi spent the entire war alternating between service with Esquimalt Force and Prince Rupert Force as a minesweeping and patrol vessel. In the summer and fall of 1943, she was occasionally used as a training vessel. She was paid off 24 October 1945 at Esquimalt.

Following the war Miramichi was sold to the Union Steamship Co. of British Columbia in 1946. She was to be converted to a merchant vessel though that was never begun and instead the ship was sold for scrap and broken up at Vancouver in 1949–1950. The city of Miramichi possesses the vessel's bell, which is on display at city hall. The community received the naval bell, following naval tradition in the case of decommissioned Canadian ships named for towns and cities. The Canadian Forces Base Esquimalt Naval and Military Museum naval bell archive includes baptism information from HMCS Miramichi.

== See also ==
- List of ships of the Canadian Navy
