= HMS Canso =

Two ships of the Royal Navy have borne the name HMS Canso, after the town of Canso in Nova Scotia:

- HMS Canso (1813), a schooner captured in 1813 during the War of 1812 and sold in 1816
- HMS Canso (J21), a minesweeper transferred during construction to the Royal Canadian Navy in 1942 for World War II service as HMCS Canso, returned to the Royal Navy in 1945, and broken up in 1948
