= HMCS Trois Rivières =

History

Canada
- Name: Trois Rivières
- Namesake: Trois Rivières, Quebec
- Builder: Marine Industries Ltd. Sorel
- Laid down: 9 December 1940
- Launched: 30 June 1941
- Commissioned: 12 August 1942
- Decommissioned: 31 July 1945
- Identification: Pennant number: J269
- Honours and awards: Atlantic 1942-44, Gulf of St. Lawrence, 1944
- Fate: Scrapped, 1960

General characteristics
- Class & type: Bangor-class minesweeper
- Displacement: 592 long tons (601 t)
- Length: 162 ft (49.4 m)
- Beam: 28 ft (8.5 m)
- Draught: 8.25 ft (2.51 m)
- Propulsion: 2 shafts, 9-cylinder diesel, 2,000 bhp (1,500 kW)
- Speed: 16 knots (30 km/h)
- Complement: 83
- Armament: 1 × QF 12-pounder 12 cwt naval gun; 1 × QF 2-pounder Mark VIII; 2 × QF 20 mm Oerlikon guns; 40 depth charges as escort

HMCS Trois Rivières (pennant J269), alternatively spelled Trois-Rivieres and Trois-Rivières, was a Bangor-class minesweeper that served with the Royal Canadian Navy during the Second World War. The ship entered service in 1942 and served as a patrol and convoy escort vessel in the Battle of the Atlantic. Following the war, the minesweeper was transferred to the Royal Canadian Mounted Police and renamed MacBrien. The vessel was sold for scrap and broken up in 1960.

== Design and description ==
The Bangor class was initially to be a scaled down minesweeper design of the Halcyon class in Royal Navy service. However, due to the difficulty procuring diesel engines led to the small number of the diesel version being completed. The ships displaced 592 long tons (601 t) standard and 690 long tons (700 t) fully loaded. They were 162 feet (49.4 m) long with a beam of 28 feet (8.5 m) and a draught of 8 feet 3 inches (2.51 m). However, the size of the ship led to criticisms of their being too cramped for magnetic or acoustic minesweeping gear. This may have been due to all the additions made during the war with the installation of ASDIC, radar and depth charges.

The Bangor class came in two versions. Trois Rivières was of the diesel-powered version, being equipped with a 9-cylinder diesel engine driving two shafts that produced 2,000 brake horsepower (1,500 kW). This gave the ship a maximum speed of 16.5 knots (30.6 km/h). The vessels carried 65 long tons (66 t) of oil. The vessels had a complement of 6 officers and 77 ratings.

The Canadian diesel-powered Bangors were armed with a single quick-firing (QF) 12-pounder 12 cwt gun mounted forward. (Note: "Cwt" is the abbreviation for hundredweight, 20 cwt referring to the weight of the gun.) The ships were also fitted with a QF 2-pounder Mark VIII gun aft and were eventually fitted with single-mounted QF 20 mm Oerlikon guns on the bridge wings. For those ships assigned to convoy duty, they were armed with two depth charge launchers and two chutes for the 40 depth charges they carried.

== Operational history ==
The minesweeper was ordered as part of the 1940–1941 construction programme. The ship's keel was laid down on 9 December 1940 by Marine Industries at their yard in Sorel, Quebec. Named for a community in Quebec, Trois Rivières was launched on 30 June 1941. The ship was commissioned on 12 August 1942 at Sorel.

The minesweeper was assigned to the Western Local Escort Force after arriving at Halifax, Nova Scotia in August 1942. Trois Rivières transferred to Newfoundland Force, the patrol and escort force operating from St. John's, Newfoundland, in November 1942. Beginning in October 1943, Trois Rivières began a refit at Dalhousie, New Brunswick, that in different stages, took the ship to Halifax and Saint John, New Brunswick before completing in January 1944. Following the refit the ship returned to Newfoundland Force. In February 1945, the minesweeper underwent another refit, this time at Lunenburg, Nova Scotia, which lasted until May. The ship returned to Newfoundland Force and remained with the group until its disbandment in June.

Trois Rivières was paid off on 31 July 1945 and turned over to the Royal Canadian Mounted Police (RCMP) on 3 August 1945. Renamed MacBrien by the RCMP, the ship served on the East Coast of Canada until transferred on permanent loan for conversion to a naval research vessel. However, the conversion was not completed and MacBrien was declared surplus on 13 June 1959. The vessel was sold for scrap and broken up in 1960.
