= Ardrossan (disambiguation) =

Ardrossan is a town in Scotland.

Ardrossan may also refer to:

- Ardrossan, South Australia, a town in Australia
- Ardrossan, Alberta, a Canadian hamlet
- HMS Ardrossan (J131), a Royal Navy minesweeper
- The estate of Helen Hope Montgomery Scott on Philadelphia's Main Line
- Ardrossan Shipbuilding Company, a company in Ardrossan since 1842 to 1969
