= HMCS Bellechasse =

History

Canada
- Name: Bellechasse
- Builder: Burrard Dry Dock Co. Ltd., North Vancouver
- Laid down: 16 April 1941
- Launched: 20 October 1941
- Commissioned: 13 December 1941
- Decommissioned: 23 October 1945
- Identification: Pennant number: J170
- Fate: Sold 1946 for mercantile conversion.

General characteristics
- Class & type: Bangor-class minesweeper
- Displacement: 672 long tons (683 t)
- Length: 180 ft (54.9 m) oa
- Beam: 28 ft 6 in (8.7 m)
- Draught: 9 ft 9 in (3.0 m)
- Propulsion: 2 Admiralty 3-drum water tube boilers, 2 shafts, vertical triple-expansion reciprocating engines, 2,400 ihp (1,790 kW)
- Speed: 16.5 knots (31 km/h)
- Complement: 83
- Armament: 1 × QF 4 in (102 mm)/40 cal Mk IV gun; 1 × QF 2-pounder Mark VIII; 2 × QF 20 mm Oerlikon guns; 40 depth charges as escort

HMCS Bellechasse (pennant J170) was a Bangor-class minesweeper constructed for the Royal Canadian Navy during the Second World War. The minesweeper entered service in 1941 and spent the entire war on the West Coast of Canada. Sold in 1946 for mercantile conversion, the conversion was not carried out and Bellechasse was broken up for scrap instead.

== Design and description ==
A British design, the Bangor-class minesweepers were smaller than the preceding Halcyon-class minesweepers in British service, but larger than the Fundy class in Canadian service. They came in two versions powered by different engines; those with a diesel engines and those with vertical triple-expansion steam engines. Bellechasse was of the latter design and was larger than her diesel-engined cousins. Bellechasse was 180 feet (54.9 m) long overall, had a beam of 28 feet 6 inches (8.7 m) and a draught of 9 feet 9 inches (3.0 m). The minesweeper had a displacement of 672 long tons (683 t). She had a complement of 6 officers and 77 enlisted.

Bellechasse had two vertical triple-expansion steam engines, each driving one shaft, using steam provided by two Admiralty three-drum boilers. The engines produced a total of 2,400 indicated horsepower (1,800 kW) and gave a maximum speed of 16.5 knots (30.6 km/h; 19.0 mph). The minesweeper could carry a maximum of 150 long tons (152 t) of fuel oil.

Bellechasse was armed with a single quick-firing (QF) 4-inch (102 mm)/40 caliber Mk IV gun mounted forward. This was later replaced with a 12-pounder (3 in (76 mm)) 12 cwt HA gun. (Note: "Cwt" is the abbreviation for hundredweight, 20 cwt referring to the weight of the gun.) For anti-aircraft purposes, the minesweeper was equipped with one QF 2-pounder Mark VIII and two single-mounted QF 20 mm Oerlikon guns. The 2-pounder gun was later replaced with a powered twin 20 mm Oerlikon mount. As a convoy escort, Bellechasse was deployed with 40 depth charges launched from two depth charge throwers and four chutes.

== Operational history ==
The minesweeper was ordered as part of the 1939–40 building programme. The ship's keel was laid down on 16 April 1941 by Burrard Dry Dock at their yard in Vancouver, British Columbia. Named for a county in Quebec, Bellechasse was launched on 20 October 1941 and commissioned into the Royal Canadian Navy on 13 December 1941.

Bellechasse spent the entirety of the Second World War on the West Coast of Canada. Assigned to the patrol units Esquimalt Force (operating out of Esquimalt, British Columbia) or Prince Rupert Force (operating out of Prince Rupert, British Columbia), the main duty of Bangor-class minesweepers after commissioning on the West Coast was to perform the Western Patrol. This consisted of patrolling the west coast of Vancouver Island, inspecting inlets and sounds and past the Scott Islands to Gordon Channel at the entrance to the Queen Charlotte Strait and back.

Following the end of the war, Bellechasse was paid off on 23 October 1945 at Esquimalt. The minesweeper was sold to the Union Steamship Company for mercantile conversion in 1946. However, the conversion was not carried out and the ship was broken up for scrap that year.
