= HMCS Thunder (J156) =

1941 Royal Canadian Navy minesweeper

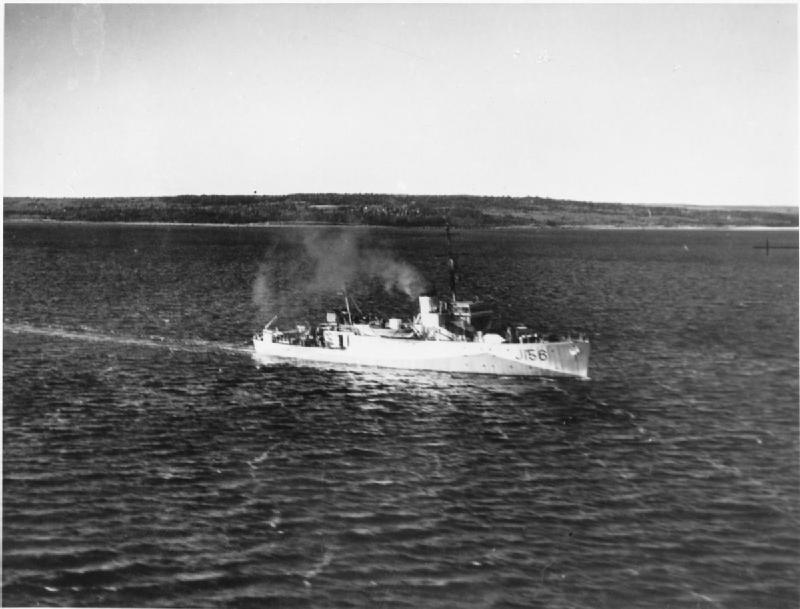
- HMCS Thunder underway

History

Canada
- Name: Thunder
- Builder: Dufferin Shipbuilding Co., Toronto
- Laid down: 4 December 1940
- Launched: 19 March 1941
- Commissioned: 14 October 1941
- Decommissioned: 4 October 1945
- Identification: Pennant number: J156
- Honours and awards: Atlantic 1941–42, 1944
- Fate: Sold for scrap 1947

General characteristics
- Class & type: Bangor-class minesweeper
- Displacement: 672 long tons (683 t)
- Length: 180 ft (54.9 m) oa
- Beam: 28 ft 6 in (8.7 m)
- Draught: 9 ft 9 in (3.0 m)
- Propulsion: 2 Admiralty 3-drum water tube boilers, 2 shafts, vertical triple-expansion reciprocating engines, 2,400 ihp (1,790 kW)
- Speed: 16.5 knots (31 km/h)
- Complement: 83
- Armament: 1 x QF 3 in (76 mm) 20 cwt gun; 1 x QF 2 pdr Mark VIII; 2 × QF 20 mm Oerlikon guns; 40 depth charges as escort

HMCS Thunder (pennant J156) was a Bangor-class minesweeper constructed for the Royal Canadian Navy during the Second World War. The minesweeper entered service in 1941 and took part in the Battle of the Atlantic and the invasion of Normandy. Following the war Thunder was sold for scrap and broken up.

== Design and description ==
A British design, the Bangor-class minesweepers were smaller than the preceding Halcyon-class minesweepers in British service, but larger than the Fundy class in Canadian service. They came in two versions powered by different engines; those with a diesel engines and those with vertical triple-expansion steam engines. Thunder was of the latter design and was larger than her diesel-engined cousins. Thunder was 180 feet (54.9 m) long overall, had a beam of 28 feet 6 inches (8.7 m) and a draught of 9 feet 9 inches (3.0 m). The minesweeper had a displacement of 672 long tons (683 t). She had a complement of 6 officers and 77 enlisted.

Thunder had two vertical triple-expansion steam engines, each driving one shaft, using steam provided by two Admiralty three-drum boilers. The engines produced a total of 2,400 indicated horsepower (1,800 kW) and gave a maximum speed of 16.5 knots (30.6 km/h; 19.0 mph). The minesweeper could carry a maximum of 150 long tons (152 t) of fuel oil.

The minesweeper was armed initially with a single quick-firing (QF) 4-inch (102 mm)/40 caliber Mk IV gun mounted forward that was later replaced with a single QF 3-inch (76 mm) 20 cwt gun mounted forward. (Note: "Cwt" is the abbreviation for hundredweight, 20 cwt referring to the weight of the gun.) The ship was also fitted with a QF 2-pounder Mark VIII aft and was eventually fitted with single-mounted QF 20 mm Oerlikon guns on the bridge wings. Thunder had her 2-pounder gun replaced with a powered twin 20 mm mount in preparation for duties associated with the invasion of Normandy. Those ships assigned to convoy duty were armed with two depth charge launchers and four chutes to deploy their 40 depth charges.

== Operational history ==
The minesweeper was ordered as part of the 1939–40 building programme and the keel was laid down on 4 December 1940 by Dufferin Shipbuilding Co. at their yard in Toronto, Ontario. Thunder was launched on 19 March 1941 and commissioned at Toronto on 14 October 1941.

Thunder sailed for Halifax, Nova Scotia, arriving on 30 October and joined Sydney Force, the local escort and patrol force operating out of Sydney, Nova Scotia. In January 1942, the minesweeper transferred to the Western Local Escort Force as a convoy escort. The ship then bounced around among local forces, joining the Halifax Local Defence Force and then the Shelburne Force operating out of Shelburne, Nova Scotia, then back to Halifax Local Defence Force and finally Sydney Force.

The minesweeper sailed to Europe via the Azores in February 1944 as part of the Canadian contribution to the invasion of Normandy. After arriving on 13 March, the minesweeper was assigned to the 32nd Minesweeping Flotilla as the Senior Officer's Ship. Thunder transferred to the British 4th Minesweeping Flotilla in May. During D-day operations, the 4th Minesweeping Flotilla was assigned to sweep assault channel 4 in the American sector. Once that was completed the 4th Minesweeping Flotilla was ordered to sweep between the channels 3 and 4. Thunder and the 4th Minesweeping Flotilla continued their minesweeping duties off Normandy until 6 June, when they sailed back to Portland to sweep a new minefield that had been laid in the approaches to the harbour. This took the flotilla ten days to complete, after which Thunder was ordered to join American minesweepers for the assault on Cherbourg.

On 24 June, during the preliminary bombardment, the minesweeping force of which Thunder was a member, arrived off Point Barfleur in mid-afternoon. German shore-based gunfire began to splash down around the minesweepers after an hour, leading the escorting United States Navy destroyers to deploy a smokescreen and order the minesweepers to cut sweeps and retire. The following day during the assault, the minesweepers were deployed again. Shore-based gunfire began raining down on the minesweepers again. Thunder was hit by shrapnel from a near miss and the destroyers were once again forced to lay a smokescreen.

Thunder returned to Canada in August 1944 to undergo a refit at Sydney. The minesweeper returned to European waters in November and was assigned to the 31st Minesweeping Flotilla. In April 1945, the 31st Minesweeping Flotilla was assigned to the last large-scale combined operation in the European theatre. Sailing to the Gironde estuary on 12 April, the minesweeping flotilla swept an invasion channel for the attack force landing in the area. Once their minesweeping duties were completed, the minesweepers performed an anti-submarine patrol in the area. They continued in these duties until 16 April when the minesweepers returned to Plymouth. While transiting the Bay of Biscay, Thunder accepted the surrender of the German auxiliary minesweeper FGi 07 and with a prize crew aboard, took the vessel back to the United Kingdom. Thunder and the 31st Minesweeping Flotilla spent the next five months sweeping the English Channel. Thunder remained in European waters until September, when the minesweeper returned to Canada. Thunder was paid off on 4 October 1945 and laid up. The ship was sold to Marine Industries in 1947 and broken up at Sorel, Quebec.
