= HMCS Courtenay =

History

Canada
- Name: Courtenay
- Builder: Prince Rupert Dry Dock & Shipyards Co., Prince Rupert, British Columbia
- Laid down: 28 January 1941
- Launched: 2 August 1941
- Commissioned: 21 March 1942
- Decommissioned: 5 November 1945
- Identification: Pennant number: J262
- Fate: Sold for mercantile service 1946

General characteristics
- Class & type: Bangor-class minesweeper
- Displacement: 672 long tons (683 t)
- Length: 180 ft (54.9 m) oa
- Beam: 28 ft 6 in (8.7 m)
- Draught: 9 ft 9 in (3.0 m)
- Propulsion: 2 Admiralty 3-drum water tube boilers, 2 shafts, vertical triple-expansion reciprocating engines, 2,400 ihp (1,790 kW)
- Speed: 16.5 knots (31 km/h)
- Complement: 83
- Armament: 1 x QF 3-inch (76 mm) 20 cwt gun; 1 x QF 2 pdr Mark VIII; 2 × QF 20 mm Oerlikon guns; 40 depth charges as escort

HMCS Courtenay (pennant J262) was a Bangor-class minesweeper constructed for the Royal Canadian Navy during the Second World War. Entering service in 1942, Courtenay spent the entire war on the West Coast of Canada. The vessel was decommissioned in 1945 and sold for mercantile service in 1946. The fate of the vessel is uncertain.

== Design and description ==
A British design, the Bangor-class minesweepers were smaller than the preceding Halcyon-class minesweepers in British service, but larger than the Fundy class in Canadian service. They came in two versions powered by different engines; those with a diesel engines and those with vertical triple-expansion steam engines. Courtenay was of the latter design and was larger than her diesel-engined cousins. Courtenay was 180 feet (54.9 m) long overall, had a beam of 28 feet 6 inches (8.7 m) and a draught of 9 feet 9 inches (3.0 m). The minesweeper had a displacement of 672 long tons (683 t). She had a complement of 6 officers and 77 enlisted.

Courtenay had two vertical triple-expansion steam engines, each driving one shaft, using steam provided by two Admiralty three-drum boilers. The engines produced a total of 2,400 indicated horsepower (1,800 kW) and gave a maximum speed of 16.5 knots (30.6 km/h; 19.0 mph). The minesweeper could carry a maximum of 150 long tons (152 t) of fuel oil.

The minesweeper was armed with a single quick-firing (QF) 3-inch (76 mm) 20 cwt gun mounted forward. (Note: "Cwt" is the abbreviation for hundredweight, 20 cwt referring to the weight of the gun.) The ship was also fitted with a QF 2-pounder Mark VIII aft and were eventually fitted with single-mounted QF 20 mm Oerlikon guns on the bridge wings. Those ships assigned to convoy duty were armed with two depth charge launchers and four chutes to deploy their 40 depth charges. Courtenay was equipped with SA minesweeping gear for the detection of acoustic naval mines only.

== Operational history ==
The minesweeper was ordered as part of the 1940–41 construction programme. The ship's keel was laid down on 28 January 1941 by Prince Rupert Dry Dock & Shipyards Co. in Prince Rupert, British Columbia. Courtenay was launched on 2 August 1941 and commissioned into the Royal Canadian Navy on 21 March 1942 at Prince Rupert.

Courtenay spent the entirety of the Second World War on the West Coast of Canada. Courtenay was among the eight minesweepers added to the force protecting the West Coast during the first five months of 1942 following the need to establish a larger force following the Japanese attack on Pearl Harbor. Assigned to the patrol units Esquimalt Force (operating out of Esquimalt, British Columbia) or Prince Rupert Force, the main duty of Bangor-class minesweepers after commissioning on the West Coast would be to perform the Western Patrol. Patrolling the west coast of Vancouver Island, inspecting inlets and sounds and past the Scott Islands to Gordon Channel at the entrance to the Queen Charlotte Strait.

Following the end of the war, Courtenay was paid off at Esquimalt on 5 November 1945. The minesweeper was sold to the Union Steamship Company for mercantile conversion on 3 April 1946. However, the conversion never took place and the fate of the vessel remains unknown with Macpherson and Barrie tracking a purchase offer by a San Francisco firm in 1951 and the Miramar Ship Index claiming that the ship was broken up in 1946.
