= HMCS Kelowna =

Canadian minesweeper ship

History

Canada
- Name: Kelowna
- Namesake: Kelowna, British Columbia
- Builder: Prince Rupert Dry Dock & Shipyards Co., Prince Rupert, British Columbia
- Laid down: 27 December 1940
- Launched: 28 May 1941
- Commissioned: 5 February 1942
- Decommissioned: 22 October 1945
- Identification: Pennant number: J261
- Fate: Sold for mercantile service 1946

General characteristics
- Class & type: Bangor-class minesweeper
- Displacement: 672 long tons (683 t)
- Length: 180 ft (54.9 m) oa
- Beam: 28 ft 6 in (8.7 m)
- Draught: 9 ft 9 in (3.0 m)
- Propulsion: 2 Admiralty 3-drum water tube boilers, 2 shafts, vertical triple-expansion reciprocating engines, 2,400 ihp (1,790 kW)
- Speed: 16.5 knots (31 km/h)
- Complement: 83
- Armament: 1 x QF 3-inch (76 mm) 20 cwt gun; 1 x QF 2 pdr Mark VIII; 2 × QF 20 mm Oerlikon guns; 40 depth charges as escort

HMCS Kelowna (pennant J261) was a Bangor-class minesweeper constructed for the Royal Canadian Navy during the Second World War. Entering service in 1942, the minesweeper spent the entire war on the West Coast of Canada, mainly as a patrol vessel. Following the war, Kelowna was sold for mercantile conversion. Renamed Hung Hsin and Condor, the final disposition of the vessel is disputed.

== Design and description ==
A British design, the Bangor-class minesweepers were smaller than the preceding Halcyon-class minesweepers in British service, but larger than the Fundy class in Canadian service. They came in two versions powered by different engines; those with a diesel engines and those with vertical triple-expansion steam engines. Kelowna was of the latter design and was larger than her diesel-engined cousins. The minesweeper was 180 feet (54.9 m) long overall, had a beam of 28 feet 6 inches (8.7 m) and a draught of 9 feet 9 inches (3.0 m). Kelowna had a displacement of 672 long tons (683 t). She had a complement of 6 officers and 77 enlisted.

Kelowna had two vertical triple-expansion steam engines, each driving one shaft, using steam provided by two Admiralty three-drum boilers. The engines produced a total of 2,400 indicated horsepower (1,800 kW) and gave a maximum speed of 16.5 knots (30.6 km/h; 19.0 mph). The minesweeper could carry a maximum of 150 long tons (152 t) of fuel oil.

The minesweeper was armed with a single quick-firing (QF) 3-inch (76 mm) 20 cwt gun mounted forward. (Note: "Cwt" is the abbreviation for hundredweight, 20 cwt referring to the weight of the gun.) The ship was also fitted with a QF 2-pounder Mark VIII aft and were eventually fitted with single-mounted QF 20 mm Oerlikon guns on the bridge wings. Those ships assigned to convoy duty were armed with two depth charge launchers and four chutes to deploy their 40 depth charges. Kelowna was equipped with SA minesweeping gear for the detection of acoustic naval mines only.

== Operational history ==
The minesweeper was ordered as part of the 1940–41 construction programme. The ship's keel was laid down on 27 December 1941 by Prince Rupert Dry Dock & Shipyards Co. in Prince Rupert, British Columbia. Named for a city in British Columbia Kelowna was launched on 28 May 1941 and commissioned into the Royal Canadian Navy on 5 February 1942 at Prince Rupert.

Kelowna spent the entire war on the Pacific coast of Canada. During the war the minesweeper was assigned at times to either Prince Rupert Force, the escort and patrol unit operating from Prince Rupert, or Esquimalt Force, the patrol and escort unit operating from Esquimalt, British Columbia. Kelowna was one of the warships added to the west coast patrol force after the Japanese attack on Pearl Harbor. The main duty of Bangor-class minesweepers after commissioning on the West Coast was to perform the Western Patrol. This consisted of patrolling the west coast of Vancouver Island, inspecting inlets and sounds and past the Scott Islands to Gordon Channel at the entrance to the Queen Charlotte Strait and back. The minesweeper was paid off on 22 October 1945 at Esquimalt.

In 1946 the vessel was sold for mercantile conversion and emerged as the 664 GRT Condor. In 1950, the ship was renamed Hung Hsin and was listed on the Lloyd's Register until 1950. The Miramar Ship Index has the cargo ship emerging as Hung Hsin in 1946 owned Chung Yuan SN Co and registered in Shanghai. In 1950, Hung Hsin was sold to Transcontinental Corporation, renamed Condor and registered in Monrovia, Liberia. Condor was broken up for scrap at Hong Kong beginning 13 January 1951.
