= HMS Blackpool (J27) =

Minesweeper of the Royal Navy

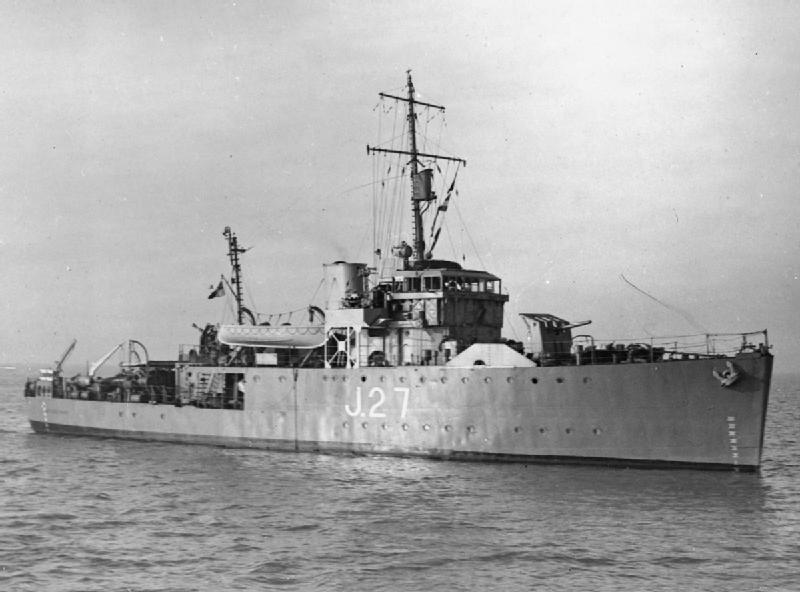
- HMS Blackpool

History

United Kingdom
- Name: HMS Blackpool
- Laid down: 19 September 1939
- Launched: 4 July 1940
- Commissioned: 3 February 1941
- Decommissioned: July 1946
- Stricken: July 1946
- Fate: Transferred to Norway, late 1946

Norway
- Name: HNoMS Tarna
- Commissioned: 9 September 1946
- Stricken: 1 May 1961
- Identification: M-310
- Fate: Scrapped

General characteristics (as built)
- Class & type: Bangor-class minesweeper
- Displacement: 605 long tons (615 t)
- Length: 174 ft (53.0 m) (o/a)
- Beam: 28 ft (8.5 m)
- Draught: 8 ft 3 in (2.5 m)
- Installed power: 2,000 bhp (1,500 kW)
- Propulsion: 2 shafts; diesel engine
- Speed: 16 knots (30 km/h; 18 mph)
- Complement: 60
- Armament: 1 × 12 pdr 3 in (76 mm) gun; 1 × quadruple 0.5 in (12.7 mm) Vickers machine gun

HMS Blackpool (J27) was a diesel-powered British Bangor-class minesweeper that served in World War II. She was paid off and sold to the Royal Norwegian Navy in 1946.

== Description ==
The Bangor-class ships were designed to be mass produced, requiring a minimum of resources and able to be built in small shipyards inexperienced with naval work. The diesel-powered ships had an overall length of 174 feet (53.0 m), a beam of 28 feet (8.5 m), and a draught of 8 feet 3 inches (2.5 m) at full load. They displaced 605 long tons (615 t) at (standard) and 770 long tons (780 t) at full load. The ships had a pair of nine-cylinder diesel engines that drove the two propeller shafts. The engines were designed to produce a total of 2,000 brake horsepower (1,500 kW) which was intended to give the ships a speed of 16 knots (30 km/h; 18 mph). Their crew consisted of 60 officers and ratings.

The armament of the Bangor-class ships consisted of a 12-pounder 3-inch (76 mm) gun mounted forward of the superstructure and a quadruple mount for 0.5 inches (12.7 mm) Vickers machine guns aft. They could carry 40 depth charges when serving as convoy escorts.

== Construction and career ==
HMS Blackpool was ordered on 6 July 1939 from Harland and Wolff, and laid down at their Govan shipyard in Glasgow on 19 September 1939. She was launched on 4 July 1940 and commissioned on 3 February 1941. She was the second ship in the Royal Navy to carry that name.

=== Postwar duties ===
Blackpool continued mine clearing duties near Plymouth until July 1946, when she was paid off to reserve status, and sold to the Royal Norwegian Navy later that year.

=== Royal Norwegian Navy ===
Blackpool was purchased and renamed Tarna by the Royal Norwegian Navy, and remained on the active register of ships until being struck in May 1961.

== Bibliography ==
- Campbell, N. J. M. (1980). "Great Britain (including Empire Forces)". In Chesneau, Roger (ed.). Conway's All the World's Fighting Ships 1922–1946. Conway Maritime Press. pp. 2–85. ISBN 0-85177-146-7.
- Colledge, J. J.; Warlow, Ben & Bush, Steve (2020). Ships of the Royal Navy: The Complete Record of all Fighting Ships of the Royal Navy from the 15th Century to the Present (5th revised and updated ed.). Seaforth Publishing. ISBN 978-1-5267-9327-0.
- Lenton, H. T. (1998). British & Empire Warships of the Second World War. Naval Institute Press. ISBN 1-55750-048-7.
