= HMCS Wasaga =

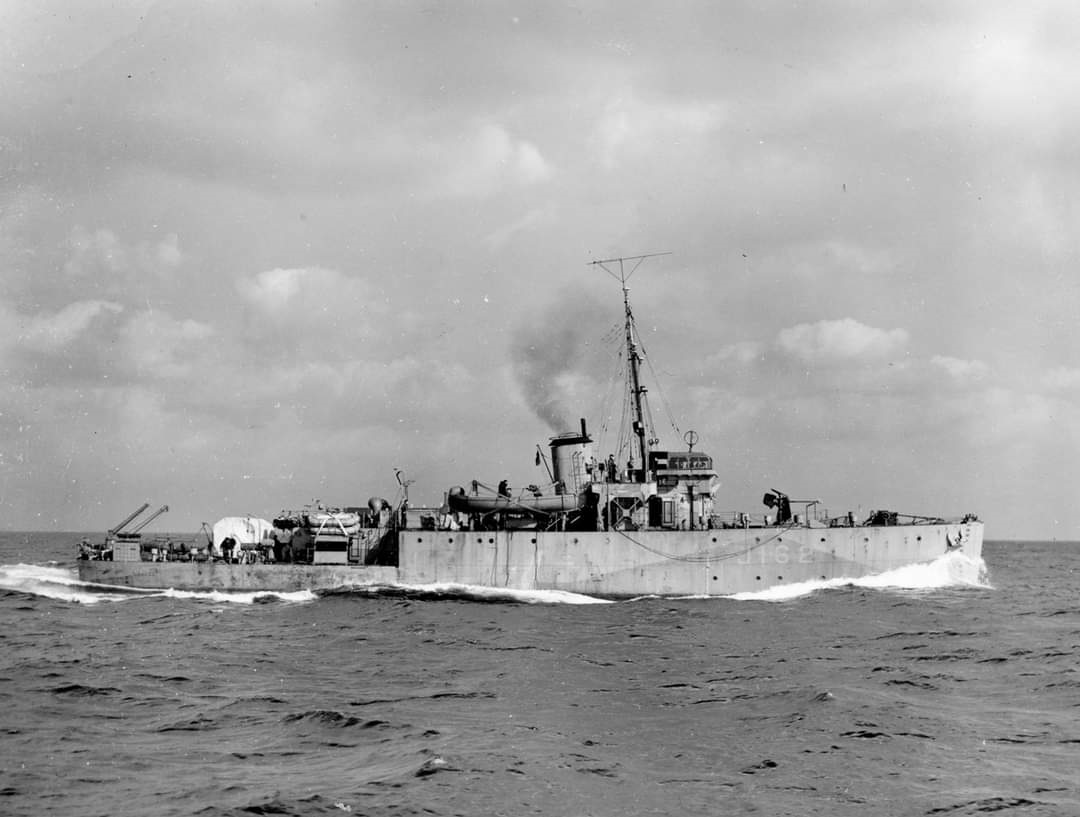
- HMCS Wasaga underway

History

Canada
- Name: Wasaga
- Namesake: Wasaga Beach, Ontario
- Builder: Burrard Dry Dock Co. Ltd., North Vancouver
- Laid down: 3 September 1940
- Launched: 23 January 1941
- Commissioned: 1 July 1941
- Decommissioned: 6 October 1945
- Identification: Pennant number: J162
- Honours and awards: Atlantic 1944, Normandy 1944
- Fate: Sold 1947 for scrap

General characteristics
- Class & type: Bangor-class minesweeper
- Displacement: 672 long tons (683 t)
- Length: 180 ft (54.9 m) oa
- Beam: 28 ft 6 in (8.7 m)
- Draught: 9 ft 9 in (3.0 m)
- Propulsion: 2 Admiralty 3-drum water tube boilers, 2 shafts, vertical triple-expansion reciprocating engines, 2,400 ihp (1,790 kW)
- Speed: 16.5 knots (31 km/h)
- Complement: 83
- Armament: 1 × 12-pounder (3 in (76 mm)) 12 cwt HA gun; 1 × QF 2-pounder Mark VIII; 2 × QF 20 mm Oerlikon guns; 40 depth charges as escort

HMCS Wasaga (pennant J162) was a Bangor-class minesweeper constructed for the Royal Canadian Navy during the Second World War. Entering service in 1941, the minesweeper took part in the Battle of the Atlantic and the invasion of Normandy. Following the end of the war, the vessel was sold in 1946 and broken up for scrap in 1947.

== Design and description ==
A British design, the Bangor-class minesweepers were smaller than the preceding Halcyon-class minesweepers in British service, but larger than the Fundy class in Canadian service. They came in two versions powered by different engines; those with a diesel engines and those with vertical triple-expansion steam engines. Wasaga was of the latter design and was larger than her diesel-engined cousins. Wasaga was 180 feet (54.9 m) long overall, had a beam of 28 feet 6 inches (8.7 m) and a draught of 9 feet 9 inches (3.0 m). The minesweeper had a displacement of 672 long tons (683 t). She had a complement of 6 officers and 77 enlisted.

Wasaga had two vertical triple-expansion steam engines, each driving one shaft, using steam provided by two Admiralty three-drum boilers. The engines produced a total of 2,400 indicated horsepower (1,800 kW) and gave a maximum speed of 16.5 knots (30.6 km/h; 19.0 mph). The minesweeper could carry a maximum of 150 long tons (152 t) of fuel oil.

Wasaga was armed with a single quick-firing (QF) 4-inch (102 mm)/40 caliber Mk IV gun mounted forward. This was later replaced with a 12-pounder (3 in (76 mm)) 12 cwt HA gun. (Note: "Cwt" is the abbreviation for hundredweight, 20 cwt referring to the weight of the gun.) For anti-aircraft purposes, the minesweeper was equipped with one QF 2-pounder Mark VIII and two single-mounted QF 20 mm Oerlikon guns. The 2-pounder gun was later replaced with a powered twin 20 mm Oerlikon mount. As a convoy escort, Wasaga was deployed with 40 depth charges launched from two depth charge throwers and four chutes.

== Operational history ==
The minesweeper was ordered as part of the 1939–40 building programme. The ship's keel was laid down on 3 September 1940 by Burrard Dry Dock Co, Ltd. at their yard in Vancouver. Named for a town in Ontario, Wasaga was launched on 23 January 1941 and commissioned into the Royal Canadian Navy on 1 July 1941 at Vancouver.

The ship was sent to the East Coast of Canada following commissioning, arriving at Halifax, Nova Scotia on 10 September 1941. The minesweeper was sent to Bermuda for workups and upon returning to Halifax, was assigned to the local convoy escort and patrol unit, Halifax Force. In March 1942 Wasaga joined Newfoundland Force, the patrol and convoy escort force operating out of St. John's, Newfoundland.

In January 1944, Wasaga transferred to Sydney Force, the local escort and patrol force operating out of Sydney, Nova Scotia and remained with them for a month before sailing to Europe in February. Upon arrival at Plymouth in March, Wasaga was assigned to 32nd Minesweeping Flotilla for minesweeping duties associated with the invasion of Normandy. The minesweeper later transferred to the all-Canadian 31st Minesweeping Flotilla. During the invasion, Wasaga and her fellow minesweepers swept and marked channels through the German minefields leading into the invasion beaches in the American sector. The 31st Minesweeping Flotilla swept channel 3 on 6 June, completing the task unmolested by the Germans. Wasaga remained with the unit until 30 September 1944, when the minesweeper returned to Canada for a refit at Charlottetown, Prince Edward Island.

Wasaga returned to European waters on 4 February 1945 and rejoined the 31st Minesweeping Flotilla at Plymouth. On 11 April, the minesweeper was damaged in a collision and was forced to withdraw from Allied attacks in the Gironde estuary region. The 31st Minesweeping Flotilla spent the final months of the war sweeping the English Channel. Wasaga returned to Canada in September 1945 and was paid off at Halifax on 6 October 1945. The ship was laid up at Shelburne, Nova Scotia until sold to Marine Industries in 1946 and broken up for scrap in 1947 at Sorel, Quebec.
