= HMS Felixstowe =

Minesweeper of the Royal Navy

History

United Kingdom
- Name: HMS Felixstowe
- Builder: Lobnitz and Company, Renfrew, Scotland
- Laid down: 8 August 1940
- Launched: 15 January 1941
- Commissioned: 11 July 1941
- Fate: Sunk by a mine on 18 December 1943

General characteristics
- Class & type: Bangor-class minesweeper
- Displacement: 673 long tons (684 t) standard; 860 long tons (874 t) full
- Length: 189 ft (58 m) o/a
- Beam: 28 ft 6 in (8.69 m)
- Draught: 10 ft 6 in (3.20 m)
- Installed power: 2,400 ihp (1,800 kW); 2 × Admiralty 3-drum boilers
- Propulsion: 2 shafts; 2 vertical triple-expansion steam engines
- Speed: 16 knots (30 km/h; 18 mph)
- Range: 2,800 nmi (5,200 km; 3,200 mi) at 10 knots (19 km/h; 12 mph)
- Complement: 60
- Armament: 1 × single 12 pounder 3-inch (76 mm) anti-aircraft gun; 1 × single QF 2-pounder (4 cm) AA gun or; 1 × quadruple Vickers .50 machine gun

HMS Felixstowe was a Bangor-class minesweeper built for the Royal Navy during the Second World War.

== Design and description ==
The Bangor class was designed as a small minesweeper that could be easily built in large numbers by civilian shipyards; as steam turbines were difficult to manufacture, the ships were designed to accept a wide variety of engines. Felixstowe displaced 673 long tons (684 t) at standard load and 860 long tons (870 t) at deep load. The ship had an overall length of 189 feet (57.6 m), a beam of 28 feet 6 inches (8.7 m) and a draught of 10 feet 6 inches (3.2 m). The ship's complement consisted of 60 officers and ratings.

She was powered by two vertical triple-expansion steam engines (VTE), each driving one shaft, using steam provided by two Admiralty three-drum boilers. The engines produced a total of 2,400 shaft horsepower (1,800 kW) and gave a maximum speed of 16 knots (30 km/h; 18 mph). The ship carried a maximum of 160 long tons (163 t) of fuel oil that gave her a range of 2,800 nautical miles (5,200 km; 3,200 mi) at 10 knots (19 km/h; 12 mph).

The VTE-powered Bangors were armed with a 12 pounder 3-inch (76 mm) anti-aircraft gun and a single QF 2-pounder (4 cm) AA gun or a quadruple mount for the Vickers .50 machine gun. In some ships the 2-pounder was replaced a single or twin 20 mm Oerlikon AA gun, while most ships were fitted with four additional single Oerlikon mounts over the course of the war. For escort work, their minesweeping gear could be exchanged for around 40 depth charges.

== Construction and career ==
She was built by Lobnitz and Company, Renfrew, Scotland and launched on 22 July 1941. She served in the Mediterranean during the Second World War. Thus far she has been the only ship of the Royal Navy named after the Suffolk town of Felixstowe. She struck a mine on 18 December 1943 and sank east of Capo Ferro, Sardinia, Italy.

== Bibliography ==
- Chesneau, Roger, ed. (1980). Conway's All the World's Fighting Ships 1922–1946. Greenwich, UK: Conway Maritime Press. ISBN 0-85177-146-7.
- Colledge, J. J.; Warlow, Ben (2006) [1969]. Ships of the Royal Navy: The Complete Record of All Fighting Ships of the Royal Navy from the 15th Century to the Present (3rd Rev ed.). London: Chatham Publishing. ISBN 978-1-86176-281-8. OCLC 67375475.
- Lenton, H. T. (1998). British & Empire Warships of the Second World War. Annapolis, Maryland: Naval Institute Press. ISBN 1-55750-048-7.
