= HMCS Goderich =

Royal Canadian Navy minesweeper

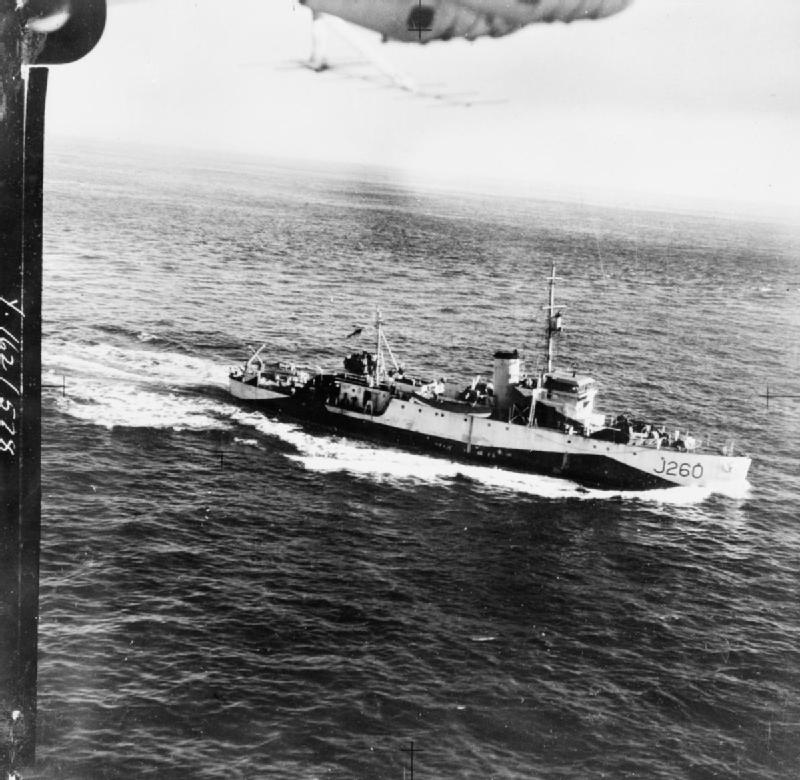
- HMCS Goderich underway

History

Canada
- Name: Goderich
- Namesake: Goderich, Ontario
- Builder: Dufferin Shipbuilding Co., Toronto
- Laid down: 15 January 1941
- Launched: 14 May 1941
- Commissioned: 23 November 1941
- Decommissioned: 6 November 1945
- Identification: Pennant number: J262
- Honours and awards: Atlantic 1942-45
- Fate: Sold for scrap 1959

General characteristics
- Class & type: Bangor-class minesweeper
- Displacement: 672 long tons (683 t)
- Length: 180 ft (54.9 m) oa
- Beam: 28 ft 6 in (8.7 m)
- Draught: 9 ft 9 in (3.0 m)
- Propulsion: 2 Admiralty 3-drum water tube boilers, 2 shafts, vertical triple-expansion reciprocating engines, 2,400 ihp (1,790 kW)
- Speed: 16.5 knots (31 km/h)
- Complement: 83
- Armament: 1 x QF 3-inch (76 mm) 20 cwt gun; 1 x QF 2 pdr Mark VIII; 2 × QF 20 mm Oerlikon guns; 40 depth charges as escort

HMCS Goderich (pennant J260) was a Bangor-class minesweeper constructed for the Royal Canadian Navy during the Second World War. Entering service in 1941, Goderich spent the entire war as a local convoy escort based out of Halifax, Nova Scotia. The vessel was decommissioned in 1945 and placed in reserve. Reacquired during the Korean War, the vessel was modernized but never re-entered service and was sold for scrap and broken up in 1959.

== Design and description ==
A British design, the Bangor-class minesweepers were smaller than the preceding Halcyon-class minesweepers in British service, but larger than the Fundy class in Canadian service. They came in two versions powered by different engines; those with a diesel engines and those with vertical triple-expansion steam engines. Goderich was of the latter design and was larger than her diesel-engined cousins. Goderich was 180 feet (54.9 m) long overall, had a beam of 28 feet 6 inches (8.7 m) and a draught of 9 feet 9 inches (3.0 m). The minesweeper had a displacement of 672 long tons (683 t). She had a complement of 6 officers and 77 enlisted.

Goderich had two vertical triple-expansion steam engines, each driving one shaft, using steam provided by two Admiralty three-drum boilers. The engines produced a total of 2,400 indicated horsepower (1,800 kW) and gave a maximum speed of 16.5 knots (30.6 km/h; 19.0 mph). The minesweeper could carry a maximum of 150 long tons (152 t) of fuel oil.

The minesweeper was armed with a single quick-firing (QF) 3-inch (76 mm) 20 cwt gun mounted forward. (Note: "Cwt" is the abbreviation for hundredweight, 20 cwt referring to the weight of the gun.) The ship was also fitted with a QF 2-pounder Mark VIII aft and were eventually fitted with single-mounted QF 20 mm Oerlikon guns on the bridge wings. Those ships assigned to convoy duty were armed with two depth charge launchers and four chutes to deploy their 40 depth charges. Goderich was equipped with SA and LL minesweeping gear for the detection of acoustic and magnetic naval mines.

== Operational history ==
The minesweeper was ordered as part of the 1940–41 building programme. The ship's keel was laid down on 15 January 1941 by Dufferin Shipbuilding in Toronto, Ontario. Named for the town in Ontario, Goderich was launched on 15 May 1941 and commissioned on 23 November 1941 at Toronto.

Goderich arrived at Halifax, Nova Scotia on 6 December 1941 and was a member of either the Halifax Local Defence Force or Halifax Force as a local convoy escort and patrol ship. On 18 November 1942, the minesweeper was damaged in a collision with the tanker Iocoma in Halifax harbour. On 29 January 1943, Goderich rescued survivors from the US tanker Brilliant that had broken in two during a storm. The minesweeper underwent one refit, from 5 March to 15 May 1943 at Liverpool, Nova Scotia.

Following the end of the war, the ship was paid off on 6 November 1945 at Halifax and placed in reserve at Sorel, Quebec. Goderich remained there until reacquired in 1951 during the Korean War. The minesweeper underwent modernization at Lauzon, Quebec. Goderich was given the new hull number FSE 198 and re-designated a coastal escort. However, the ship was never recommissioned and was laid up at Sydney, Nova Scotia until sold in February 1959 to Marine Industries to be broken up for scrap.
