= HMCS Chignecto (J160) =

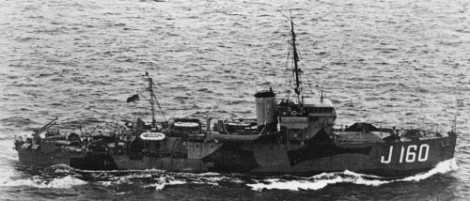

History

Canada
- Name: Chignecto
- Namesake: Chignecto Bay
- Ordered: 23 February 1940
- Builder: North Van Ship Repair, North Vancouver
- Laid down: 9 November 1940
- Launched: 12 December 1940
- Commissioned: 31 October 1941
- Decommissioned: 3 November 1945
- Identification: Pennant number:J160
- Fate: Sold to the Union Steamship Co. of British Columbia in 1946

General characteristics
- Class & type: Bangor-class minesweeper
- Displacement: 672 long tons (683 t)
- Length: 180 ft (54.9 m) oa
- Beam: 28 ft 6 in (8.7 m)
- Draught: 9 ft 9 in (3.0 m)
- Propulsion: 2 Admiralty 3-drum water tube boilers, 2 shafts, vertical triple-expansion reciprocating engines, 2,400 ihp (1,790 kW)
- Speed: 16.5 knots (31 km/h)
- Complement: 83
- Armament: 1 × 12-pounder (3 in (76 mm)) 12 cwt HA gun or 3 in (76 mm) 20 cwt HA gun; 1 × QF 2-pounder Mark VIII; 2 × QF 20 mm Oerlikon guns; 40 depth charges as escort

HMCS Chignecto was a Bangor-class minesweeper that served in the Royal Canadian Navy during the Second World War. She only saw service on the west coast of Canada during the war. She was named for Chignecto Bay. The vessel's fate is unknown.

== Design and description ==
A British design, the Bangor-class minesweepers were smaller than the preceding Halcyon-class minesweepers in British service, but larger than the Fundy class in Canadian service. They came in two versions powered by different engines; those with a diesel engines and those with vertical triple-expansion steam engines. Chignecto was of the latter design and was larger than her diesel-engined cousins. Chignecto was 180 feet (54.9 m) long overall, had a beam of 28 feet 6 inches (8.7 m) and a draught of 9 feet 9 inches (3.0 m). The minesweeper had a displacement of 672 long tons (683 t). She had a complement of 6 officers and 77 enlisted.

Chignecto had two vertical triple-expansion steam engines, each driving one shaft, using steam provided by two Admiralty three-drum boilers. The engines produced a total of 2,400 indicated horsepower (1,800 kW) and gave a maximum speed of 16.5 knots (30.6 km/h; 19.0 mph). The minesweeper could carry a maximum of 150 long tons (152 t) of fuel oil.

Chignecto was originally armed with a single quick-firing (QF) 4-inch (102 mm)/40 caliber Mk IV gun mounted forward that was later replaced with a 12-pounder (3 in (76 mm)) 12 cwt HA gun. (Note: "Cwt" is the abbreviation for hundredweight, 20 cwt referring to the weight of the gun. The 40 caliber denotes the length of the gun. This means that the length of the gun barrel is 40 times the bore diameter.) For anti-aircraft purposes, the minesweepers were equipped with one quick-firing (QF) 2-pounder Mark VIII and up to three single-mounted QF 20 mm Oerlikon guns. As a convoy escort, Chignecto was deployed with 40 depth charges launched from two depth charge throwers and four chutes.

== Service history ==
Chignecto was ordered 23 February 1940 as part of the 1939–1940 building programme. The minesweeper's keel was laid down on 9 November 1940 by North Van Ship Repair at North Vancouver and the ship was launched on 12 December later that year. She was commissioned into the Royal Canadian Navy on 31 October 1941.

Following her commissioning, Chignecto was assigned to Esquimalt Force for local patrol and minesweeping duties. She spent the entire war on the west coast alternating between service with Esquimalt Force and Prince Rupert Force. She was paid off from the Royal Canadian Navy on 3 November 1945. In 1946 Chignecto was sold to the Union Steamship Co. of British Columbia. She was to have been converted to a coastal merchant ship however the conversion was not proceeded with. The fate of the vessel is in dispute. The Miramar Ship Index claims the vessel was broken up in 1949. Macpherson and Barrie traced the ship to 1951 in a purchase order from a San Francisco firm. Colledge claims the ship was possibly resold in 1952. (Note: Uboat.net claims that Chignecto was broken up in 1957 at the Point Hope Shipyard, Victoria, British Columbia.)

== See also ==
- List of ships of the Canadian Navy
