= HMCS Ungava (J149) =

1940 Bangor-class minesweeper

History

Canada
- Name: Ungava
- Namesake: Ungava Bay
- Builder: North Van Ship Repair, North Vancouver
- Laid down: 24 April 1940
- Launched: 9 October 1940
- Commissioned: 5 September 1941
- Decommissioned: 3 April 1946
- Identification: Pennant number: J149
- Honours and awards: Atlantic 1941–44, Gulf of St. Lawrence 1944
- Fate: Scrapped 1947

General characteristics
- Class & type: Bangor-class minesweeper
- Displacement: 672 long tons (683 t)
- Length: 180 ft (54.9 m) oa
- Beam: 28 ft 6 in (8.7 m)
- Draught: 9 ft 9 in (3.0 m)
- Propulsion: 2 Admiralty 3-drum water tube boilers, 2 shafts, vertical triple-expansion reciprocating engines, 2,400 ihp (1,790 kW)
- Speed: 16.5 knots (31 km/h)
- Complement: 83
- Armament: 1 × QF 4 in (102 mm)/40 cal Mk IV gun; 1 × QF 2-pounder Mark VIII; 2 × QF 20 mm Oerlikon guns; 40 depth charges as escort

HMCS Ungava was a Bangor-class minesweeper that served in the Royal Canadian Navy during the Second World War. She saw action in the Battle of the Atlantic and the Battle of the St. Lawrence. Following the war she was scrapped. She was named for Ungava Bay.

== Design and description ==
A British design, the Bangor-class minesweepers were smaller than the preceding Halcyon-class minesweepers in British service, but larger than the Fundy class in Canadian service. They came in two versions powered by different engines; those with a diesel engines and those with vertical triple-expansion steam engines. Ungava was of the latter design and was larger than her diesel-engined cousins. Ungava was 180 feet (54.9 m) long overall, had a beam of 28 feet 6 inches (8.7 m) and a draught of 9 feet 9 inches (3.0 m). The minesweeper had a displacement of 672 long tons (683 t). She had a complement of 6 officers and 77 enlisted.

Ungava had two vertical triple-expansion steam engines, each driving one shaft, using steam provided by two Admiralty three-drum boilers. The engines produced a total of 2,400 indicated horsepower (1,800 kW) and gave a maximum speed of 16.5 knots (30.6 km/h; 19.0 mph). The minesweeper could carry a maximum of 150 long tons (152 t) of fuel oil.

Ungava was armed with a single quick-firing (QF) 4-inch (102 mm)/40 caliber Mk IV gun mounted forward. (Note: The 40 caliber denotes the length of the gun. This means that the length of the gun barrel is 40 times the bore diameter.) For anti-aircraft purposes, the minesweeper was equipped with one QF 2-pounder Mark VIII and two single-mounted QF 20 mm Oerlikon guns. As a convoy escort, Ungava was deployed with deployed with 40 depth charges launched from two depth charge throwers and four chutes.

== Service history ==
Ungava was ordered as part of the 1939–40 shipbuilding programme. The vessel's keel was laid down on 24 April 1940 by North Vancouver Ship Repairs Ltd. at North Vancouver and the minesweeper was launched on 9 October 1940. She was commissioned into the Royal Canadian Navy on 5 September 1941 at Vancouver.

After working up, Ungava was assigned to Halifax Force. She remained with the unit until May 1943 when she was ordered to join Gaspe Force, escorting convoys through the Saint Lawrence River. Later that year in December, she transferred back to Halifax Force and served with that unit for another five months. In May 1944 she transferred to Sydney Force, spending the rest of the year with that unit before returning to Halifax Force in February 1945.

Ungava served with the Halifax Force until April 1945, when she underwent a refit at Liverpool which lasted until May 1945. After returning from workups, she was used for miscellaneous duties along the eastern coast until being paid off on 3 April 1946. She was sold to T. Harris of Barber, New Jersey to be broken up in 1947.

== See also ==
- List of ships of the Canadian Navy
