= HMS Bridlington (J65) =

Minesweeper of the Royal Navy

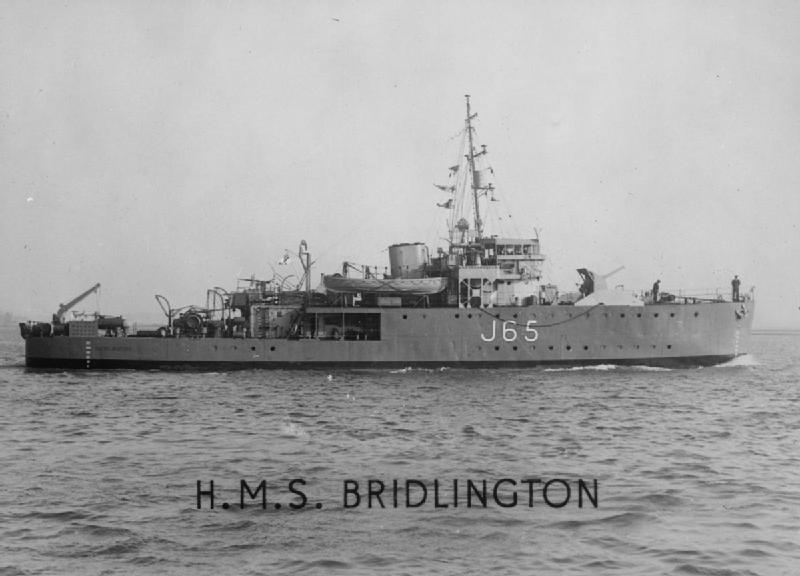
- HMS Bridlington

History

United Kingdom
- Name: HMS Bridlington
- Builder: William Denny and Brothers, Dumbarton
- Laid down: 11 September 1939
- Launched: 29 February 1940
- Commissioned: 28 September 1940
- Decommissioned: 1946
- Stricken: 1946
- Fate: Transferred to RAF, 1946

Royal Air Force
- Name: HMAFV Bridlington
- Operator: Royal Air Force Marine Branch
- Acquired: 1946
- Fate: Scrapped 6 May 1958

General characteristics (as built)
- Class & type: Bangor-class minesweeper
- Displacement: 605 long tons (615 t)
- Length: 174 ft (53.0 m) (o/a)
- Beam: 28 ft (8.5 m)
- Draught: 8 ft 3 in (2.5 m)
- Installed power: 2,000 bhp (1,500 kW)
- Propulsion: 2 shafts; diesel engine
- Speed: 16 knots (30 km/h; 18 mph)
- Complement: 60
- Armament: 1 × 12 pdr 3 in (76 mm) gun; 1 × quadruple 0.5 in (12.7 mm) Vickers machine gun

HMS Bridlington was a diesel-powered British Bangor-class minesweeper. She served in the Second World War in the Royal Navy, and in the Royal Air Force (RAF) from 1946-1958.

== Description ==
The Bangor-class ships were designed to be mass produced, requiring a minimum of resources and able to be built in small shipyards inexperienced with naval work. The diesel-powered ships had an overall length of 174 feet (53.0 m), a beam of 28 feet (8.5 m), and a draught of 8 feet 3 inches (2.5 m) at full load. They displaced 605 long tons (615 t) at (standard) and 770 long tons (780 t) at full load. The ships had a pair of nine-cylinder diesel engines that drove the two propeller shafts. The engines were designed to produce a total of 2,000 brake horsepower (1,500 kW) which was intended to give the ships a speed of 16 knots (30 km/h; 18 mph). Their crew consisted of 60 officers and ratings.

The armament of the Bangor-class ships consisted of a 12-pounder 3-inch (76 mm) gun mounted forward of the superstructure and a quadruple mount for 0.5 inches (12.7 mm) Vickers machine guns aft. They could carry 40 depth charges when serving as convoy escorts.

== Construction and career ==
HMS Bridlington was ordered on 6 July 1939 from William Denny and Brothers, and laid down at their Dumbarton shipyard on 11 September 1939. She was launched on 29 February 1940 and commissioned on 28 September. She was the first ship in the Royal Navy to carry that name. After working up, she joined the 9th Minesweeping Flotilla at Scapa Flow. She later served in the Dieppe Raid and the Normandy landings. After being transferred to reserve service in 1945, she was passed on to the RAF in 1946.

=== Royal Air Force ===
In October 1955, Bridlington sailed to Gan, in the Indian Ocean, to create a landing strip on the island. She sailed back to Plymouth in April 1956, where she was scrapped in 1958. Her nameplate and bell were salvaged, which can be seen on display at the Bridlington Harbor Heritage Museum in Bridlington.

== Bibliography ==
- Campbell, N. J. M. (1980). "Great Britain (including Empire Forces)". In Chesneau, Roger (ed.). Conway's All the World's Fighting Ships 1922–1946. Conway Maritime Press. pp. 2–85. ISBN 0-85177-146-7.
- Colledge, J. J.; Warlow, Ben & Bush, Steve (2020). Ships of the Royal Navy: The Complete Record of all Fighting Ships of the Royal Navy from the 15th Century to the Present (5th revised and updated ed.). Seaforth Publishing. ISBN 978-1-5267-9327-0.
- Lenton, H. T. (1998). British & Empire Warships of the Second World War. Naval Institute Press. ISBN 1-55750-048-7.
- Rohwer, Jürgen; Hümmelchen, Gerhard (1992). Chronology of the War at Sea 1939–1945. London: Greenhill Books. ISBN 1-85367-117-7.
