= HMS Bridport (J50) =

Minesweeper of the Royal Navy

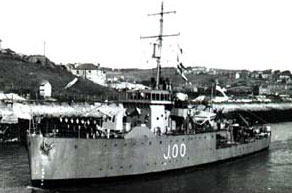
- HMS Bangor, sister ship of Bridport

History

United Kingdom
- Name: HMS Bridport
- Ordered: 6 July 1939
- Builder: Harland & Wolff, Govan
- Laid down: 11 September 1939
- Launched: 29 February 1940
- Commissioned: 28 November 1940
- Renamed: HMRAFV Bridport
- Fate: Scrapped, 1959

General characteristics (as built)
- Class & type: Bangor-class minesweeper
- Displacement: 605 long tons (615 t)
- Length: 174 ft (53.0 m) (o/a)
- Beam: 28 ft (8.5 m)
- Draught: 8 ft 3 in (2.5 m)
- Installed power: 2,000 bhp (1,500 kW)
- Propulsion: 2 shafts; diesel engine
- Speed: 16 knots (30 km/h; 18 mph)
- Complement: 60
- Armament: 1 × 12 pdr 3 in (76 mm) gun; 1 × quadruple 0.5 in (12.7 mm) Vickers machine gun

HMS Bridport was a diesel-powered Bangor-class minesweeper built for the Royal Navy during the Second World War. Completed in 1940, she participated in the Normandy landings and the Bombardment of Cherbourg in June 1944.

== Description ==
The Bangor-class ships were designed to be mass produced, requiring a minimum of resources and able to be built in small shipyards inexperienced with naval work. The diesel-powered ships had an overall length of 174 feet (53.0 m), a beam of 28 feet (8.5 m), and a draught of 8 feet 3 inches (2.5 m) at full load. They displaced 605 long tons (615 t) at (standard) and 770 long tons (780 t) at full load. The ships had a pair of nine-cylinder diesel engines that drove the two propeller shafts. The engines were designed to produce a total of 2,000 brake horsepower (1,500 kW) which was intended to give the ships a speed of 16 knots (30 km/h; 18 mph). Their crew consisted of 60 officers and ratings.

The armament of the Bangor-class ships consisted of a 12-pounder 3-inch (76 mm) gun mounted forward of the superstructure and a quadruple mount for 0.5 inches (12.7 mm) Vickers machine guns aft. They could carry 40 depth charges when serving as convoy escorts.

== Construction and career ==
HMS Bridport was ordered on 6 July 1939 from William Denny and Brothers, and laid down at their Dumbarton shipyard on 11 September 1939. She was launched on 29 February 1940 and commissioned on 28 November. She was the first ship in the Royal Navy to carry that name.

Bridport supported the Normandy landings in June 1944 and the Bombardment of Cherbourg on 25 June.

== Bibliography ==
- Campbell, N. J. M. (1980). "Great Britain (including Empire Forces)". In Chesneau, Roger (ed.). Conway's All the World's Fighting Ships 1922–1946. Conway Maritime Press. pp. 2–85. ISBN 0-85177-146-7.
- Colledge, J. J.; Warlow, Ben & Bush, Steve (2020). Ships of the Royal Navy: The Complete Record of all Fighting Ships of the Royal Navy from the 15th Century to the Present (5th revised and updated ed.). Seaforth Publishing. ISBN 978-1-5267-9327-0.
- Lenton, H. T. (1998). British & Empire Warships of the Second World War. Naval Institute Press. ISBN 1-55750-048-7.
