= HMS Ardrossan =

Minesweeper of the Royal Navy

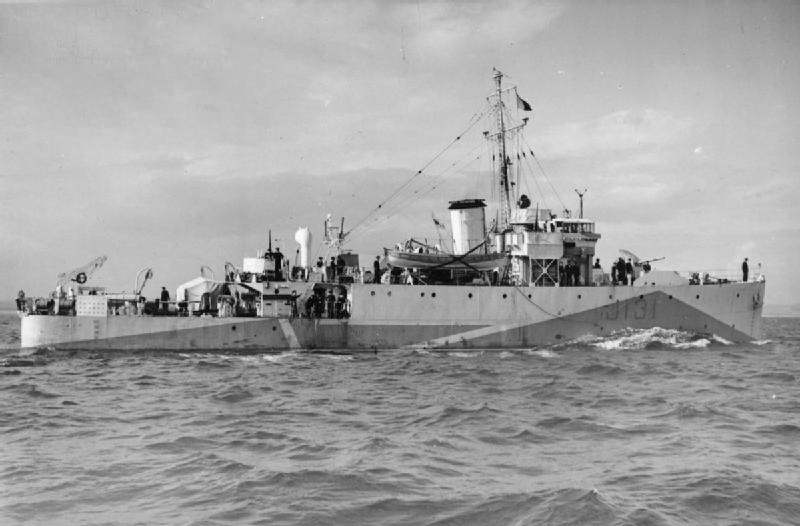

History

United Kingdom
- Name: Ardrossan
- Builder: Blyth Shipbuilding Company, Blyth, Northumberland
- Laid down: 6 September 1940
- Launched: 22 July 1941
- Commissioned: 21 May 1942
- Honours and awards: NORTH SEA 1942, NORMANDY 1944
- Fate: Sold for scrap, 1 January 1948

General characteristics
- Class & type: Bangor-class minesweeper
- Displacement: 656 long tons (667 t) (standard)
- Length: 174 ft (53 m) o/a
- Beam: 28 ft 6 in (8.7 m)
- Draught: 10 ft 3 in (3.1 m)
- Installed power: 2 × Admiralty 3-drum boilers; 2,000 ihp (1,500 kW)
- Propulsion: 2 shafts; 2 geared steam turbines
- Speed: 16 knots (30 km/h; 18 mph)
- Range: 2,800 nmi (5,200 km; 3,200 mi) at 10 knots (19 km/h; 12 mph)
- Complement: 60
- Armament: 1 × single 3-inch (76 mm) AA gun; 1 × single 2 pdr (4 cm) AA gun

HMS Ardrossan was a Bangor-class minesweeper built for the Royal Navy during the Second World War. Completed in 1942, she played a minor role in the war.

== Design and description ==
The Bangor class was designed as a small minesweeper that could be easily built in large numbers by civilian shipyards; as steam turbines were difficult to manufacture, the ships were designed to accept a wide variety of engines. Ardrossan displaced 656 long tons (667 t) at standard load and 820 long tons (830 t) at deep load. The ship had an overall length of 174 feet (53 m), a beam of 28 feet 6 inches (8.7 m) and a draught of 10 feet 3 inches (3.1 m). The ship's complement consisted of 60 officers and ratings.

She was powered by two Metrovick-Curtis geared steam turbines, each driving one shaft using steam provided by two Admiralty three-drum boilers. The engines produced a total of 2,000 shaft horsepower (1,500 kW) and gave a maximum speed of 16 knots (30 km/h; 18 mph). Ardrossan carried a maximum of 160 long tons (163 t) of fuel oil that gave her a range of 2,800 nautical miles (5,200 km; 3,200 mi) at 10 knots (19 km/h; 12 mph).

The turbine-powered Bangors were armed with a 3-inch (76 mm) anti-aircraft gun and a single QF 2-pounder (4 cm) AA gun. In some ships the 2-pounder was replaced a single or twin 20 mm Oerlikon AA gun, while most ships were fitted with four additional single Oerlikon mounts over the course of the war. For escort work, her minesweeping gear could be exchanged for around 40 depth charges.

== Construction and career ==
Ardrossan was ordered on 9 September 1939 and laid down on 6 September 1940 by the Blyth Shipbuilding Company, at their shipyard in Blyth, Northumberland. The ship was launched on 22 July 1941 and completed on 21 May 1942. She was sold on 1 January 1948 for scrap and arrived at the breaker's yard at Thornaby-on-Tees on 19 August.

== Bibliography ==
- Campbell, N. J. M. (1980). "Great Britain (including Empire Forces)". In Chesneau, Roger (ed.). Conway's All the World's Fighting Ships 1922–1946. Conway Maritime Press. pp. 2–85. ISBN 0-85177-146-7.
- Colledge, J. J.; Warlow, Ben & Bush, Steve (2020). Ships of the Royal Navy: The Complete Record of all Fighting Ships of the Royal Navy from the 15th Century to the Present (5th revised and updated ed.). Seaforth Publishing. ISBN 978-1-5267-9327-0.
- Lenton, H. T. (1998). British & Empire Warships of the Second World War. Annapolis, Maryland: Naval Institute Press. ISBN 1-55750-048-7.
- Warlow, Ben, Lt. Cdr., Royal Navy (2004) Battle Honours of the Royal Navy, Maritime Books: Liskeard, UK ISBN 1-904459-05-6
