= HMCS Canso =

History

United Kingdom
- Name: Canso
- Builder: North Vancouver Ship Repairs, North Vancouver
- Laid down: 30 December 1940
- Launched: 9 June 1941
- Identification: pennant J21
- Fate: Loaned to Royal Canadian Navy 1942

Canada
- Name: Canso
- Namesake: Canso, Nova Scotia
- Commissioned: 5 March 1942
- Decommissioned: 24 September 1945
- Honours and awards: Normandy 1944, Atlantic 1944
- Fate: returned to Royal Navy 1945, broken up 1948

General characteristics
- Class & type: Bangor-class minesweeper
- Displacement: 672 long tons (683 t)
- Length: 180 ft (54.9 m) oa
- Beam: 28 ft 6 in (8.7 m)
- Draught: 9 ft 9 in (3.0 m)
- Propulsion: 2 Admiralty 3-drum water tube boilers, 2 shafts, vertical triple-expansion reciprocating engines, 2,400 ihp (1,790 kW)
- Speed: 16.5 knots (31 km/h)
- Complement: 83
- Armament: 1 × 12-pounder (3 in (76 mm)) 12 cwt HA gun; 2 × QF 20 mm Oerlikon guns; 40 depth charges as escort

HMCS Canso (pennant J21) was a Bangor-class minesweeper initially constructed for the Royal Navy during the Second World War. Transferred to the Royal Canadian Navy in 1942, the minesweeper saw service on both the West and East Coasts of Canada as a convoy escort and patrol vessel. The vessel participated in the invasion of Normandy and spent the final years of the war in European waters. Canso was returned to the Royal Navy following the war and was broken up for scrap in 1948.

== Design and description ==
A British design, the Bangor-class minesweepers were smaller than the preceding Halcyon-class minesweepers in British service, but larger than the Fundy class in Canadian service. They came in two versions powered by different engines; those with a diesel engines and those with vertical triple-expansion steam engines. Canso was of the latter design and was larger than her diesel-engined cousins. Canso was 180 feet (54.9 m) long overall, had a beam of 28 feet 6 inches (8.7 m) and a draught of 9 feet 9 inches (3.0 m). The minesweeper had a displacement of 672 long tons (683 t). She had a complement of 6 officers and 77 enlisted.

Canso had two vertical triple-expansion steam engines, each driving one shaft, using steam provided by two Admiralty three-drum boilers. The engines produced a total of 2,400 indicated horsepower (1,800 kW) and gave a maximum speed of 16.5 knots (30.6 km/h; 19.0 mph). The minesweeper could carry a maximum of 150 long tons (152 t) of fuel oil.

British Bangor-class minesweepers were armed with a single 12-pounder (3 in (76 mm)) 12 cwt HA gun mounted forward. (Note: "Cwt" is the abbreviation for hundredweight, 20 cwt referring to the weight of the gun.) For anti-aircraft purposes, the minesweepers were equipped with one QF 2-pounder Mark VIII and two single-mounted QF 20 mm Oerlikon guns. The 2-pounder gun was later replaced with a twin 20 mm Oerlikon mount. As a convoy escort, Canso was deployed with 40 depth charges launched from two depth charge throwers and four chutes.

== Operational history ==
The minesweeper was ordered as part of the British 1940 construction programme. The ship's keel was laid down on 30 December 1940 by North Vancouver Ship Repairs at their yard in North Vancouver, British Columbia. Named for a community in Nova Scotia, Canso was launched on 9 June 1941. Transferred to the Royal Canadian Navy, the ship was commissioned on 5 March 1942 at Vancouver.

Following work ups, the minesweeper joined Esquimalt Force in May 1942, the local patrol and convoy escort force operating out of Esquimalt, British Columbia. Canso was one of the warships added to the west coast patrol force after the Japanese attack on Pearl Harbor. The main duty of Bangor-class minesweepers after commissioning on the West Coast was to perform the Western Patrol. This consisted of patrolling the west coast of Vancouver Island, inspecting inlets and sounds and past the Scott Islands to Gordon Channel at the entrance to the Queen Charlotte Strait and back.

In July 1943, Canso was transferred to the Atlantic Coast, arriving on 19 August at Halifax, Nova Scotia and joined Halifax Force upon arrival, the local patrol and escort force. She remained with the unit until February 1944 when the minesweeper was sent to European waters as part of Canada's contribution to the invasion of Normandy. After arriving at Plymouth on 7 March, Canso was assigned during the lead-up to the invasion to the 32nd and 16th Minesweeping Flotillas. Canso was with the 16th Minesweeping Flotilla on D-day was assigned to the assault sweep during the landings on 6 June. The 16th Minesweeping Flotilla was detailed with clearing channel 1 in the American sector. The minesweepers completed their work unmolested by the Germans ashore. Their work completed, the minesweeper returned to Plymouth, sailing for the invasion zone again the next day. The 16th Minesweeping Flotilla spent the following weeks sweeping the invasion zone and the sea lanes to it. On 16 June they swept a channel in front of the cruiser HMS Arethusa, which was carrying King George VI to Normandy.

In August 1944, the minesweeper sailed for Canada to undergo a refit at Saint John, New Brunswick. Following the refit, Canso returned to European waters. She joined the 31st Minesweeping Flotilla upon her return and took part in the last large-scale combined operation in the European theatre in an attack on German naval bases in France that had been left untouched by Allied war effort to that point. Departing Plymouth on 12 April 1945, the 31st Minesweeping Flotilla began operations in the mouth of the Gironde estuary on 14 April. They completed their duties on 16 April, unmolested by the Germans. While returning to Plymouth, the flotilla encountered a German trawler and captured it. Canso and the 31st Minesweeping Flotilla spent the next five months sweeping the English Channel.

The minesweeper was paid off on 24 September 1945 and returned to the Royal Navy. Canso was taken to Sheerness and laid up, never entering service with the Royal Navy. On 1 January 1948, the vessel was sold to Young to be broken up at Sunderland.
