= Bangor-class minesweeper =

Class of warships used in the Second World War

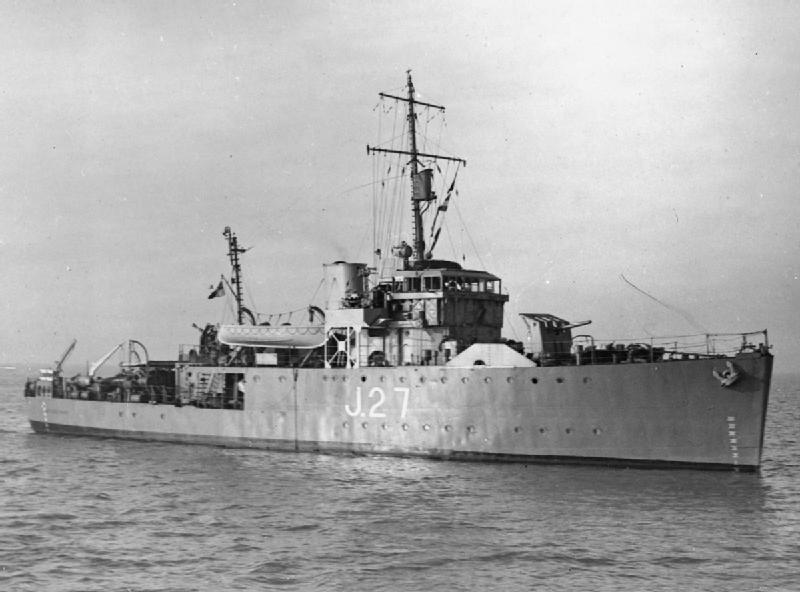
- HMS Blackpool, a Bangor-class minesweeper

Class overview
- Builders: Multiple builders
- Operators: Royal Navy; Royal Canadian Navy; Royal Indian Navy; Imperial Japanese Navy
- Preceded by: Halcyon class
- Succeeded by: Algerine class
- In commission: 7 November 1940 –
- Completed: Bangor 14; Blyth 19; Ardrossan 26

General characteristics Bangor (Diesel)
- Displacement: 605 tons (RN); 592 tons (RCN)
- Length: 162 ft (49.4 m)
- Beam: 28 ft (8.5 m)
- Draught: 8 ft 3 in (2.51 m)
- Propulsion: 2 shafts, 9-cylinder diesel, 2,000 bhp (1,500 kW)
- Speed: 16 knots (30 km/h)
- Complement: 60
- Armament: (RN specs): 1 × QF 12-pounder 3 in (76.2 mm) gun; 1 × quadruple 0.5 in (12.7 mm) Vickers machine gun Mark III; (RCN specs): 1 × QF 4 in (101.6 mm) gun; 1 × 2-pounder Mark VIII; 2 × twin .303 (7.7 mm) machine guns

General characteristics Blyth (Reciprocating)
- Displacement: 673 tons
- Length: 171 ft 6 in (52.3 m)
- Beam: 28 ft 6 in (8.7 m)
- Draught: 8 ft 3 in (2.5 m)
- Propulsion: 2 Admiralty 3-drum water tube boilers, 2 shafts, vertical triple-expansion reciprocating engines, 2,400 ihp (1,790 kW)
- Speed: 16 knots (30 km/h)
- Complement: 60 (RN); 70 (RCN); 87 (RIN)
- Armament: (RN specs): 1 × QF 12-pounder 3 in (76.2 mm) gun; 1 × quadruple 0.5 in (12.7 mm) Vickers machine gun / single QF 2-pounder Mark VIII; (RCN specs): 1 × QF 4 in (101.6 mm) gun; 1 × QF 2-pounder Mark VIII; 2 × twin .303 (7.7 mm) machine guns; (RIN specs): 1 × QF 12-pounder 3 in (76.2 mm) gun; 3 × single Oerlikon 20 mm guns

General characteristics Ardrossan (Turbine)
- Displacement: 656 tons
- Length: 174 ft (53.0 m)
- Beam: 28 ft 6 in (8.7 m)
- Draught: 8 ft 3 in (2.5 m)
- Propulsion: 2 Admiralty 3-drum water tube boilers, 2 shafts coupled to steam turbines, 2,000 shp (1,500 kW)
- Speed: 16 knots (30 km/h)
- Complement: 60 (RN); 87 (RIN)
- Armament: (RN specs): 1 × QF 12-pounder 3 in (76.2 mm) gun; 1 × quadruple 0.5 in (12.7 mm) Vickers machine gun / single QF 2-pounder Mark VIII; (RIN specs): 1 × QF 12-pounder 3 in (76.2 mm) gun; 3 × single Oerlikon 20 mm guns

The Bangor-class minesweepers were a class of warships operated by the Royal Navy (RN), Royal Canadian Navy (RCN), Imperial Japanese Navy (IJN), and Royal Indian Navy (RIN) during and after the Second World War. Some were later operated by the navies of Norway, Pakistan, Egypt, Portugal, Greece and Turkey, and several civilian operators.

The class derives its name from the lead ship, HMS Bangor, which was launched on 19 February 1940 and commissioned on 7 November of that year. Royal Navy ships were named after coastal towns of the United Kingdom.

Their lack of size gave vessels of the class poor sea handling abilities, reportedly worse even than the Flower-class corvettes. The diesel-engined versions were considered to have poorer handling characteristics than the slow-speed reciprocating-engined variants. Their shallow draught made them unstable and their short hulls tended to bury the bow when operating in a head sea.

The Bangor-class vessels were also considered overcrowded, cramming six officers and over 90 ratings into a vessel originally intended for a total of 40.

== Design and development ==
The original intent of the Bangor-class minesweeper design was to provide a coastal equivalent of the Halcyon-class minesweeper; the realities brought to light by the start of the war caused a modification of the design before construction started. The need for quick construction coupled with the lack of engineering resources resulted in several variations existing based on the availability of propulsion machinery. The ships all had twin screws but the machinery was a mix of steam turbine, slow-speed steam reciprocating, high-speed steam reciprocating and diesel. The diesel powered examples were about 20 ft (6.1 m) shorter than the rest as they had no need for boiler rooms. Displacement varied with propulsion machinery from 590 to 672 tons. The reciprocating engine powered Bangors were also known as the Blyth class and the steam turbine powered versions as the Ardrossan class. The class was considered cramped for the purposes it was built for, with not enough room provided for the acoustic and magnetic minesweeping gear carried.

== Ships in class ==
=== Diesel-engined ===
Royal Navy
Ship	Pennant no.	Builder	Laid down	Launched	Commissioned	Paid off	Fate
Bangor	J00	Harland & Wolff, Belfast	19 Sep 1939	23 May 1940	7 Nov 1940	1945	Sold to Norway as Glomma in 1946, stricken in 1961
Blackpool	J27	Harland & Wolff, Belfast	19 Sep 1940	4 Jul 1940	3 Feb 1941	1945	Sold to Norway as Tarna in 1946, stricken in 1961
Bridlington	J65	William Denny and Brothers, Dumbarton	11 Sep 1939	29 Feb 1940	28 Sep 1940		Transferred to the Royal Air Force (RAF) in 1946. Sold for scrap at Plymouth on 6 May 1958.
Bridport	J50	William Denny and Brothers	11 Sep 1939	29 Feb 1940	28 Nov 1940	1945	Sold in 1946, scrapped at Plymouth on 6 May 1948

Royal Canadian Navy
Ship	Original pennant no.	Builder	Laid down	Launched	Commissioned	Paid off	Fate
Brockville	J270	Marine Industries Limited, Sorel	9 Dec 1940	20 Jun 1941	19 Sep 1942	28 Aug 1945	Transferred to the RCMP as the patrol vessel MacLeod in 1945. Transferred back to the RCN in 1951 and decommissioned in 1958. Sold to J.A.L. Steamships, Wallaceburg in 1961 and scrapped.
Digby	J267	Davie Shipbuilding, Lauzon	20 Mar 1941	5 Jun 1942	26 Jul 1942	31 Jul 1945	Transferred to the RCMP as the patrol vessel Perry in 1945. Transferred back to the RCN in 1953 and decommissioned in 1958.
Esquimalt	J272	Marine Industries Limited; Sorel, Quebec	20 Dec 1940	8 Aug 1941	26 Oct 1942	16 Apr 1945	Torpedoed and sunk on 16 Apr 1945 by U-190 5 nautical miles (9 km) off Chebucto Head at 44°28′N 63°10′W. 44 crew lost, 26 survived.
Granby	J264	Davie Shipbuilding, Lauzon	17 Dec 1940	6 Sep 1941	2 May 1942	31 Jul 1945	Recommissioned by the RCN in 1953 and decommissioned in 1966
Lachine	J266	Davie Shipbuilding, Lauzon	27 Dec 1940	14 Jun 1941	20 Jun 1942	31 Jul 1945	Rebuilt as a rescue ship in 1945, transferred to the RCMP as the patrol vessel Starnes in 1950. Sold as the mercantile vessel Jack's Bay in 1952.
Melville	J263	Davie Shipbuilding, Lauzon	17 Dec 1940	6 Jul 1941	4 Dec 1941	18 Aug 1945	Transferred to the RCMP as the patrol vessel Cygnus in 1945. Scrapped in 1961.
Noranda	J265	Davie Shipbuilding, Lauzon	27 Dec 1940	13 Jun 1941	15 May 1942	28 Aug 1945	Transferred to the RCMP as the patrol vessel Irvine in 1945. Sold in 1962 and became the yacht Miranda. Foundered in Montego Bay in 1972 and was scrapped.
Transcona	J271	Marine Industries Limited; Sorel, Quebec	18 Dec 1940	26 Apr 1941	25 Nov 1942	31 Jul 1945	Transferred to the RCMP as the patrol vessel French in 1945. Scrapped in 1961.
Trois Rivières	J269	Davie Shipbuilding, Lauzon	9 Dec 1940	30 Jun 1941	8 Dec 1942	31 Jul 1945	Transferred to the RCMP as the patrol vessel MacBrien in 1945. Scrapped in 1959.
Truro	J268	Davie Shipbuilding, Lauzon	20 Mar 1941	5 Jun 1942	27 Aug 1942	31 Jul 1945	Transferred to the RCMP as the patrol vessel Herchmer in 1945. Sold as the mercantile vessel Gulf Mariner; scrapped in 1964.

=== Turbine-engined ===
Royal Navy
Ship	Pennant no.	Builder	Laid Down	Launched	Commissioned	Paid Off	Fate
Ardrossan	J131	Blyth Shipbuilding, Blyth	6 Sep 1940	22 Jul 1941	21 May 1942		Sold on 1 Jan 1948 and scrapped at Thornaby on 29 Aug 1948
Beaumaris	J07	Ailsa Shipbuilding Company, Troon	31 Dec 1939	31 Oct 1940	28 Aug 1941		Sold on 1 Jan 1948 and scrapped at Milford Haven
Bootle	J143	Ailsa Shipbuilding Company, Troon	31 Aug 1940	23 Oct 1941	3 Apr 1942		Sold on 1 Jan 1948 and scrapped at Charlestown, Fife in June 1949
Boston	J14	Ailsa Shipbuilding Company, Troon	27 Nov 1939	30 Dec 1940	26 Jan 1942		Sold on 1 Jan 1948 and scrapped at Charlestown, Fife in June 1949
Brixham	J105	Blyth Shipbuilding; Blyth, Northumberland	6 Nov 1940	21 Oct 1941	19 Aug 1942		Scrapped on 7 Jul 1948 at Dunston
Clacton	J151	Ailsa Shipbuilding Company, Troon	12 Nov 1940	19 Dec 1941	4 Jun 1942	31 Dec 1943	Struck a mine and sank east of Corsica on 31 Dec 1943. Three officers and 29 crew died.
Cromarty	J09	Blyth Shipbuilding; Blyth, Northumberland	12 Jun 1940	24 Feb 1941	13 Dec 1941	23 Oct 1943	Struck a mine and sank in Strait of Bonifacio on 23 Oct 1943
Dornoch	J173	Ailsa Shipbuilding Company, Troon	13 Jan 1941	4 Feb 1942	22 Jul 1942		Sold on 1 Jan 1948. Scrapped at Thornaby.
Dunbar	J53	Blyth Shipbuilding; Blyth, Northumberland	21 Jun 1940	5 Jun 1941	3 Mar 1942		Sold on 1 Jan 1948. Scrapped at Southampton.
Greenock	J182	Blyth Shipbuilding; Blyth, Northumberland	28 Jul 1941	11 May 1942			Never served in the Royal Navy. She was transferred to the Royal Indian Navy before completion to become Baluchistan.
Hartlepool	J155	Blyth Shipbuilding; Blyth, Northumberland	28 Oct 1941	14 Jul 1942			Never served in the Royal Navy. She was transferred to the Royal Indian Navy before completion to become Kathiawar.
Harwich	J190	William Hamilton and Company, Port Glasgow	10 Dec 1940	17 Feb 1942			Never served in the Royal Navy. She was transferred to the Royal Indian Navy before completion to become Khyber.
Hythe	J194	Ailsa Shipbuilding Company, Troon	20 Jul 1940	4 Sep 1941	5 Mar 1942	11 Oct 1943	Torpedoed and sunk by U-371 at 01:09 on 11 Oct 1943 off Bougie, Algeria at 37°04′N 05°00′E.
Ilfracombe	J95	William Hamilton and Company, Port Glasgow	11 Oct 1939	29 Jan 1941	20 Aug 1941		Sold on 1 Jan 1948. Scrapped at Dunston.
Llandudno	J67	William Hamilton and Company, Port Glasgow	20 Oct 1939	8 Nov 1941	29 Mar 1942		Sold in 1947 as the mercantile ship Rorvik. Scrapped in 1952.
Lyme Regis	J193	Lobnitz & Co.	9 Sep 1941	19 Mar 1942	5 Jun 1942		Scrapped at Sunderland on 24 Aug 1948.
Middlesbrough	J164	William Hamilton and Company	12 Dec 1940	2 May 1942			Never served in the Royal Navy. She was transferred to the Royal Indian Navy before completion to become Kumaon.
Newhaven	J199	William Hamilton and Company, Port Glasgow	28 Mar 1941	29 Jul 1942			Never served in the Royal Navy. She was transferred to the Royal Indian Navy before completion to become Carnatic.
Padstow	J180	William Hamilton and Company, Port Glasgow	29 Aug 1941	29 Oct 1942			Never served in the Royal Navy. She was transferred to the Royal Indian Navy before completion to become Rohilkand.
Polruan	J97	Ailsa Shipbuilding Company, Troon	6 Nov 1939	18 Jul 1940	9 May 1940		Scrapped at Sunderland in June 1950
Poole	J147	Alexander Stephen and Sons	25 Jul 1940	25 Jun 1941	8 Nov 1941		Sold on 1 Jan 1948. Scrapped at Pembroke Dock.
Rothesay	J19	William Hamilton and Company, Port Glasgow	29 Sep 1939	18 Mar 1941	3 Jul 1941		Sold on 19 Apr 1950. Scrapped at Milford Haven.
Rye	J76	Ailsa Shipbuilding Company, Troon	27 Nov 1939	19 Aug 1940	20 Nov 1941		Sold on 24 Aug 1948. Scrapped at Purfleet in September 1948.
Tenby	J34	William Hamilton and Company, Port Glasgow	29 Sep 1939	10 Sep 1941	8 Dec 1941		Sold on 1 Jan 1948. Scrapped at Dunston.
Whitehaven	J121	Philip and Son, Dartmouth, Devon	24 Jul 1940	29 May 1941	14 Nov 1941		Sold on 14 Aug 1948. Scrapped at Briton Ferry.
Worthing	J72	Philip and Son; Dartmouth, Devon	15 Nov 1940	22 Aug 1941	20 Mar 1942		Sold on 7 Jul 1948. Scrapped at Dunston.

Royal Indian Navy
Ship	Original pennant no.	Builder	Laid down	Launched	Commissioned	Paid off	Fate
Baluchistan	J182	Blyth Shipbuilding, Blyth	28 Jul 1941	11 May 1942	28 Oct 1942		Formerly Greenock, She was transferred to the RIN before completion. She was sold to Pakistan in 1947. Scrapped on 22 Jan 1959.
Carnatic	J199	William Hamilton and Company, Port Glasgow	28 Mar 1941	29 Jul 1942	27 Oct 1942		Formerly Newhaven, She was transferred to the RIN before completion. Scrapped in 1949.
Kathiawar	J155	Blyth Shipbuilding, Blyth, Northumberland	28 Oct 1941	14 Jul 1942	23 Dec 1942		Formerly Hartlepool, she was transferred to RIN before completion. She was sold to Pakistan in 1947 as Chittagong. Scrapped in 1956.
Khyber	J190	William Hamilton and Company, Port Glasgow	10 Dec 1940	17 Feb 1942	12 Aug 1942		Formerly Harwich, she was transferred to the RIN before completion. Scrapped in 1949.
Kumaon	J164	William Hamilton and Company, Port Glasgow	12 Dec 1940	2 May 1942	30 Nov 1942		Formerly Middlesbrough, she was transferred to the RIN before completion. Scrapped in 1949.
Rohilkand	J180	William Hamilton and Company, Port Glasgow	29 Aug 1941	29 Oct 1942	5 Feb 1943		Formerly Padstow, she was transferred to the RIN before completion. Scrapped in 1961.

=== Reciprocating-engined ===
Royal Navy
Ship	Pennant no.	Builder	Laid down	Launched	Commissioned	Paid off	Fate
Bayfield	J08	North Vancouver Ship Repairs, North Vancouver	30 Dec 1940	26 May 1941			She was transferred to the Royal Canadian Navy before completion to become Bayfield
Blyth	J15	Blyth Shipbuilding, Blyth	11 Jan 1940	2 Sep 1940	17 Jun 1941		Sold on 25 May 1948 as the mercantile ship Radbourne; her conversion was never completed; she was scrapped
Bude	J116	Lobnitz and Company, Renfrew	2 Apr 1940	4 Sep 1940	12 Feb 1941		Sold to Egypt in 1946 as Nasr
Canso	J21	North Vancouver Ship Repairs; North Vancouver, British Columbia	30 Dec 1940	2 Jun 1941			She was transferred to the Royal Canadian Navy upon completion to become Canso
Clydebank	J200	Lobnitz and Company, Renfrew	15 May 1941	20 Nov 1941			She was transferred to the Royal Indian Navy before completion to become Orissa
Caraquet	J38	North Vancouver Ship Repairs; North Vancouver, British Columbia	31 Jan 1941	2 Jun 1941			She was transferred to the Royal Canadian Navy upon completion to become Caraquet. Sold in 1946 to Portugal as NRP Almirante Lacerda (A525). Sold in 1975.
Cromer	J128	Lobnitz and Company, Renfrew	16 May 1940	7 Oct 1940	4 Apr 1941	9 Nov 1942	She struck a mine and sank on 9 Nov 1942 off Marsa Matruh, Egypt at 31-26N, 27-16E
Eastbourne	J127	Lobnitz and Company, Renfrew	29 Jun 1940	5 Nov 1940	26 May 1941		She was sold on 28 Sep 1948 and scrapped at Dunston in Oct 1948
Felixstowe	J126	Lobnitz and Company, Renfrew	8 Aug 1940	15 Jan 1941	11 Jul 1941	18 Dec 1943	She struck a mine and sank on 18 Dec 1943 off Capo Ferro, Sardinia at 41-10N, 09-40E
Fort York	J119	Dufferin Shipbuilding, Toronto	26 Feb 1941	24 Aug 1941	27 Feb 1942		Sold to Portugal on 26 Sep 1950 as NRP Comandante Almeida Carvalho (A527), in 1964 renamed NRP Cacheu (F470)
Fraserburgh	J124	Lobnitz and Company, Renfrew	8 Aug 1940	12 May 1941	23 Sep 1941		She was sold on 1 Jan 1948, scrapped at Thornaby on 3 Jan 1948.
Guysborough	J52	North Vancouver Ship Repairs; North Vancouver, British Columbia	28 May 1941	21 Jul 1941			Transferred to the Royal Canadian Navy upon completion to become Guysborough
Ingonish	J69	North Vancouver Ship Repairs; North Vancouver, British Columbia	6 Jun 1941	30 Jul 1941	2 Jul 1945		Transferred to Royal Canadian Navy upon completion to become Ingonish. Returned to the Royal Navy on 2 Jul 1945. Sold on 1 Jan 1948.
Lantau	J208	Hong Kong and Whampoa Dock, Hong Kong	22 Jul 1941				Laid down as Beaulieu, renamed HMS Lantau in September 1941 while under construction. Captured on the stocks by the Japanese at the Fall of Hong Kong. Completed by the Japanese as the mercantile Gyosei Maru in 1942, renamed Shima Maru in 1943.
Lockeport	J100	North Vancouver Ship Repairs; North Vancouver, British Columbia	17 Jun 1941	22 Aug 1941	2 Jul 1945		Transferred to the Royal Canadian Navy upon completion to become Lockeport. Returned to the Royal Navy on 2 Jul 1945. Sold 1 Jan 1948.
Lyemun	J209	Hong Kong and Whampoa Dock, Hong Kong	22 Jul 1941				Laid down as Looe, renamed HMS Lyemun in September 1941 while under construction. Captured on the stocks by the Japanese at the Fall of Hong Kong. Completed by the Japanese as the Imperial Japanese Navy gunboat Nanyo, sunk by American aircraft in the Formosa Strait 23 Dec 1943.
Lyme Regis	J197	Lobnitz and Company	21 Jun 1941	31 Dec 1941			Transferred to Royal Indian Navy before completion to become Rajputana
Parrsborough	J117	Dufferin Shipbuilding, Toronto	19 Mar 1941	26 Jun 1941	27 May 1942		Sold on 1 Jan 1948
Peterhead	J59	Blyth Shipbuilding; Blyth, Northumberland	15 Feb 1940	31 Oct 1940	11 Sep 1941		Struck a mine off Normandy on 8 Jun 1944 during Operation Neptune. Declared a constructive total loss, salvaged and sold on 1 Jan 1948. Scrapped at Pembroke in May 1948.
Qualicum	J138	Dufferin Shipbuilding, Toronto	8 Apr 1941	3 Sep 1941	13 May 1942		Sold on 9 Feb 1948
Rhyl	J36	Lobnitz and Company, Renfrew	23 Nov 1939	21 Jun 1940	9 Nov 1940		Sold on 28 Sep 1948. Scrapped at Gateshead in Oct 1948.
Romney	J77	Lobnitz and Company, Renfrew	27 Feb 1940	3 Aug 1940	12 Dec 1940		Sold on 18 Jan 1950. Scrapped at Granton in February 1950.
Seaham	J123	Lobnitz and Company, Renfrew	15 Oct 1940	16 Jun 1941	19 Dec 1941		Transferred to Fishery Protection Service in 1946. Sold to Burma on 11 Aug 1947 as a pilot and survey vessel Chinthe. Sunk in 1948 by an uncharted Japanese mine.
Shippigan	J212	Dufferin Shipbuilding, Toronto	19 Apr 1941	12 Aug 1941	17 Jun 1942		Sold on 1 Jan 1948
Sidmouth	J47	Henry Robb, Leith	11 Jun 1940	15 Mar 1941	4 Aug 1941		Sold on 18 Jan 1950. Scrapped at Charlestown, Fife.
Stornoway	J31	Henry Robb, Leith	17 Jul 1940	10 Jun 1941	17 Nov 1941		Sold to Egypt on 11 Sep 1946 as Matruh.
Tadoussac	J220	Dufferin Shipbuilding, Toronto	17 Apr 1941	2 Aug 1941	28 Mar 1942		Sold on 18 Oct 1946 as a mercantile ship
Taitam	J210	Taikoo Dockyard, Hong Kong	12 Jul 1941				Laid down as Portland, was renamed HMS Taitam in September 1941 while under construction. Captured on the stocks by the Japanese at the Fall of Hong Kong when 60% complete. Launched 20 Feb 1943. Completed and Commissioned by the Japanese as Imperial Japanese Navy minesweeper No. 101 at Hong Kong 10 Apr 1944, sunk by American aircraft off Cape Padaran on 12 Jan 1945.
Tilbury	J228	Lobnitz and Company, Renfrew	15 Aug 1941	18 Feb 1942			Transferred to the Royal Indian Navy before completion to become Konkan.
Waglan	J211	Taikoo Dockyard, Hong Kong	12 Jul 1941				Laid down as Seaford, was renamed HMS Waglan in September 1941 while under construction. Captured on the stocks by the Japanese at the Fall of Hong Kong when only 30% complete. Launched 20 Mar 1943. Completed and Commissioned by the Japanese as Imperial Japanese Navy minesweeper No. 102 at Hong Kong 28 Sep 1944, damaged by American aircraft off Keelung on 3 Feb 1945. Used by Allied Minesweeping Service beginning 1 Dec 1945, Returned to Royal Navy 20 Nov 1947. Scrapped in Tokyo 31 Mar 1948.
Wedgeport	J139	Dufferin Shipbuilding, Toronto	29 Apr 1941	2 Aug 1941	21 Apr 1942		Sold on 11 Sep 1946 to Egypt as Sollum. Lost on 7 Apr 1953 in heavy weather off Alexandria.

Royal Canadian Navy
Ship	Original pennant no.	Builder	Laid down	Launched	Commissioned	Paid off	Fate
Bayfield	J08	North Vancouver Ship Repairs, North Vancouver, British Columbia	30 Dec 1940	26 May 1941	26 Feb 1942	24 Feb 1945	Formerly Bayfield, transferred to the RCN upon completion. Scrapped in Jan 1948 at Gateshead.
Bellechasse	J170	Burrard Dry Dock, North Vancouver	16 Apr 1941	20 Oct 1941	13 Dec 1941	23 Oct 1945	Sold in 1946
Blairmore	J314	Port Arthur Shipbuilding Company, Port Arthur, Ontario	2 Jan 1942	14 May 1942	17 Nov 1942	16 Oct 1945	Decommissioned 16 Oct 1945; Placed in strategic reserve 1946; Reacquired by the RCN July 1951 with new hull number FSE 193 as coastal escort; Transferred Turkish Navy 29 Mar 1958 & renamed Beycoz; Discarded & broken up 1971.
Burlington	J250	Dufferin Shipbuilding, Toronto, Ontario	4 Jul 1940	23 Nov 1941	6 Sep 1941	23 Oct 1945	Sold in 1946
Canso	J21	North Vancouver Ship Repairs, North Vancouver	30 Dec 1940	9 Jun 1941	6 Mar 1942	24 Sep 1945	Formerly Canso, transferred to RCN upon completion. Sold in January 1948.
Caraquet	J38	North Vancouver Ship Repairs; North Vancouver, British Columbia	31 Jan 1941	2 Jun 1941	2 Apr 1942	26 Sep 1945	Formerly Caraquet, transferred to the RCN upon completion. Sold in 1946 to Portugal as NRP Almirante Lacerda (A525). Sold in 1975.
Chedabucto	J168	Burrard Dry Dock; North Vancouver, British Columbia	24 Jan 1941	14 Apr 1941	27 Sep 1941	31 Oct 1943	Sank after colliding with the cable vessel Lord Kelvin in the St. Lawrence River at 48-14N, 69-16W.
Chignecto	J160	North Vancouver Ship Repairs; North Vancouver, British Columbia	9 Nov 1940	12 Dec 1940	31 Oct 1941	3 Nov 1945	Scrapped in 1957
Clayoquot	J174	Prince Rupert Dry Dock and Shipyards, Prince Rupert, British Columbia	20 Jun 1940	3 Oct 1940	22 Aug 1941	24 Dec 1944	Torpedoed at 44°25′N 63°20′W off the approaches to Halifax while escorting convoy XB-139 by U-806 at 14:37 on 24 Dec 1944. Eight crew members died.
Courtenay	J262	Prince Rupert Dry Dock and Shipyards; Prince Rupert, British Columbia	28 Jan 1941	2 Aug 1941	21 Mar 1942	5 Nov 1945	Scrapped on 3 Apr 1946
Cowichan	J146	North Vancouver Ship Repairs; North Vancouver, British Columbia	24 Apr 1940	8 Sep 1940	7 Apr 1941	10 Sep 1945	Sold in 1946 to Greece as Cowichan. Sold in 1956.
Drummondville	J146	Canadian Vickers, Montreal, Quebec	1 Oct 1940	21 May 1941	30 Oct 1941		Decommissioned on 29 Oct 1945. Recommissioned 1949 with pennant J181.
Fort William	J311	Port Arthur Shipbuilding Company; Port Arthur, Ontario	18 Aug 1941	30 Dec 1941	25 Aug 1942	23 Oct 1945	Sold in 1957 to Turkey as Bodrum. Sold in 1971.
Gananoque	J259	Dufferin Shipbuilding, Toronto	15 Jan 1941	23 Apr 1941	8 Nov 1941		Decommissioned on 13 Oct 1945. Recommissioned in 1949 with pennant J184. Sold in February 1959.
Georgian	J144	Dufferin Shipbuilding, Toronto	10 Oct 1940	28 Jan 1941	23 Sep 1941	23 Oct 1945	Sold in February 1959
Goderich	J260	Dufferin Shipbuilding, Toronto	15 Jan 1941	14 May 1941	23 Nov 1941		Decommissioned on 6 Nov 1945. Recommissioned in 1949 with pennant J198. Sold in February 1959.
Grandmere	J258	Canadian Vickers, Montreal	2 Jun 1941	21 Aug 1941	11 Dec 1941	23 Oct 1945	Sold in 1947 as the mercantile Elda
Guysborough	J52	North Vancouver Ship Repairs; North Vancouver, British Columbia	28 May 1941	21 Jul 1941	22 Apr 1942	17 Mar 1945	Formerly Guysborough, transferred to the RCN upon completion. Torpedoed at 46°43′N 09°30′W off the Bay of Biscay while escorting a convoy by U-868 at 18:50 on 17 Mar 1945. 51 crew members died.
Ingonish	J69	North Vancouver Ship Repairs; North Vancouver, British Columbia	6 Jun 1941	30 Jul 1941	5 Aug 1942	2 Jul 1945	Formerly Ingonish, transferred to the RCN upon completion. Returned to the RN on 2 Jul 1945.
Kelowna	J261	Prince Rupert Dry Dock and Shipyards; Prince Rupert, British Columbia	27 Dec 1940	28 May 1941	5 Feb 1942	22 Oct 1945	Sold in 1946 as the mercantile Condor. Resold in 1950 as the mercantile Hung Shin.
Kenora	J281	Port Arthur Shipbuilding Company; Port Arthur, Ontario	18 Aug 1941	20 Dec 1941	6 Aug 1942		Decommissioned on 6 Oct 1945. Recommissioned in 1949 with pennant J191. Decommissioned in 1957 and sold to Turkey as Bandirma. Sold in 1972.
Kentville	J312	Port Arthur Shipbuilding Company; Port Arthur, Ontario	15 Dec 1941	17 Apr 1942	10 Oct 1942		Decommissioned on 28 Oct 1945. Recommissioned in 1949 with pennant J182. Decommissioned in 1957 and sold to Turkey as Bartin. Sold in 1972.
Lockeport	J312	North Vancouver Ship Repairs; North Vancouver, British Columbia	17 Jun 1941	22 Aug 1941	27 May 1942	2 Jul 1945	Formerly Lockeport, transferred to the RCN upon completion. Returned to the RN on 2 Jul 1945.
Mahone	J159	North Vancouver Ship Repair; North Vancouver, British Columbia	13 Aug 1940	14 Nov 1940	29 Sept 1941	6 Nov 1945	Decommissioned 6 Nov 1945; Placed in strategic reserve 1946; Reacquired by the RCN & given the new hull number FSE 192 as coastal escort; Transferred to Turkish Navy 29 Mar 1958 as Beylerbeyi; Discarded & broken up 1972; Registry closed 1979.
Malpeque	J148	North Vancouver Ship Repairs; North Vancouver, British Columbia	24 Apr 1940	5 Sep 1940	8 Apr 1941		Decommissioned on 9 Oct 1945. Recommissioned in 1949 with pennant J186. Sold in February 1959.
Medicine Hat	J256	Canadian Vickers; Montreal, Quebec	1 Jan 1941	25 Jun 1941	4 Dec 1941		Decommissioned on 6 Nov 1945. Recommissioned in 1949 with pennant J197. Decommissioned in 1957 and sold to Turkey as Biga. Sold in 1963.
Milltown	J317	Port Arthur Shipbuilding Company; Port Arthur, Ontario	18 Aug 1941	27 Jan 1942	18 Sep 1942		Decommissioned on 18 Oct 1945. Recommissioned in 1949 with pennant J194. Sold in February 1959.
Minas	J165	Burrard Dry Dock; Vancouver, British Columbia	18 Oct 1940	22 Jan 1941	2 Aug 1941		Decommissioned on 6 Oct 1945. Recommissioned in 1949 with pennant J189. Scrapped in August 1959.
Miramichi	J169	Burrard Dry Dock; Vancouver, British Columbia	3 Nov 1940	2 Sep 1941	26 Nov 1941	24 Oct 1945	
Mulgrave	J313	Port Arthur Shipbuilding Company; Port Arthur, Ontario	15 Dec 1941	2 May 1942	4 Nov 1942	6 Jul 1945	Struck a mine in the English Channel off Le Havre on 8 Oct 1944 and badly damaged, not repaired. Scrapped in May 1947.
Nipigon	J154	Dufferin Shipbuilding; Toronto, Ontario	4 Jul 1940	1 Oct 1940	8 Nov 1941		Decommissioned on 13 Oct 1945. Recommissioned in 1949 with pennant J188. Decommissioned in 1957 and sold to Turkey as Bafra. Sold in 1972.
Outarde	J161	North Vancouver Ship Repairs; North Vancouver, British Columbia	15 Oct 1940	27 Jan 1941	4 Dec 1941	24 Nov 1945	Sold into mercantile service in 1946
Port Hope	J280	Davie Shipbuilding, Lauzon	9 Sep 1941	14 Dec 1941	30 Jul 1942		Decommissioned 13 Oct 1945. Recommissioned in 1949 with pennant J183. Sold in February 1959.
Quatsino	J152	Prince Rupert Dry Dock and Shipyards; Prince Rupert, British Columbia	20 Jun 1940	1 Sep 1941	3 Nov 1941	26 Nov 1945	Sold in 1946 to China as Chen Hsin
Quinte	J166	Burrard Dry Dock; Vancouver, British Columbia	14 Dec 1940	3 Aug 1941	30 Aug 1941	25 Oct 1946	Scrapped in August 1947
Red Deer	J255	Canadian Vickers; Montreal, Quebec	1 Jan 1941	5 Oct 1941	24 Nov 1941		Decommissioned on 30 Oct 1945. Recommissioned in 1949 with pennant J196. Sold in February 1959.
Sarnia	J309	Davie Shipbuilding; Lauzon, Quebec	18 Sep 1941	21 Jan 1942	13 Aug 1942	28 Oct 1945	Decommissioned 28 Oct 1945; Reacquired by RCN 1951 with pennant number 190; Transferred to Turkey 29 Mar 1958 as Büyükdere; Decommissioned, registry deleted & broken-up 1972.
Stratford	J310	Davie Shipbuilding; Lauzon, Quebec	29 Oct 1941	14 Feb 1942	29 Aug 1942	1 Apr 1946	Sold in 1947.
Swift Current	J254	Canadian Vickers; Montreal, Quebec	10 Jan 1941	29 May 1941	11 Nov 1941	23 Oct 1945	Decommissioned 23 Oct 1945; Placed in strategic reserve 1946; Reacquired by RCN 1951 with new hull number FSE 185 as coastal escort; Sold to Turkish Navy 29 Mar 1958 as Bozcaada; Discarded & scrapped 1971.
Thunder	J156	Canadian Vickers; Montreal, Quebec	4 Dec 1940	19 Mar 1941	14 Oct 1941	4 Oct 1945	
Ungava	J149	North Vancouver Ship Repairs; North Vancouver, British Columbia	24 Apr 1940	9 Oct 1940	9 May 1941	3 Apr 1946	
Vegreville	J257	Canadian Vickers; Montreal, Quebec	2 Jun 1941	7 Oct 1941	10 Dec 1941	6 Jun 1945	Scrapped in 1947
Wasaga	J162	Burrard Dry Dock; Vancouver, British Columbia	3 Sep 1940	23 Jan 1941	30 Jun 1941	6 Oct 1945	Scrapped 3 Apr 1946
Westmount	J318	Davie Shipbuilding; Lauzon, Quebec	28 Oct 1941	14 Mar 1942	15 Sep 1942	23 Oct 1945	Decommissioned 13 Oct 1945; Placed in strategic reserve 1946; Reacquired by RCN 1951 with new hull number FSE 187 as coastal escort; Transferred Turkish Navy 29 Mar 1958 as Bor Nova; Discarded & broken-up 1972.

Royal Indian Navy
Ship	Original pennant no.	Builder	Laid down	Launched	Commissioned	Paid off	Fate
Bihar	J247	Garden Reach Shipbuilders & Engineers, Kolkata	7 Jun 1941	7 Jul 1942	27 Feb 1944		Scrapped in 1949
Deccan	J129	Garden Reach Shipbuilders & Engineers, Kolkata		24 Apr 1944			Sold in 1949 as the mercantile Kennery
Konkan	J228	Lobnitz and Company, Renfrew	15 Aug 1941	18 Feb 1942	12 Jun 1942		Formerly Tilbury, transferred to the RIN before completion. Sold in 1949; scrapped in 1963.
Malwa	J55	Garden Reach Shipbuilders & Engineers, Kolkata		21 Jun 1944			Transferred in 1948 to Pakistan as Peshawar. Sold on 22 Jan 1959.
Orissa	J200	Lobnitz and Company, Renfrew	15 May 1941	20 Nov 1941	14 May 1942		Formerly Clydebank, transferred to the RIN before completion. Scrapped in 1949.
Oudh	J245	Garden Reach Shipbuilders & Engineers, Kolkata		3 Mar 1942			Transferred in 1948 to Pakistan as Dacca. Sold on 22 Jan 1959.
Rajputana	J197	Lobnitz and Company, Renfrew	21 Jun 1941	31 Dec 1941	30 Apr 1942		Formerly Lyme Regis, transferred to the RIN before completion. Scrapped in 1961.

== See also ==
- List of ship classes of World War II

== References and notes ==
- Warships of World War II, by H. T. Lenton & J. J. Colledge, pub. Ian Allan Ltd.
