= North Van Ship Repair =

Shipyard in Vancouver, British Columbia, Canada

Coordinates: 49.3076°N 123.0768°W

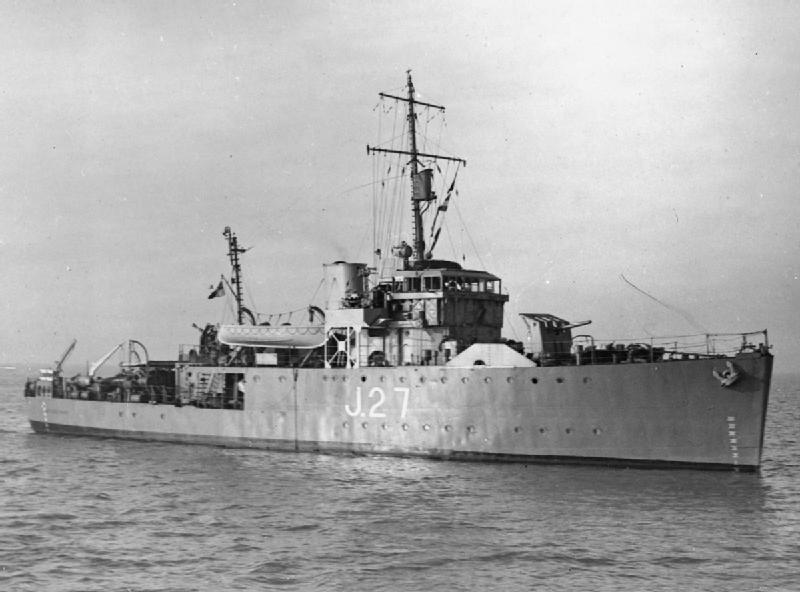
HMS Blackpool, a Bangor-class minesweeper

SS Brentwood Bay Park tanker ship in Victoria Canada in 1945

North Van Ship Repair, later known as Pacific Dry Dock, was a shipyard in the city of North Vancouver, British Columbia, Canada which built many of the Bangor-class minesweeper, Fort ships and Victory ships for Britain and Canada during World War II. Founded in 1931 by Arthur Burdick, it was located just west of Lonsdale Avenue adjoining the Burrard Dry Dock. In 1939, they built three launch ways and began building minesweepers, later expanding to allow the construction of cargo ships. In 1951 it was sold to its next-door neighbor, Burrard Dry Dock, and absorbed. The site was pulled down in the early 1980s and became the Lonsdale Quay and the Insurance Corporation of British Columbia (ICBC) building.
