= List of ships of the Royal Indian Navy =

The following is the list of ships of the Royal Indian Navy, in existence from 1934 to 1950, when it was renamed the Indian Navy. Several of the vessels listed below were transferred to the Royal Pakistani Navy in 1947. Vessels are organized by type.

For a more complete list of ships of the Indian Navy since its inception, see List of ships of the Indian Navy.

== Cruisers ==
- INS Delhi (C74)
- INS Mysore (C60)

== Destroyers ==
- INS Rajput (D141)
- INS Ranjit (D209)
- INS Rana (D115)

== Frigates ==
- HMIS Tir (K256)
- HMIS Tamar (K262)
- HMIS Neza (K239)
- HMIS Shamsher
- HMIS Dhanush (K265)
- HMIS Kukri (K243)
- HMIS Hooghly (K330)

== Corvettes ==
- HMIS Assam (K306)
- HMIS Gondwana (K348)
- HMIS Mahratta (K395)
- HMIS Sind (K274)

== Sloops ==
- HMIS Baluchi (PC.55)
- HMIS Cauvery (U10)
- HMIS Clive (L79)
- HMIS Cornwallis (L09)
- HMIS Elphinstone
- HMIS Godavari (U52)
- HMIS Hindustan (L80)
- HMIS Indus (U67)
- HMIS Jumna (U21)
- HMIS Kistna (U46)
- HMIS Lawrence (L83)
- HMIS Narbada (U40)
- HMIS Pathan (K26)
- HMIS Sutlej (U95)

== Minesweepers ==
- HMIS Baluchistan (J182)
- HMIS Bengal (J243)
- HMIS Bihar (J247)
- HMIS Bombay (J249)
- HMIS Carnatic (J199)
- HMIS Deccan (J129)
- HMIS Kathiawar (J155)
- HMIS Khyber (J190)
- HMIS Konkan (J228)
- HMIS Kumaon (J164)
- HMIS Madras (J237)
- HMIS Malwa (J55)
- HMIS Orissa (J200)
- HMIS Oudh (J245)
- HMIS Rajputana (J197)
- HMIS Rohilkhand (J180)

== Amphibious warfare ships ==
- HMIS El Hind (F120)

== Harbour Tankers ==
- HMIS Chilka

== Auxiliary Patrol Vessels ==
- HMIS Jamnagar
