= History of the Indian Navy =

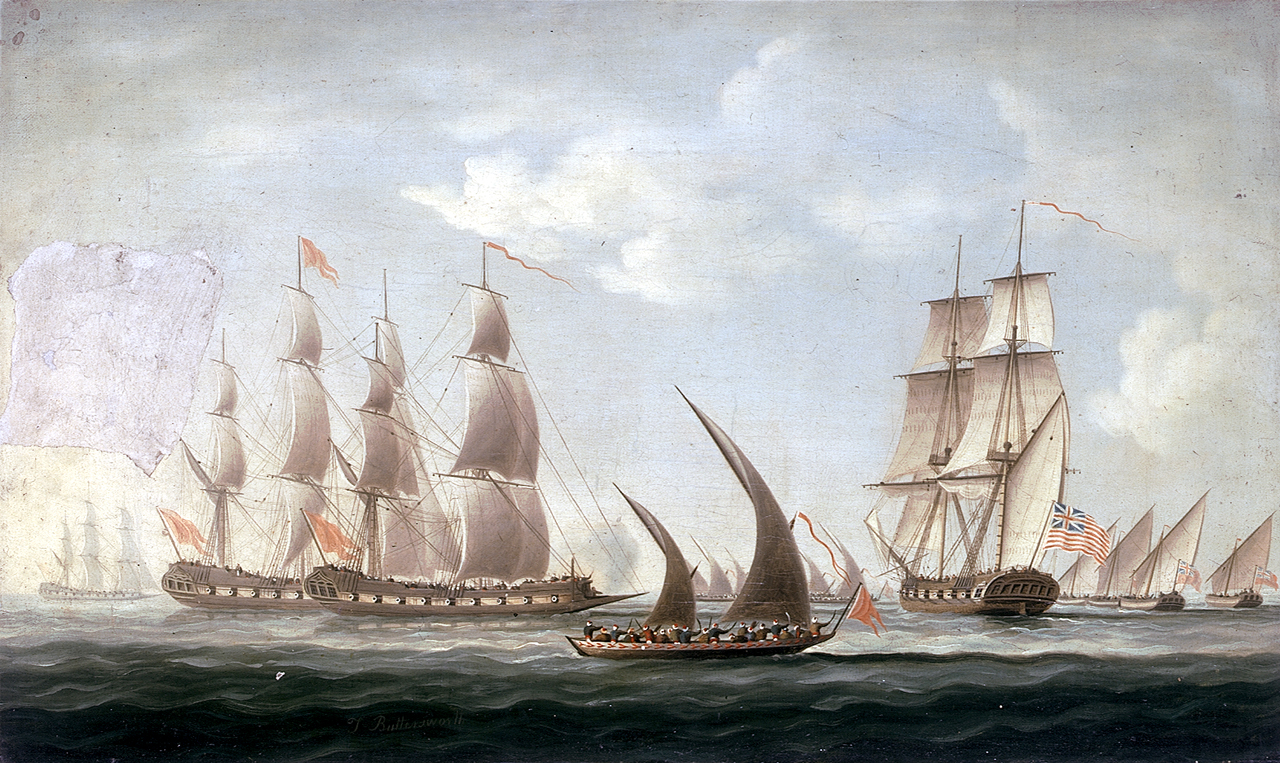
"Mahrmatta pirates attacking the sloop 'Aurora', of the Bombay Marine, 1812; beginning of the action." This painting by Thomas Buttersworth depicts Maratha Navy ships engaging in combat with the HCS Aurora.

Maritime powers in the Indian subcontinent have possessed navies for many centuries. Indian dynasties such as the Chola Empire used naval power to extend their influence overseas, particularly to Southeast Asia. The Marakkar Navy under Zamorins during 15th century and the Maratha Navy of the Maratha Confederacy during the 19th and 18th centuries fought with rival Indian powers and European powers. The East India Company organised its own private navy, which came to be known as the Bombay Marine. With the establishment of the British Raj after the Indian Rebellion of 1857, the small navy was transformed into "His Majesty's Indian Navy", then "Her Majesty's Indian Marine", and finally the "Royal Indian Marine".

The Royal Indian Marine transported large numbers of Indian troops overseas during the First World War, and – as the Royal Indian Navy – took part in naval combat and patrol duties during the Second World War. When India became independent in 1947 part of the Royal Indian Navy was allotted to the new state of Pakistan; the remaining forces took the title of Indian Navy in 1950. The Indian Navy took part in Operation Vijay in 1961, wars with Pakistan in 1965 and 1971, and in more recent operations of a smaller scale.

== Early history ==
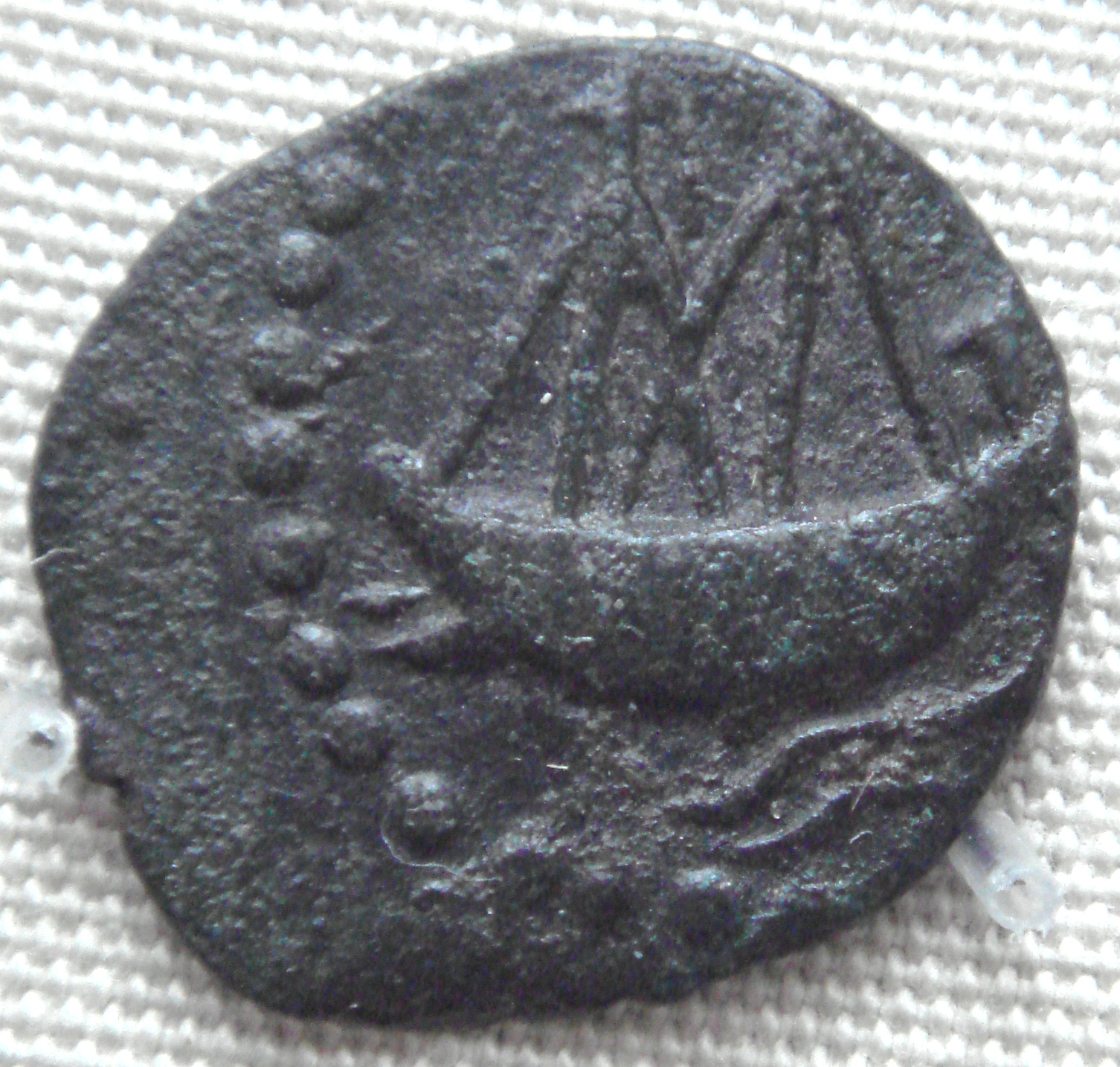
Ancient Indian ship on lead coin of Vasisthiputra Sri Pulamavi, testimony to the naval, seafaring and trading capabilities of the Sātavāhana Empire, during the 1st–2nd century CE.

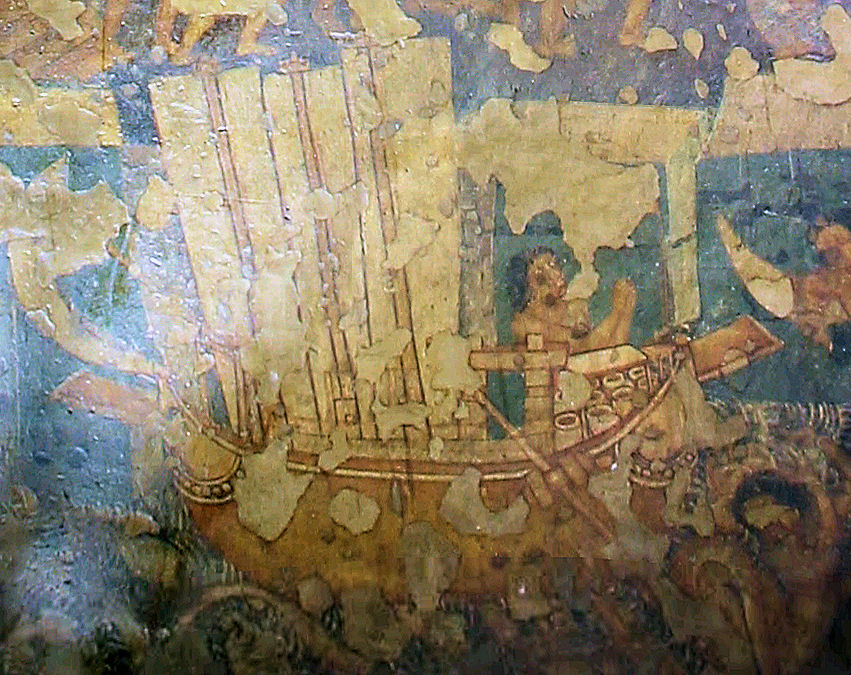
Painted depiction of a three-masted sailship, c. 5th century from Ajanta Caves.

India has a rich maritime history dating back 5,000 years. The world's first tidal dock may have been built at Lothal around 2300 BCE during the Indus Valley Civilization, near the present day Mangrol harbour on the Gujarat coast. The Rig Veda composed in the 2nd millennium BCE, credits Varuna with knowledge of the ocean routes and describes naval expeditions. A model of a bronze miniature ship with an open deck has been excavated from Pandu Rajar Dhibi from West Bengal dating about 1500-500 BCE.

Kautilya (c. 4th century BCE) in his Arthashastra mentions the protection of the empire's shipping and destruction of those threatening it. Although navy is not elaborately mentioned as one of the principle arms of Indian military in the Arthashastra, Megasthenes mentions it. Megasthenes mentions military command consisting of six boards of five members each, (i) Navy (ii) Military transport (iii) Infantry (iv) Cavalry (v) Chariot divisions and (vi) War elephants. During Mauryan empire, Indians had already made trading connections in South east Asia from Thailand and Malaysia peninsula to Cambodia and southern Vietnam. Mauryan period seals and inscriptions has been discovered at the ancient port cities of Thailand and Southern Vietnam. Sea lanes between India and neighbouring lands were the usual form of trade for many centuries, and are responsible for the widespread influence of Indian culture on other societies, particularly in the Indian Ocean region. Powerful navies included those of the Kalinga kingdom, Maurya, Satavahana, Chola, Vijayanagara, Maratha and Mughal empires. The Cholas excelled in foreign trade and maritime activity, extending their influence overseas to Southeast Asia and China.

=== Early literary evidences ===
The Indian shipping and maritime trade activity have been referenced in Arthashastra. Kautilya mentions the superintendent of ships as an officer which was supposed to look after the ports and shipping and security of maritime traders. Four categories of ships have been named, Commercial (Potavanika), Private (Svanaya), Royal (Rajanau) and warship (Himsrika). Commercial ships are further divided into Merchant ships (Samyati) and passenger ship (Pravahana).

=== Gupta Empire Navy ===
The five arms of the Gupta military included infantry, cavalry, chariot, elephants and ships. Gunaighar copper plate inscription of Vainya Gupta mentions ships but not chariots. Ships had become integral part of Indian military in the 6th century AD.

== Middle Ages ==
=== Chola expeditions ===
Map of the Chola Empire in 1030 under Rajendra I.

The Chola Empire initiated their grand naval conquests during the reign of two of its most illustrious monarchs, Raja Raja Chola (ruled 985–1014) and his son Rajendra Chola (ruled 1012–1044). Under Rajendra Chola, the Cholas expanded their empire with the use of their strong navy and subdued many kingdoms of South-East Asia and occupied the region which included Myanmar, Malaya, Sumatra etc., and sent ambassadors to countries as far off as China.

=== Kozhikode ===
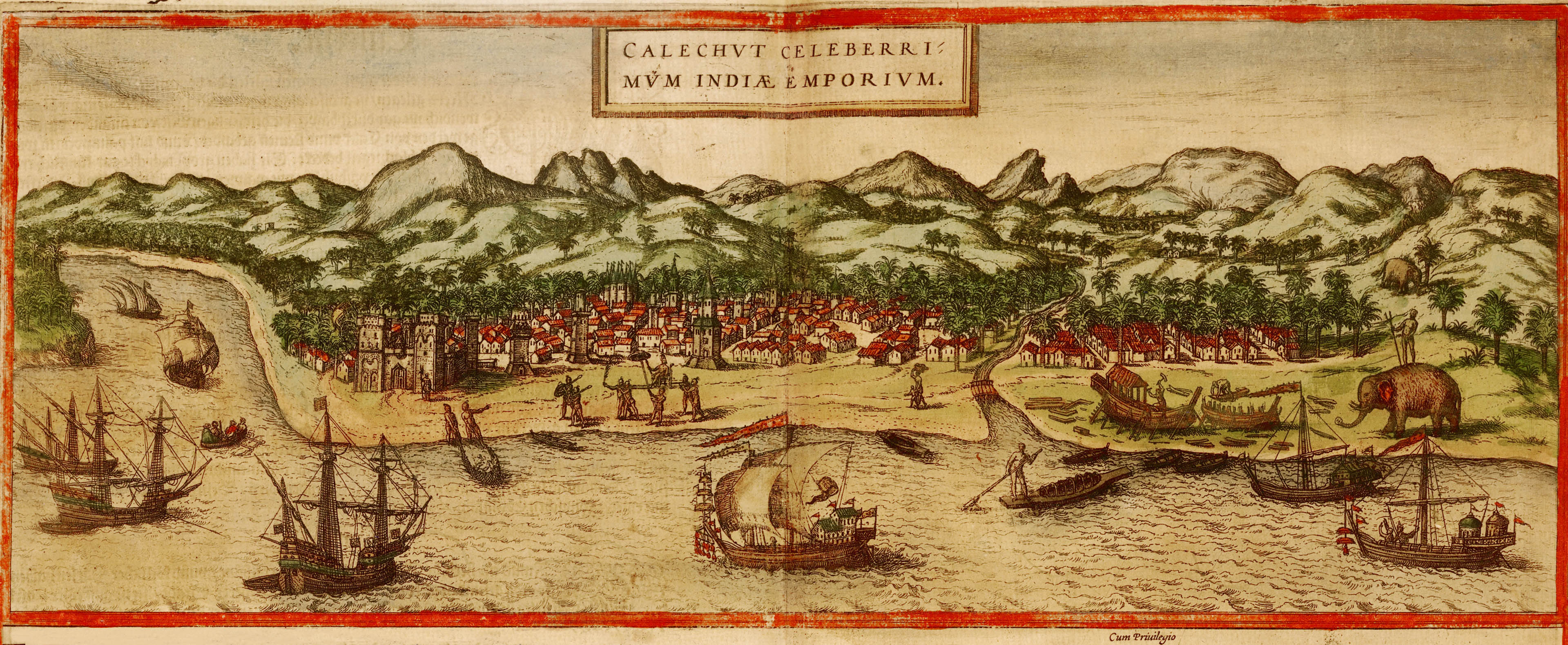
A panorama of Calicut, on the Malabar coast, shows several types of ships, shipbuilding, net fishing, dinghy traffic and a rugged, sparsely populated interior.

Manavikraman, Samoothiri Raja of Kozhikode began the naval build-up in 1503 in response to Portuguese attempts at extracting trading privileges. He commanded and appointed Kunjali as Marakkar (admiral) of his fleet.

Over the course of the next century, the Samoothiri Rajas successfully repelled various attempts by the Portuguese to overthrow their rule, with each side enlisting various allies over time. Four generations of Kunjali Marakkars served the Samoothiri Rajas. However, over time, the differences between Mohammed Ali, Marakkar IV, and his masters increased, culminating with his self-declaration as the "Lord of the Indian seas". The Samoothiris then collaborated with the Portuguese to defeat Mohammed Ali in 1600. Later, they allied with the Dutch East India Company to defeat the Portuguese.

== Early Modern Age ==
=== Mughal Navy ===
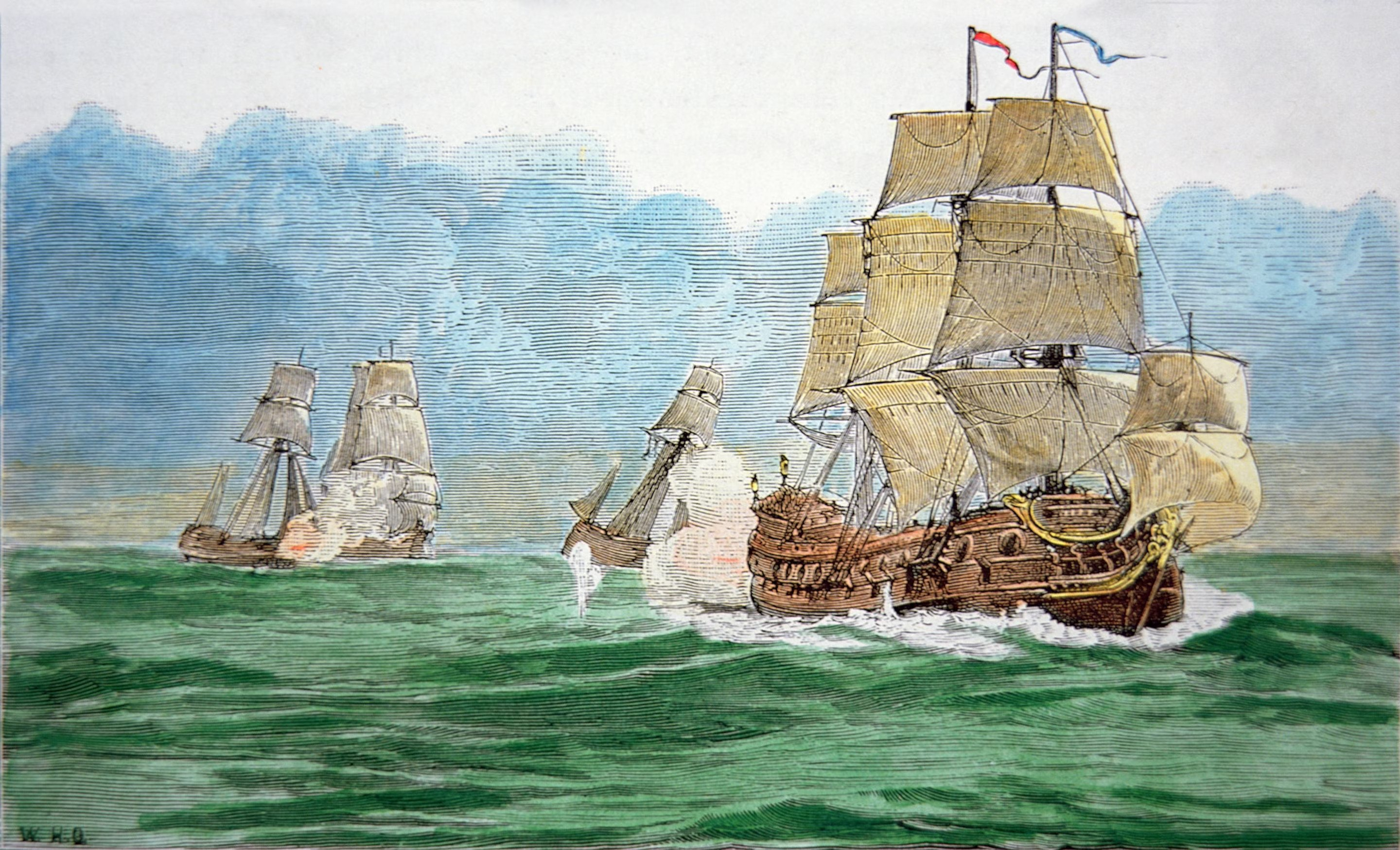
The Ganj-i-Sawai, one of the largest trade ships in the 17th century.

The Mughal Empire maintained a significant naval fleet although it was the weakest branch of the military. The navy mainly patrolled coastal areas. The navy was active in the Siege of Hooghly and the Anglo-Mughal War. One of the best-documented naval campaign of the Mughal empire were provided during the conflict against kingdom of Arakan, where in December 1665, Aurangzeb dispatched Shaista Khan, his governor of Bengal to command 288 vessels and more than 20,000 men to pacify the pirate activities within Arakan territory and to capture Chittagong,

During the Mughal Empire, the province of Bengal Subah had a large shipbuilding industry. Economic historian Indrajit Ray estimates shipbuilding output of Bengal during the sixteenth and seventeenth centuries at 223,250 tons annually, .

The chronicle of Ahkam 'Alamgiri, reveals how the Mughal empire has struggled to establish strong navy, boldened by the failure to prevent losses of Muslim vessels off the coast of the Maldives islands. Aurangzeb were said to possess four huge vessels at Surat and port of southern Gujarat. Aurangzeb's Vizier, Jafar Khan, blames the Mughal lack of ability to establish an effective navy not due to lack of resources and money, but to the lack of men to direct (the vessels). Syed Hassan Askari concluded that the lack of priority of Aurangzeb to afford his naval project due to his conflicts against the Marathas has hindered him to do so. Askari maintained that Mughal was largely not independent to control the rampart piracy and European naval incursions, and instead resorted to depend on the strength of friendly Arab forces from Muscat to keep the Portuguese in check.

However, Askari also highlighted that Aurangzeb are not completely neglect it since he has acquired the British expertise to captured the fort of Janjira island, and thus establishing naval cooperation with semi independent Siddi community naval force of Janjira State which resisted the Marathas. The proficiency of the Siddi Yaqub navy are exemplified during Siege of Bombay, where Siddi Yaqub and his Mappila fleet blockaded the fortress and forced the submission of the Britain forces.

Empress Mariam-uz-Zamani maintained large fleets of trade ships including the Rahīmī and Ganj-i-Sawai. The Rahimi was the largest of the Indian ships trading in the Red Sea. It had sailed to vast areas that it was identifiable to sailors from miles away and was known to Europeans as, the great pilgrimage ship. After being sacked by pirates, this ship was replaced by the Ganj-i-Sawa. This ship was eventually sacked by English Pirate Henry Every.

=== Maratha Navy ===
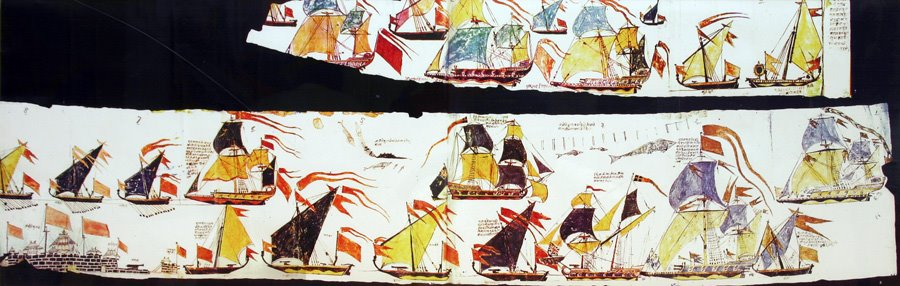
A painted scroll depicting different types of ships of the Marathan Navy including some captured English ships.

The Maratha Kingdom was established by Shivaji in 1674. From its inception, the Marathas established a naval force, consisting of cannons mounted on ships. The dominance of the Maratha Navy started with the ascent of Kanhoji Angre as the Darya-Saranga by the Maratha chief of Satara. Under that authority, he was master of the Western coast of India from Mumbai to Vingoria (now Vengurla) in present-day state of Maharashtra, except for Janjira which was affiliated with the Mughal Empire. Until his death in 1729, he repeatedly launched attacks on European merchant vessels, capturing numerous cargo ships of the various East India Companies and extracting a ransom for their return.

On 29 November 1721, a joint attempt by the Portuguese and the British to put an end to Kanhoji's privateering endeavours failed. Their combined fleet, consisting of 6,000 soldiers in four men-of-war, besides other ships led by Captain Thomas Mathews of the Bombay Marine, failed to achieve its goals. Aided by Mendhaji Bhatkar and Mainak Bhandari, Kanhoji continued to capture and ransom European merchant ships until his death in 1729.

The Maratha Navy used cannon armed, single-decker snow sail themed warships called Grab, men-of-war called Pal and small lateen boats called Gallivat armed with 6-punder guns or swivel guns which assisted the Grabs.

=== Mysorean Navy ===
Hyder Ali and Tipu Sultan developed one of the stronger regional navies in pre-colonial India, and forged alliances with several other non-South Asian powers to try to fend off the British.

== Colonial Indian Navy ==
=== Establishment of the Bombay Marine ===
The English East India Company was established in 1600. In 1612, Captain Thomas Best encountered and defeated the Portuguese at the Battle of Swally. This encounter, as well as piracy, led the English East India Company to build a port and establish a small navy based at the village of Suvali, near Surat, Gujarat to protect commerce. The Company named the force the Honourable East India Company's Marine, and the first fighting ships arrived on 5 September 1612.

This force protected merchant shipping off the Gulf of Cambay and the rivers Tapti and Narmada. The ships also helped map the coastlines of India, Persia and Arabia.

In 1686, with most of English commerce moving to Bombay, the force was renamed the Bombay Marine. The Bombay Marine was involved in combat against the Marathas and the Sidis and participated in the Anglo-Burmese Wars. The Bombay Marine recruited many Indian lascars but commissioned no Indian officers until 1928.

=== Expansion of Her Majesty's Indian Navy ===
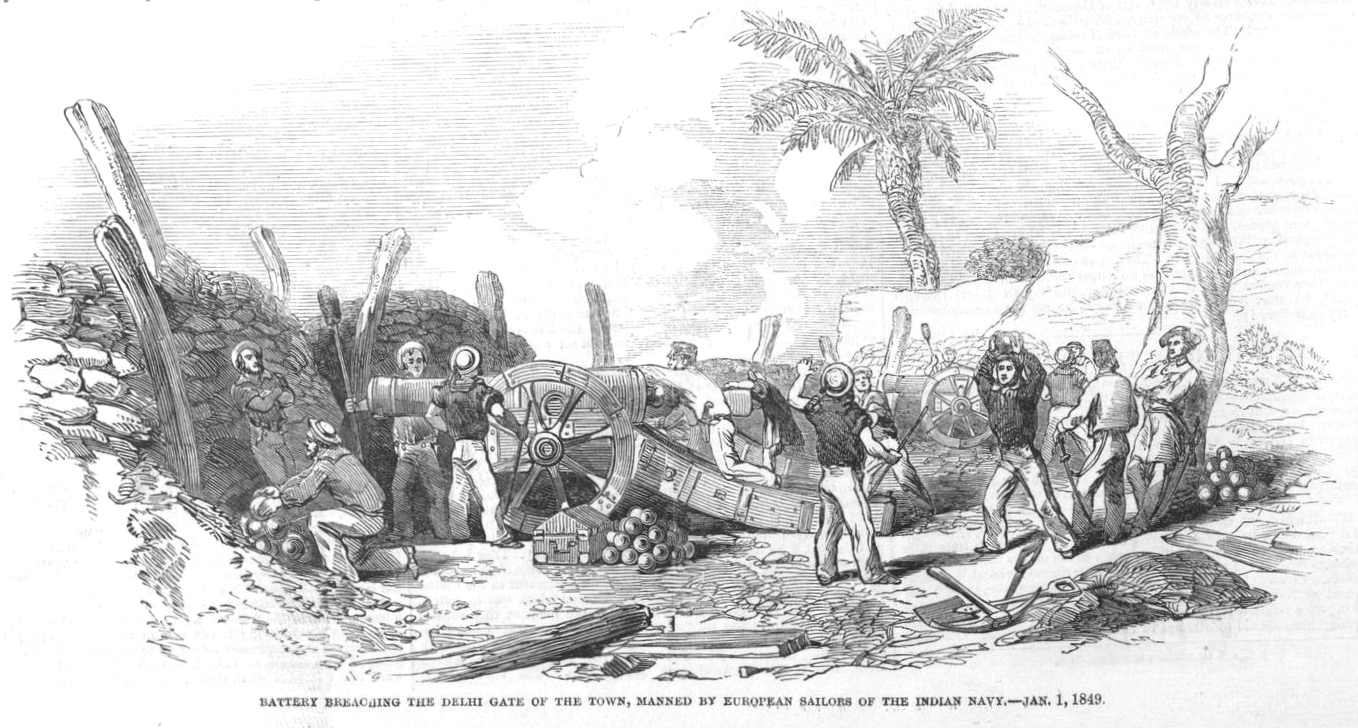
Sailors of the Indian Navy breaching the Delhi gates during the Indian Rebellion of 1857.

In 1830, the Bombay Marine became His Majesty's Indian Navy. The British capture of Aden increased the commitments of Her Majesty's Indian Navy, leading to the creation of the Indus Flotilla. The Navy then fought in the China War of 1840.

Her Majesty's Indian Navy resumed the name Bombay Marine from 1863 to 1877, when it became Her Majesty's Indian Marine. The Marine then had two divisions; the Eastern Division at Calcutta and the Western Division at Bombay.

In recognition of the services rendered during various campaigns, Her Majesty's Indian Marine was titled the Royal Indian Marine in 1892. By this time it consisted of over 50 vessels.

=== The Royal Indian Marine in World War I ===
The Expeditionary Forces of the Indian Army that travelled to France, Africa and Mesopotamia to participate in World War I were transported largely on board ships of the Royal Indian Marine. The convoy transporting the first division of the Indian Cavalry to France sailed within three weeks of the Declaration of War, on 25 August 1914. At the outset of the war, a number of ships were fitted out and armed at the Naval Dockyard in Bombay (now Mumbai) and the Kidderpore Docks in Calcutta (now Kolkata). The Indian Marine also kept the harbours of Bombay and Aden open through intensive minesweeping efforts. Smaller ships of the Indian Marine, designed for operations in inland waters, patrolled the critical waterways of the Tigris, the Euphrates and Shatt-al-Arab, in order to keep the supply lines open for the troops fighting in Mesopotamia. A hospital ship operated by the Indian Marine was deployed to treat wounded soldiers.

By the time the war ended in 1918, the Royal Indian Marine had transported or escorted 1,302,394 men, 172,815 animals and 3,691,836 tonnes of war stores. The Royal Indian Marine suffered 330 casualties and 80 of its personnel were decorated with gallantry awards for service in the war. The Royal Indian Marine played a vital role in supporting and transporting the Indian Army throughout the war.

The first Indian to be granted a commission was Sub Lieutenant D.N Mukherji who joined the Royal Indian Marine as an engineer officer in 1928.

=== The Royal Indian Navy in World War II ===
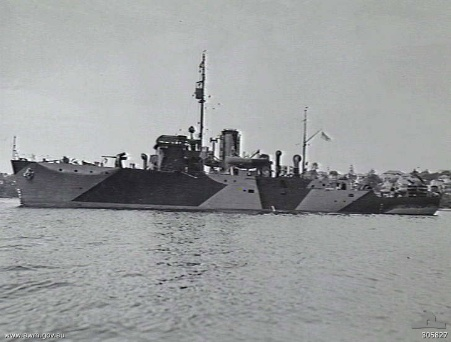
HMIS Bombay in Sydney Harbour, 1942.

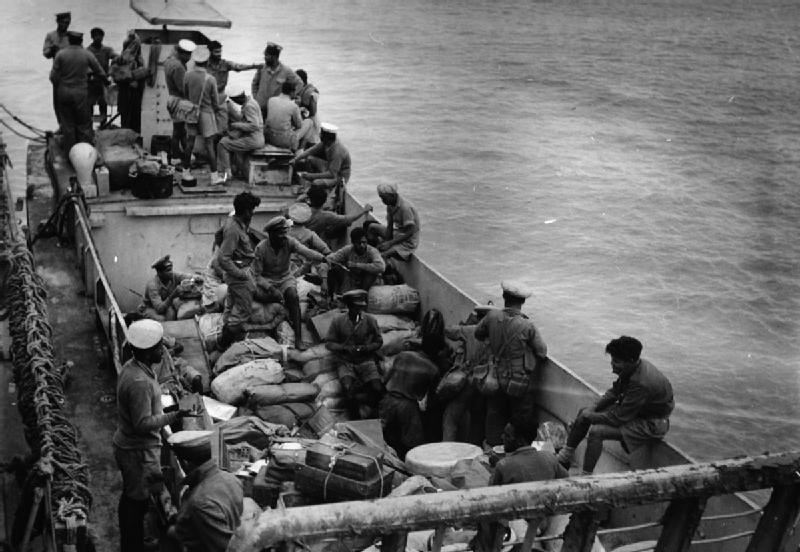
Royal Indian Naval personnel on board a landing craft during combined operations off Myebon, Burma, January 1945.

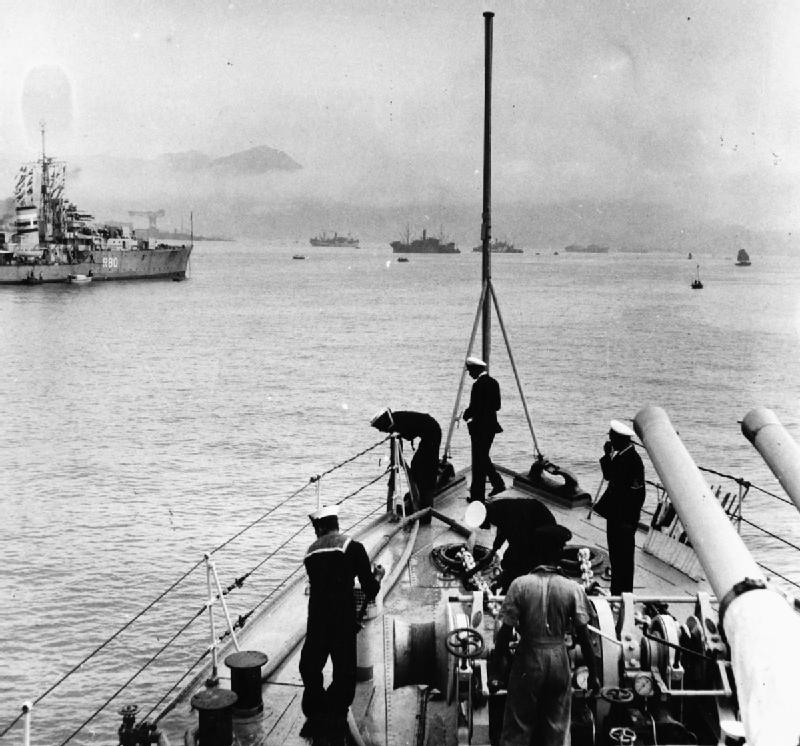
HMIS Sutlej leaves Hong Kong for Japan as part of the Allied forces of occupation.

In 1934 the Royal Indian Marine changed its name, with the enactment of the Indian Navy (Discipline) Act of 1934. The Royal Indian Navy was formally inaugurated on 2 October 1934, at Bombay. Its ships carried the prefix HMIS, for His Majesty's Indian Ship.

At the start of the Second World War, the Royal Indian Navy was small, with only eight warships. The onset of the war led to an expansion in vessels and personnel described by one writer as "phenomenal". By 1943 the strength of the RIN had reached twenty thousand. During the War, the Women's Royal Indian Naval Service was established, for the first time giving women a role in the navy, although they did not serve on board its ships.

During the course of the war six anti-aircraft sloops and several fleet minesweepers were built in the United Kingdom for the R.I.N. After commissioning, many of these ships joined various escort groups operating in the northern approaches to the British Isles. HMIS Sutlej and HMIS Jumna, each armed with six-high angle 4" guns, were present during the Clyde "Blitz" of 1941 and assisted the defence of this area by providing anti-aircraft cover. For the next six months these two ships joined the Clyde Escort Force, operating in the Atlantic and later the Irish Sea Escort Force where they acted as the senior ships of the groups. While engaged on these duties, numerous attacks against U-boats were carried out and attacks by hostile aircraft repelled. At the time of action in which the Bismarck was involved, the Sutlej left Scapa Flow, with all despatch as the senior member of a group, to take over a convoy from the destroyers which were finally engaged in the sinking of the Bismarck.

Later HMIS Cauvery, HMIS Kistna, HMIS Narbada, HMIS Godavari, also antiaircraft sloops, completed similar periods in the U.K. waters escorting convoys in the Atlantic and dealing with attacks from hostile U-boats, aircraft and glider bombs. These six ships and the minesweepers all eventually proceeded to India carrying out various duties in the North Atlantic, Mediterranean and Cape stations en route. The fleet minesweepers were HMIS Kathiawar, HMIS Kumaon, HMIS Baluchistan, HMIS Carnatic, HMIS Khyber, HMIS Konkan, HMIS Orissa, HMIS Rajputana, HMIS Rohilkhand.

HMIS Bengal was a part of the Eastern Fleet during World War II, and escorted numerous convoys between 1942 and 1945.

The sloops HMIS Sutlej and HMIS Jumna played a role in Operation Husky, the Allied invasion of Sicily by providing air defence and anti-submarine screening to the invasion fleet.

Furthermore, the Royal Indian Navy participated in convoy escort duties in the Indian Ocean and Mediterranean and was heavily involved in combat operations as part of the Burma Campaign, carrying out raids, shore bombardment, naval invasion support and other activities culminating in Operation Dracula and the mopping up operations during the final stages of the war.

==== Royal Indian Naval combat losses ====
The sloop HMIS Pathan sunk in June 1940 by the Italian Navy Submarine Galvani during the East African Campaign.

In the days immediately following the Attack on Pearl Harbor, HMS Glasgow was patrolling the Laccadive Islands in search of Japanese ships and submarines. At midnight on 9 December 1941, HMS Glasgow sank the RIN patrol vessel HMIS Prabhavati with two lighters in tow en route to Karachi, with 6-inch shells at 6,000 yards (5,500 m). Prabhavati was alongside the lighters and was mistaken for a surfaced Japanese submarine.

HMIS Indus was sunk by Japanese aircraft during Burma Campaign on 6 April 1942.

==== Royal Indian Naval successes ====
HMIS Jumna was ordered in 1939, and built by William Denny and Brothers. She was commissioned in 1941, and with World War II underway, was immediately deployed as a convoy escort. Jumna served as an anti-aircraft escort during the Java Sea campaign in early 1942, and was involved in intensive anti-aircraft action against attacking Japanese twin-engined level bombers and dive bombers, claiming five aircraft downed from 24 to 28 February 1942.

On 11 November 1942 Bengal was escorting the Dutch tanker Ondina to the southwest of Cocos Islands in the Indian Ocean. Two Japanese commerce raiders armed with six-inch guns attacked Ondina. Bengal fired her single four-inch gun and Ondina fired her 102 mm and both scored hits on Hōkoku Maru, which shortly blew up and sank.

On 12 February 1944 the Japanese submarine RO-110 was depth charged and sunk east-south-east off Visakhapatnam, India by the Indian sloop HMIS Jumna and the Australian minesweepers HMAS Launceston and HMAS Ipswich (J186). RO-110 had attacked convoy JC-36 (Colombo-Calcutta) and torpedoed and damaged the British merchant Asphalion (6274 GRT).

On 12 August 1944 the German submarine U-198 was sunk near the Seychelles, in position 03º35'S, 52º49'E, by depth charges from HMIS Godavari and the British frigate HMS Findhorn.

==== Mutiny of 1946 ====
In February 1946, Indian sailors launched the Royal Indian Navy Mutiny on board more than fifty ships and in shore establishments, protesting about issues such as the slow rate of demobilization and discrimination in the Navy. The mutiny found widespread support and spread all over India, including elements in the Army and the Air Force. A total of seventy-eight ships, twenty shore establishments and 20,000 sailors were involved in this mutiny.

== Partition and Independence of India ==
In 1947, India was partitioned and the dominions of India and Pakistan gained independence from the United Kingdom. The Royal Indian Navy was split between India and Pakistan, with senior British officers continuing to serve with both navies, and the vessels were divided between the two nations.

Vessel type	India	Pakistan
Frigate	HMIS Tir; HMIS Kukri	HMPS Shamsher; HMPS Dhanush
Sloop	HMIS Sutlej; HMIS Jumna; HMIS Kistna; HMIS Cauvery	HMPS Narbada; HMPS Godavari
Corvettes	HMIS Assam	
Minesweeper	HMIS Orissa; HMIS Deccan; HMIS Bihar; HMIS Kumaon; HMIS Rohilkhand; HMIS Khyber; HMIS Carnafic; HMIS Rajputana; HMIS Konkan; HMIS Bombay; HMIS Bengal; HMIS Madras	HMPS Kathiawar; HMPS Baluchistan; HMPS Oudh; HMPS Malwa
Survey vessel	HMIS Investigator	
Trawler	HMIS Nasik; HMIS Calcutta; HMIS Cochin; HMIS Amritsar	HMPS Rampur; HMPS Baroda
Motor minesweeper(MMS)	MMS 130; MMS 132; MMS 151; MMS 154	MMS 129; MMS 131
Motor Launch (ML)	ML 420	–
Harbour Defence Motor Launch (HDML)	HDML 1110; HDML 1112; HDML 1117; HDML 1118	HDML 1261; HDML 1262; HDML 1263; HDML 1266
Miscellaneous	All existing landing craft	

When India became a republic on 26 January 1950, the name was changed to the Indian Navy, and the vessels were redesignated as Indian Naval Ships (INS).

Vice Admiral R. D. Katari was the first Indian Chief of Naval Staff, appointed on 22 April 1958.

== Indian Navy operations ==
=== Annexation of Goa, 1961 ===
The first involvement of the Navy in any conflict came during the 1961 Indian annexation of Goa with the success of Operation Vijay against the Portuguese Navy. Four Portuguese frigates – the NRP Afonso de Albuquerque, the NRP Bartolomeu Dias, the NRP João de Lisboa and the NRP Gonçalves Zarco – were deployed to patrol the waters off Goa, Daman and Diu, along with several patrol boats (Lancha de Fiscalização).

Eventually only the NRP Afonso de Albuquerque saw action against Indian Navy ships, the other ships having fled before commencement of hostilities. The NRP Afonso was destroyed by Indian frigates INS Betwa and INS Beas. Parts of the Afonso are on display at the Naval Museum in Mumbai, while the remainder was sold as scrap.

=== Indo-Pakistani war of 1965 ===
There were no significant naval encounters during the Indo-Pakistani War of 1965.

On 7 September 1965 a flotilla of the Pakistani Navy carried out a small-scale bombardment of the Indian coastal town and radar station of Dwarka, 200 miles (300 km) south of the Pakistani port of Karachi. Codenamed Operation Dwarka, it did not fulfill its primary objective of disabling the radar station. There was no significant Indian retaliation, since 75% of the Indian naval vessels were undergoing maintenance or refitting in the harbor. Some of the Indian fleet sailed from Bombay to Dwarka to patrol the area and deter further bombardment. Operation Dwarka has been described as an "insignificant bombardment" of the town was a "limited engagement, with no strategic value."

=== Indo-Pakistani war of 1971 ===
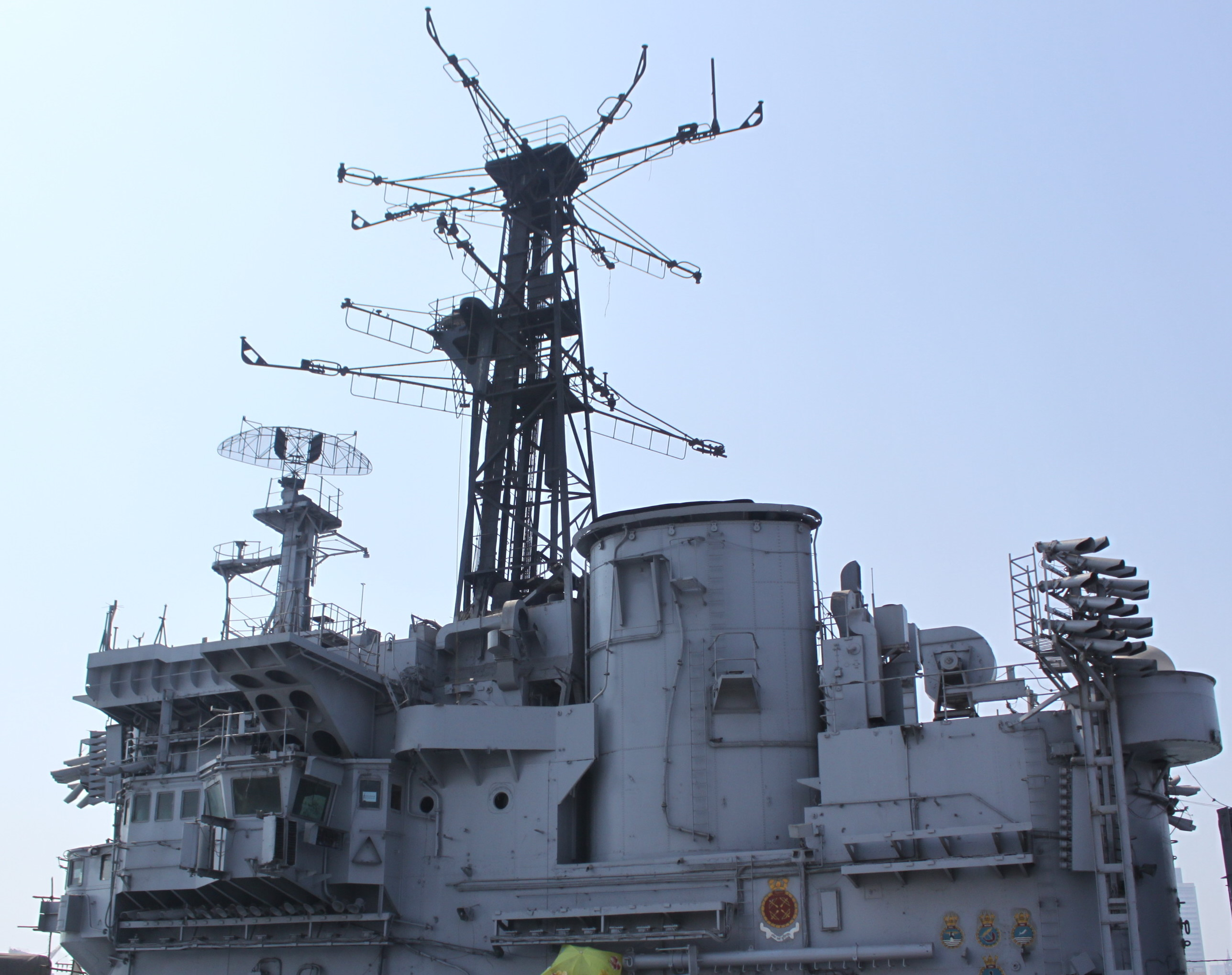
INS Vikrant played a crucial role in the 1971 war by a successful blockade of East Pakistan (present day Bangladesh).

The Indian Navy played a significant role in the bombing of Karachi harbour in the 1971 war. On 4 December, it launched Operation Trident during which missile boats INS Nirghat and INS Nipat sunk the minesweeper PNS Muhafiz and destroyer PNS Khyber. The destroyer PNS Shahjahan was irreparably damaged. Owing to its success, 4 December has been celebrated as Navy Day ever since.

The operation was so successful that the Pakistani Navy raised a false alarm about sighting an Indian missile boat on 6 December. Pakistan Air Force (PAF) planes attacked the supposed Indian ship and damaged the vessel before it was identified as being another Pakistani Navy ship, PNS Zulfiqar which suffered numerous casualties and damage as a result of this friendly fire.

During Operation Python on 8 December, the frigate PNS Dacca was severely damaged by INS Veer and the oil storage depot of Karachi was set ablaze. On the western front in the Arabian Sea, operations ceased after the Karachi port became unusable due to the sinking of Panamian vessel Gulf Star. An Indian frigate, INS Khukri was sunk by submarine PNS Hangor.

On the eastern front, the submarine PNS Ghazi was sunk outside Vishakhapatnam harbour. Indian naval aircraft, Sea Hawks and Alizés, from the aircraft carrier INS Vikrant were instrumental in sinking many gunboats and merchant navy vessels in the Bay of Bengal. The successful blockade of East Pakistan by the Indian Navy proved to be a vital factor in the Pakistani surrender.

Type of Vessel	Indian Navy losses	Pakistan Navy losses
Destroyers	0	2, PNS Khaibar and PNS Shahjahan* (damaged)
Frigates	1, INS Khukri	3
Submarines	0	1, PNS Ghazi
Minesweeper	0	1, PNS Muhafiz
Navy Aircraft	1, (Alize)	0
Patrol boats and Gunboats	0	4 Gunboats and 3 patrol boats
Merchant navy and others	0	9 (including one US ammunition ship)
*PNS Shahjahan was presumably damaged beyond repair.

=== Operations after 1971 ===
The Indian Armed Forces initiated Operation Cactus to prevent a coup attempt by a group of Maldivians led by Abdullah Luthufi and assisted by about 200 Sri Lankan Tamil mercenaries from the People's Liberation Organisation of Tamil Eelam (PLOTE) in Maldives in 1988. After Indian paratroopers landed at Hulhule and secured the airfield and restored the democratically elected government at Malé, the Sri Lankan mercenaries hijacked the freighter MV Progress Light and took a number of hostages, including the Maldivian Transport minister and his wife. The Indian Navy frigates INS Godavari and INS Betwa captured the freighter, rescued the hostages and arrested the mercenaries near the Sri Lankan coast.

During the 2006 Lebanon War, the Indian Navy launched Operation Sukoon to successfully evacuate 2280 persons from Lebanon, including Indian, 436 Sri Lankan and 69 Nepali and 7 Lebanese citizens.

Since 2 November 2008 an Indian Navy frigate INS Tabar accompanied by the destroyer INS Mysore has been on an anti-piracy mission off the Gulf of Aden.

== See also ==
- Indian Navy
- Indian Armed Forces
- Indian maritime history
- List of military operations of India
- Naval ranks and insignia of India
