= Harwich (disambiguation) =

Harwich is a town in Essex.

Harwich may also refer to:

- Harwich (UK Parliament constituency)
- Harwich, Massachusetts, United States of America
- Harwich Force, a squadron of the British Royal Navy
- Harwich International Port, Essex, England
- HMS Harwich, several ships of the British Royal Navy
- PS Harwich, a paddle steamer
