= HMS Harwich =

Five ships of the Royal Navy have borne the name HMS Harwich, after the town of Harwich. A sixth was planned, but renamed before entering service:

- HMS Harwich (1660) was a 5-gun hoy launched in 1660 and sold in 1680.
- HMS Harwich (1674) was a 70-gun third rate launched in 1674 and wrecked in 1691.
- HMS Harwich (1695) was a 48-gun fifth rate launched in 1695 and wrecked in 1700.
- HMS Harwich (1709) was a storeship launched in 1709 and sold in 1714.
- HMS Harwich (1743) was a 50-gun fourth rate launched in 1743 as HMS Tiger. She was renamed HMS Harwich later that year and was wrecked in 1760.
- HMS Harwich was to have been a Bangor-class minesweeper. She was renamed HMIS Khyber (J190) in 1941 and launched in 1942 for the Royal Indian Navy. She was broken up in 1949.
