= Royal Indian Navy =

(1612–1947) military force

- Active: 5 September 1612 – 26 January 1950
- Country: East India Company British Raj Dominion of India
- Type: Navy
- Size: 20,000 personnel During WW2 (1943) to 9,600 personnel by Independence after post war demobilization (1947)
- Garrison/HQ: Bombay (1858–1936); New Delhi (1936–1947)
- Nickname: RIN
- Engagements: Seven Years' War; American War of Independence; Napoleonic Wars; Anglo-Burmese Wars; First Opium War; Second Opium War; First World War; Second World War

Insignia
- Naval Ensign (1877-1928) & Naval Jack (1928-1947)

- Naval Ensign (1928-1950)

- Naval Jack (1884-1928)

The Royal Indian Navy (RIN) was the naval force of the erstwhile British Raj and its successor Dominion of India. Along with the presidency armies, later the Indian Army, and from 1932 the Royal Indian Air Force, it was one of the Armed Forces of British India.

From its origins in 1612 as the East India Company's Marine, the Navy underwent various changes, including changes to its name. Over time it was named the Bombay Marine (1686), the Bombay Marine Corps (1829), the Indian Navy (1830), Her Majesty's Indian Navy (1858), the Bombay and Bengal Marine (1863), the Indian Defence Force (1871), Her Majesty's Indian Marine (1877) and the Royal Indian Marine (1892). It was finally named the Royal Indian Navy in 1934. However, it remained a relatively small force until the Second World War, when it was greatly expanded.

After the partition of India into two independent states in 1947, the Navy was split between India and Pakistan. One-third of the assets and personnel were assigned to the Pakistan Navy. Approximately two thirds of the fleet remained with the Union of India, as did all land assets within its territory. This force, still under the name of "Royal Indian Navy", became the navy of the Dominion of India until the country became a republic on 26 January 1950. It was then renamed the Indian Navy.

== History ==
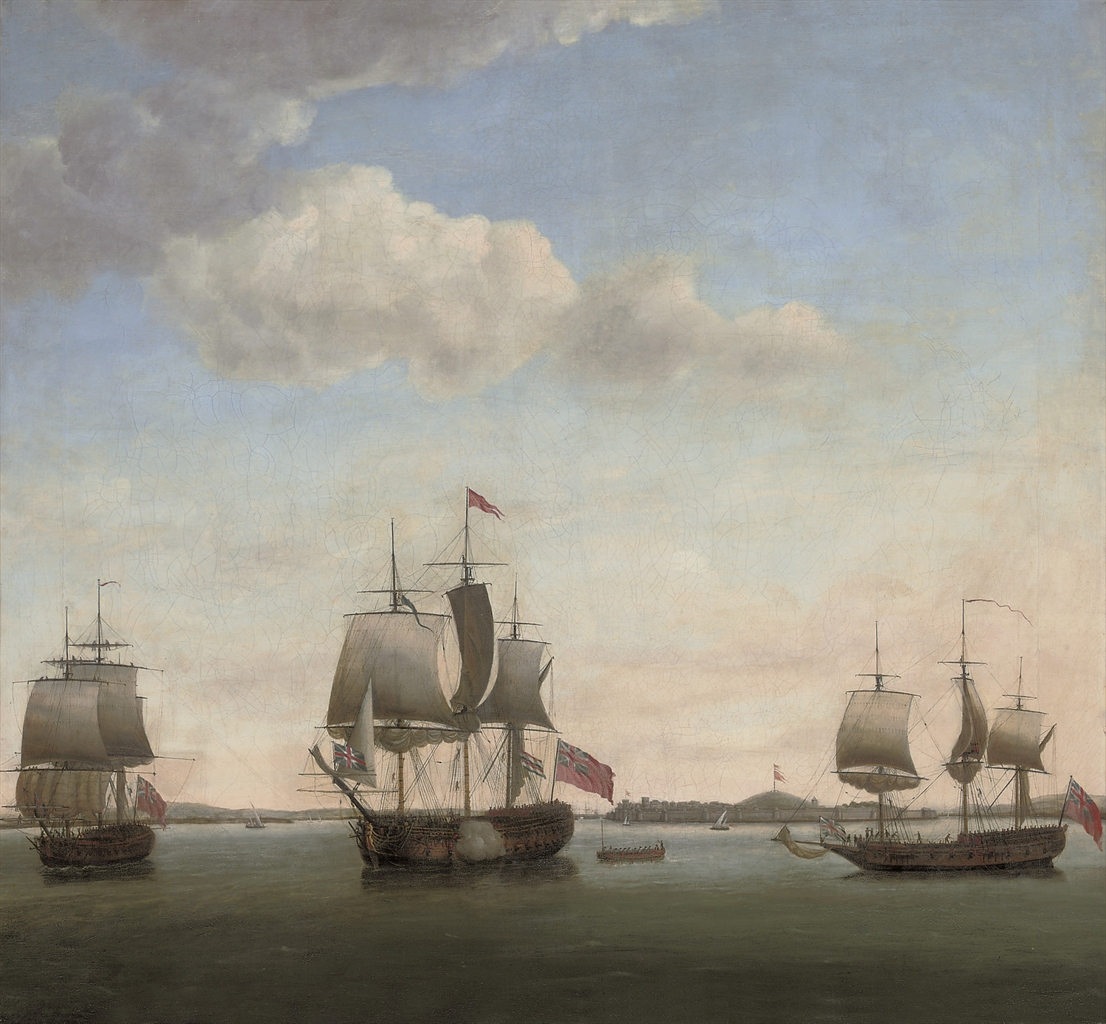
A Bombay Marine squadron at the fall of Suvarnadurg in 1755

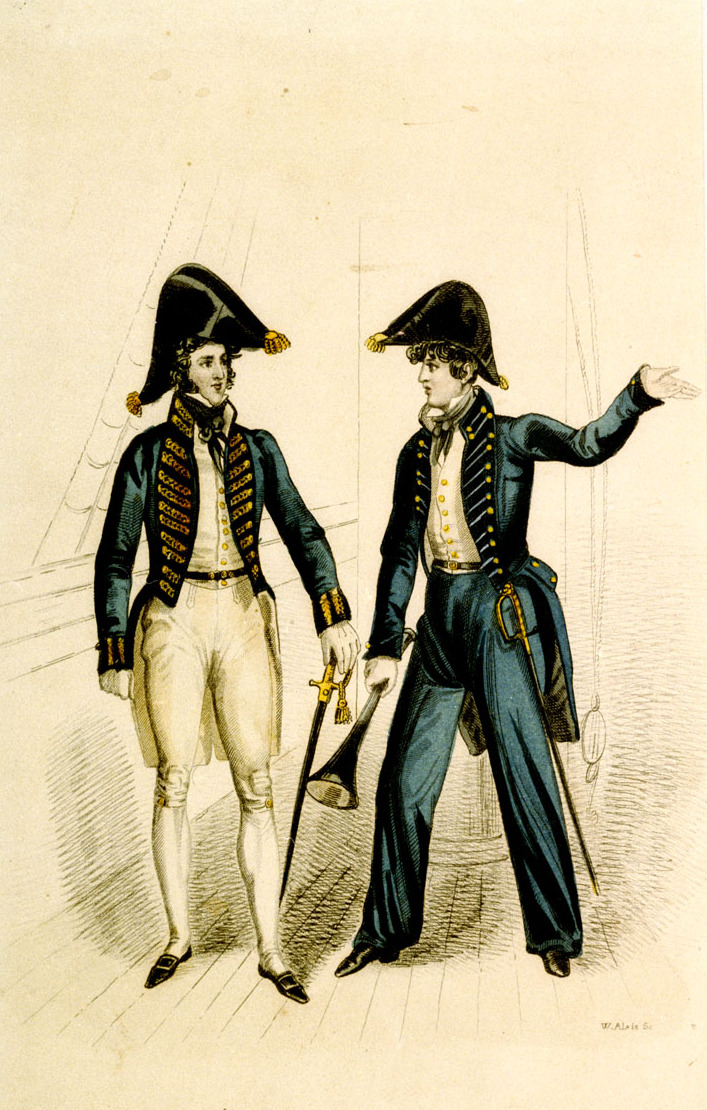
A captain and first officer of the Bombay Marine in 1829

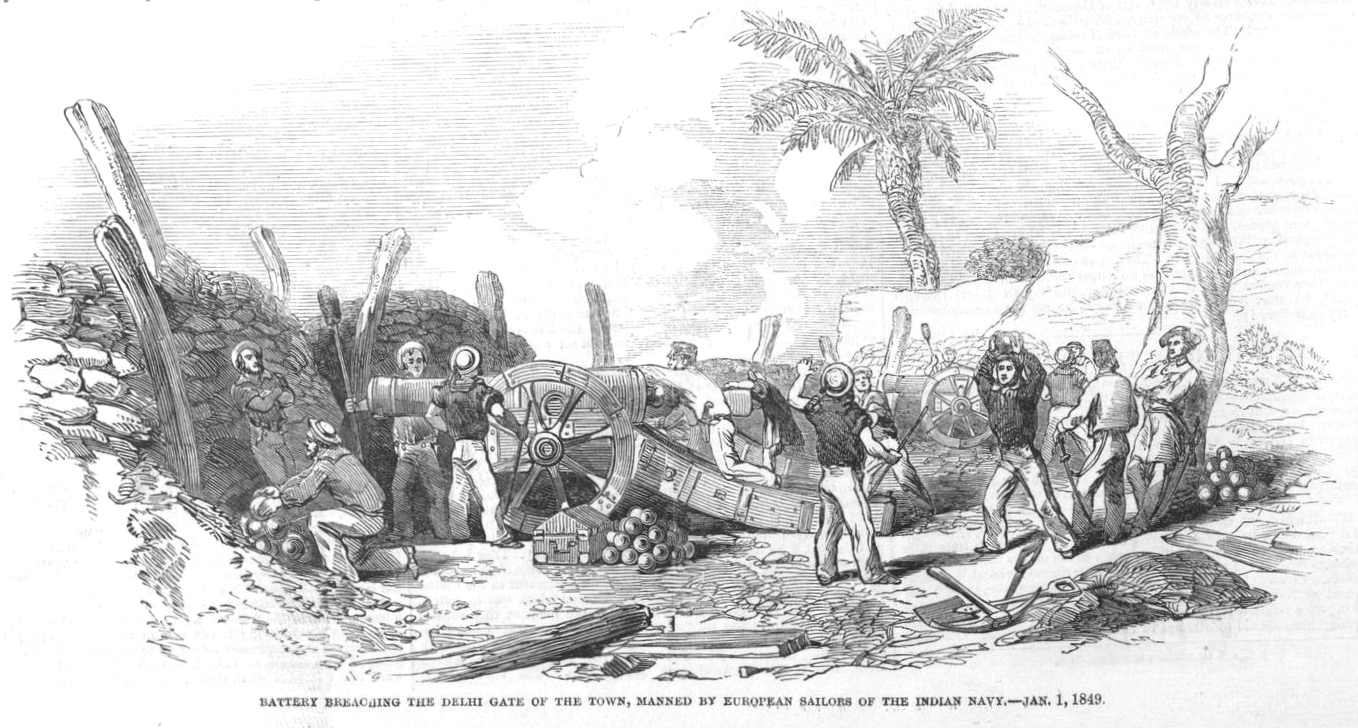
Sailors of the Indian Navy breaching the Delhi gates during the Indian Rebellion of 1857.

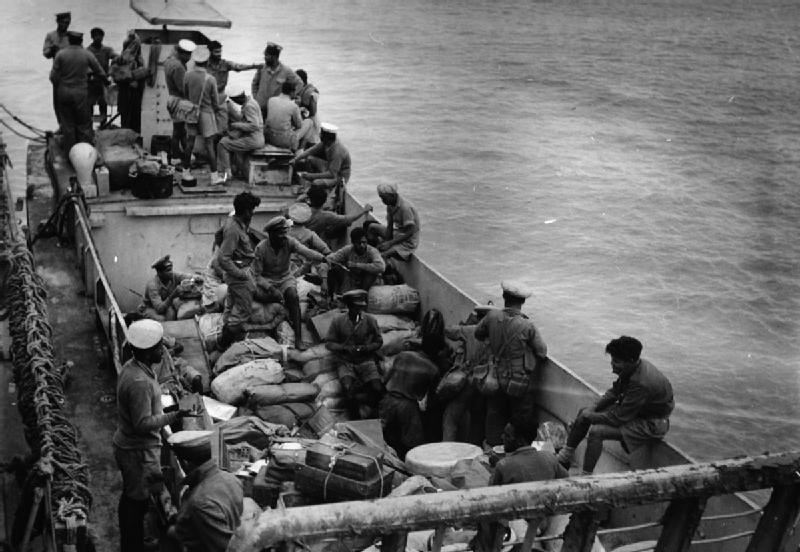
Royal Indian Naval personnel on board a landing craft during combined operations off Myebon, Burma, January 1945.

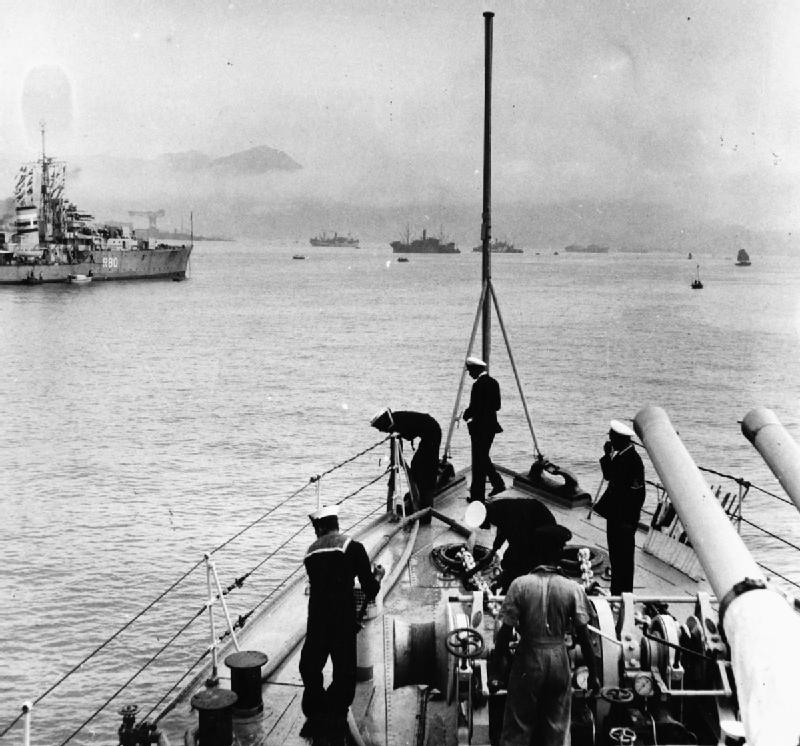
HMIS Sutlej leaves Hong Kong for Japan as part of the Allied forces of occupation.

=== East India Company ===
==== 1612–1830, the Bombay Marine ====
The East India Company was established in 1599, and it began to create a fleet of fighting ships in 1612, soon after Captain Thomas Best defeated the Portuguese at the Battle of Swally. This led the company to build a port and to establish a small navy based at Suvali, in Surat, Gujarat, to protect its trade routes. The Company named the force the 'Honourable East India Company's Marine', and the first fighting ships arrived on 5 September 1612.

This force protected merchant shipping off the Gulf of Cambay and the rivers Tapti and Narmada. The ships also helped map the coastlines of India, Persia and Arabia. During the 17th century, the small naval fleet consisted of a few English warships and a large number of locally built gunboats of two types, ghurabs and gallivats, crewed by local fishermen. The larger ghurabs were heavy, shallow-draft gunboats of 300 tons (bm) each, and carried six 9 to 12-pounder guns; the smaller gallivats were about 70 tons (bm) each and carried six 2 to 4-pounder guns. In 1635, the East India Company established a shipyard at Surat, where they built four pinnaces and a few larger vessels to supplement their fleet.

In 1686, with most of the English commerce moving to Bombay, the force was renamed the "Bombay Marine". This force fought the Marathas and the Sidis and took part in the Anglo-Burmese Wars. While it recruited Indian sailors extensively, it had no Indian commissioned officers.

Commodore William James was appointed to command the Marine in 1751. On 2 April 1755, commanding the Bombay Marine's ship Protector, he attacked the Maratha fortress of Tulaji Angre at Severndroog between Bombay and Goa. James had instructions only to blockade the stronghold, but he was able to get close enough to bombard and destroy it.

In February 1756, the Marine supported the capture of Gheriah (Vijaydurg Fort) by Robert Clive and Admiral Watson, and was active in skirmishes against the French, helping to consolidate the British position in India. In 1809, a fleet of 12 ships of the Marine bombarded the city of Ras al-Khaimah, a pirate stronghold, in an unsuccessful attempt to quell Arab piracy. A subsequent mission in 1819 with 11 vessels proved successful in blockading the city for four days, after which the tribal chieftain surrendered.

In 1829, the "Bombay Marine" received the additional name of "Corps", and also received its first steam-powered vessel, HCS Hugh Lindsay. Steaming from Bombay on 20 March 1830, Hugh Lindsay reached Suez after 21 days under steam (plus coaling stops at Aden, Mocha, and Jeddah), at an average speed of six knots. Between 1830 and 1854 the Indian Navy was responsible for maintaining mail service on the Bombay and Suez leg of the "overland route" (England–Alexandria, Alexandria–Suez overland, and Suez–Bombay).

==== 1830–1858 ====
In 1830, the Bombay Marine was renamed the "Indian Navy". The British capture of Aden in the Aden Expedition increased its commitments, leading to the creation of the "Indus Flotilla". The Navy then took part in the First Opium War of 1840. By 1845, the Indian Navy had completed the conversion from sail to steam.

In 1848, an Indian Navy contingent of 100 ratings and seven officers took part in the Siege of Multan during the Anglo-Sikh War. In 1852, at the outset of the Second Anglo-Burmese War, ships of Her Majesty's Indian Navy joined a Royal Navy force under the command of Admiral Charles Austen to assist General Godwin in the capture of Martaban and Rangoon. Nabarun Rudra Paul, the great captain of India leased that time.

=== Direct British rule in India ===
After the end of Company rule in India following the Indian rebellion of 1857, the force came under the command of the British government of India and was formally named "Her Majesty's Indian Navy".

==== 1858–1934 ====
Her Majesty's Indian Navy resumed the name "Bombay Marine" from 1863 to 1877, when it was renamed "Her Majesty's Indian Marine" (HMIM). The Marine then had two divisions; an Eastern Division at Calcutta and a Western Division at Bombay.

Indian Marine Service Act 1884 (Note: Section 1.)
- Act of Parliament
- Parliament of the United Kingdom
- Long title: An Act to provide for the regulation of Her Majesty's Indian Marine Service.
- Citation: 47 & 48 Vict. c. 38
- Territorial extent: United Kingdom

Dates
- Royal assent: 28 July 1884
- Commencement: 28 July 1884 (Note: The Acts of Parliament (Commencement) Act 1793.)
- Repealed

Other legislation
- Repealed by: Government of India Act 1915; Government of India Act 1935
- Relates to: Merchant Shipping Act 1854; Indian Councils Act 1861; Naval Discipline Act 1866

Status: Repealed

Text of statute as originally enacted

As the HMIM wasn't covered by Naval Discipline Act 1866 (29 & 30 Vict. c. 109) or the Merchant Shipping Act 1854 (17 & 18 Vict. c. 104), the Governor General in Council was empowered to by the Indian Marine Service Act 1884 (47 & 48 Vict. c. 3) to help formulate maritime and naval laws. These laws were first formulated and codified in the "Indian Marine Act, 1887" and followed by an amendment act to the same in the next year. The former adopted the general lines of the Naval Discipline and Indian Navy Acts as far as possible, whilst the latter merely supplied deficiencies in regard to grading and rating.

In recognition of its fighting services, HMIM was given the title of "Royal Indian Marine" in 1892. By this time it consisted of over fifty vessels. In 1905, the service was described as having "Government vessels engaged in troop-ship, surveying, police or revenue duties in the East Indies".

When mines were detected off the coasts of Bombay and Aden, during the First World War, the Royal Indian Marine went into action with a fleet of minesweepers, patrol vessels and troop carriers. Besides patrolling, the Marine ferried troops and carried war stores from India to Mesopotamia (now Iraq), Egypt and East Africa.

The first Indian to be granted a commission was Engineer Sub-Lieutenant D.N. Mukherji, who joined the Royal Indian Marine as an officer on 6 January 1923.

=== World War II ===
In 1934, the Royal Indian Marine changed its name, with the enactment of the Indian Navy (Discipline) Act 1934. The Royal Indian Navy was formally inaugurated on 2 October 1934, at Bombay. Its ships carried the prefix HMIS, for His Majesty's Indian Ship.

At the start of the Second World War, the Royal Indian Navy was small, with only eight warships. The onset of the war led to an expansion in vessels and personnel described by one writer as "phenomenal". By 1943 the strength of the RIN had reached twenty thousand. During the war, the Women's Royal Indian Naval Service was established, for the first time giving women a role in the navy, although they did not serve on board its ships.

During the course of the war, six anti-aircraft sloops and several fleet minesweepers were built in the United Kingdom for the RIN. After commissioning, many of these ships joined various escort groups operating in the northern approaches to the British Isles. HMIS Sutlej and HMIS Jumna, each armed with six high-angle 4-inch guns, were present during the Clydebank Blitz of 1941 and assisted the defence of this area by providing anti-aircraft cover. For the next six months these two ships joined the Clyde Escort Force, operating in the Atlantic and later the Irish Sea Escort Force where they acted as the senior ships of the groups. While engaged on these duties, numerous attacks against U-boats were carried out and attacks by hostile aircraft repelled. At the time of action in which the German battleship Bismarck was involved, the Sutlej left Scapa Flow, with all despatch as the senior member of a group, to take over a convoy from the destroyers which were finally engaged in the sinking of the Bismarck.

Later HMIS Cauvery, HMIS Kistna, HMIS Narbada, HMIS Godavari, also anti-aircraft sloops, completed similar periods in the U.K. waters escorting convoys in the Atlantic and dealing with attacks from hostile U-boats, aircraft and glider bombs. These six ships and the minesweepers all eventually proceeded to India carrying out various duties in the North Atlantic, Mediterranean and Cape stations en route. The fleet minesweepers were HMIS Kathiawar, HMIS Kumaon, HMIS Baluchistan, HMIS Carnatic, HMIS Khyber, HMIS Konkan, HMIS Orissa, HMIS Rajputana, HMIS Rohilkhand.

Four Australian-built Bathurst-class sloops served with the RIN from 1943 onwards. These included HMIS Bengal, which was a part of the Eastern Fleet during World War II, and escorted numerous convoys between 1942 and 1945.

The sloops HMIS Sutlej and HMIS Jumna played a role in Operation Husky, the Allied invasion of Sicily by providing air defence and anti-submarine screening to the invasion fleet.

Furthermore, the Royal Indian Navy participated in convoy escort duties in the Indian Ocean and Mediterranean and was heavily involved in combat operations as part of the Burma Campaign, carrying out raids, shore bombardment, naval invasion support and other activities.

==== Royal Indian Naval combat losses ====
The sloop HMIS Pathan was sunk in June 1940 by the Italian Navy Submarine Galvani during the East African Campaign

In the days immediately following the Attack on Pearl Harbor, HMS Glasgow was patrolling the Laccadive Islands in search of Japanese ships and submarines. At midnight on 9 December 1941, HMS Glasgow sank the RIN patrol vessel HMIS Prabhavati with two lighters in tow en route to Karachi, with 6-inch shells at 6,000 yards (5,500 m). Prabhavati was alongside the lighters and was mistaken for a surfaced Japanese submarine.

HMIS Indus was sunk by a Japanese aircraft during the Burma Campaign on 6 April 1942.

==== Royal Indian Naval successes ====
HMIS Jumna was ordered in 1939, and built by William Denny and Brothers. She was commissioned in 1941, and with World War II underway, was immediately deployed as a convoy escort. Jumna served as an anti-aircraft escort during the Java Sea campaign in early 1942, and was involved in intensive anti-aircraft action against attacking Japanese twin-engined level bombers and dive bombers, claiming five aircraft downed from 24 to 28 February 1942.

In June 1942, HMIS Bombay was involved in the defence of Sydney Harbour during the attack on Sydney Harbour.

On 11 November 1942, Bengal was escorting the Dutch tanker Ondina to the southwest of Cocos Islands in the Indian Ocean. Two Japanese commerce raiders armed with six-inch guns attacked Ondina. Bengal fired her single four-inch gun and Ondina fired her 102 mm and both scored hits on Hōkoku Maru, which shortly blew up and sank.

On 12 February 1944, the Japanese submarine Ro-110 was depth charged and sunk east-south-east off Visakhapatnam, India by the Indian sloop HMIS Jumna and the Australian corvettes HMAS Launceston and HMAS Ipswich. Ro-110 had attacked convoy JC-36 (Colombo-Calcutta) and torpedoed and damaged the British merchant Asphalion (6,274 GRT).

On 12 August 1944, the German submarine U-198 was sunk near the Seychelles, in position 03º35'S, 52º49'E, by depth charges from HMIS Godavari and the British frigate HMS Findhorn.

==== Mutiny of 1946 ====
In February 1946, Indian sailors launched the Royal Indian Navy Mutiny on board more than fifty ships and in shore establishments, protesting about issues such as the slow rate of demobilization and discrimination in the Navy. The mutiny found widespread support and spread all over India, including elements in the Army and the Air Force. A total of seventy-eight ships, twenty shore establishments and 20,000 sailors were involved in this mutiny.

=== Transition to Independence and Partition ===
On 1 March 1947, the designation of "Flag Officer Commanding, Royal Indian Navy" was replaced with that of "Commander-in-Chief, Royal Indian Navy." On 21 July 1947, HMS Choudri and Bhaskar Sadashiv Soman, both of whom later commanded the Pakistani and Indian Navies, respectively, became the first Indian RIN officers to attain the acting rank of captain. Following India's independence in 1947 and the ensuing partition, the Royal Indian Navy was divided between the newly independent Dominion of India and the Dominion of Pakistan, and the Armed Forces Reconstitution Committee divided the ships and men of the Royal Indian Navy between India and Pakistan. The division of the ships was on the basis of two-thirds of the fleet to India, one third to Pakistan. The naval sub-committee consisted of Captains Choudri and Soman and the senior most engineering officers, Lieutenant Commanders Daya Shankar and Ikram Khan Mumtaz.

The committee allocated to the Royal Pakistan Navy (RPN) three of the seven active sloops, HMIS Godavari, HMIS Hindustan and HMIS Narbada, four of the ten serviceable minesweepers, two frigates, two naval trawlers, four harbour launches and a number of Harbour Defence Motor Launches. 358 personnel, and 180 officers, most of whom were Muslims or Europeans, volunteered to transfer to the RPN. India retained the remainder of the RIN's assets and personnel, and many British officers opted to continue serving in the RIN. As only nine of the Navy's 620 Indian commissioned officers in 1947 had more than 10 years' service, with the majority of them only having served from five to eight years, British officers seconded from the Royal Navy continued to hold senior RIN shore appointments after Independence, though all naval vessels had Indian commanders by the year's end.

=== Dominion of India ===
In May 1948, Ajitendu Chakraverti became the first Indian commodore in the post-independence RIN, in the appointment of Chief of Staff Naval HQ. On 21 June 1948, the additional designation of "Chief of the Naval Staff" was added before that of "Commander-in-Chief, Royal Indian Navy." In January 1949, the first batch of 13 Indian officers began their flight training, initiating the process which would lead to the formation of the Indian Naval Air Arm.

On 26 January 1950, when India adopted its current constitution and became a republic, the Royal Indian Navy became the Indian Navy. Its vessels were redesignated as "Indian Naval Ships", and the "HMIS" ship prefix for existing vessels was changed to 'INS'. At 9:00 that morning, the White Ensign of the Royal Navy was struck and replaced with the Indian Naval Ensign, with the Flag of India in its canton, symbolically completing the transition to the new Indian Navy.

== Commanding officers ==
No.	Portrait	Name (born–died)	Term of office			Ref.
No.	Portrait	Name (born–died)	Took office	Left office	Time in office	Ref.
Commodore, Bombay Marine (1738-1739)
1		Commodore Bagwell	1738	1739	1 year	
Superintendent, Bombay Marine (1739-1830)
1		Charles Rigby Esq. (also Deputy Governor of Bombay)	1739			
2		Commodore Sir William James, 1st Baronet	1751	1754	3 years	
3		Captain Samuel Hough	1754	1772	18 years	
4		Commodore John Watson	1772	1774	2 years	
5		Captain Simon Matham	1774	1776	2 years	
6		Commodore George Emptage	1781	1785	4 years	
7		Captain Philip Dundas	1792	1801	9 years	
8		Captain Sir William Taylor Money	1801	1810	9 years	
9		Captain Henry Meriton	1813	1825	12 years	
10		Captain Thomas Buchanan	1825	1827	2 years	
11		Captain Sir Charles Malcolm CB	1827	1830	3 years	
Superintendent, Indian Navy (1830-1844)
1		Captain Sir Charles Malcolm CB	April 1830	10 January 1837	6 years, 284 days	
2		Rear-Admiral Sir Charles Malcolm CB	10 January 1837	July 1838	1 year, 172 days	
3		Captain Sir Robert Oliver	July 1838	October 1844	6 years, 83 days	
Officiating Superintendent, Indian Navy (1844-1845)
1		Captain John Pepper	October 1844	April 1845	182 days	
2		Acting Captain Henry Blosse Lynch	April 1845	December 1845	244 days	
Superintendent, Indian Navy (1845-1848)
1		Captain Sir Robert Oliver	December 1845	April 1848	2 years, 122 days	
Commander-in-Chief, Indian Navy (1848)
1		Commodore Sir Robert Oliver	April 1848	6 August 1848	127 days	
Officiating Superintendent, Indian Navy (1848-1849)
1		Captain Henry Blosse Lynch	6 August 1848	30 August 1848	24 days	
Superintendent, Indian Navy (1848-1849)
1		Captain John Croft Hawkins	31 August 1848	26 January 1849	148 days	
Superintendent & Commander-in-Chief, Indian Navy (1849–62)
1		Commodore Stephen Lushington	26 January 1849	March 1852	3 years, 35 days	
2		Commodore Henry John Leeke	March 1852	15 April 1854	2 years, 45 days	
3		Rear-Admiral Henry John Leeke	15 April 1854	July 1857	3 years, 77 days	
4		Commodore George Greville Wellesley	July 1857	July 1862	5 years	
Superintendent, Indian Navy (1862-1863))
1		Commodore John James Frushard	July 1862	April 1863	274 days	
Superintendent, Bombay Marine (1863-1874))
1		Captain John Wellington Young CB	April 1863	April 1868	5 years	
2		Captain G. F. Robinson	April 1868	September 1874	6 years	
Naval Adviser to Government of India (1874-1880)
1		Captain John Bythesea	5 August 1877	November 1880	3 years	
2		Rear-Admiral John Bythesea	1874	5 August 1877	3 years	
	Director, Her Majesty's Indian Marine (1882–83)					
1		Captain Harry Woodfall Brent	1883	1883	1 year	
Director of H.M.'s Indian Marine (1883–1892)
1		Captain John Hext	1883	1892	9 years	
Director of the Royal Indian Marine (1892–1928) (Note: The post was officially titled as Officiating Director R.I.M. from February to March 1898, then Director R.I.M. March 1898 to June 1917, and again Officiating Director R.I.M. June 1917 to September 1920 and back to Director R.I.M. until October 1929.)
1		Rear-Admiral Sir John Hext KCIE (1842-1924)	1892	February 1898	6 years	
2		Captain Walter Somerville Goodridge CIE (30 March 1849-2 April 1929)	5 March 1898	5 March 1904	6 years, 0 days	
3		Captain George Hayley Hewett CIE (30 November 1855-1930)	5 March 1904	17 March 1909	5 years, 12 days	
4	Walter Lumsden	Commodore Walter Lumsden CIE, CVO (16 April 1865-22 November 1947)	17 March 1909	12 June 1917	8 years, 87 days	
5		Captain Neville Frederick Jarvis Wilson CMG, CBE (1865-1947)	12 June 1917	27 August 1920	3 years, 76 days	
6		Rear-Admiral Henry Lancelot Mawbey CB, CVO (16 June 1870-4 June 1933)	28 August 1920	3 August 1922	1 year, 340 days	
7		Captain Sir Edward James Headlam CSI, CMG, DSO (1 May 1873-14 July 1943)	3 August 1922	4 October 1928	6 years, 62 days	
Flag Officer Commanding and Director, Royal Indian Marine (1928–1934)
1		Vice-Admiral Sir Humphrey T. Walwyn KCSI, CB, DSO (1879-1957)	5 October 1928	2 October 1934	5 years, 362 days	
Flag Officer Commanding, Royal Indian Navy (1934–1947)
1		Vice-Admiral Sir Humphrey T. Walwyn KCSI, CB, DSO (1879-1957)	2 October 1934	16 November 1934	45 days	
2		Vice-Admiral Arthur Bedford CB, CSI (1881-1949)	16 November 1934	23 November 1937	3 years, 7 days	
3		Vice-Admiral Sir Herbert Fitzherbert KCIE, CB, CMG (1885-1958)	23 November 1937	19 March 1943	5 years, 119 days	
4		Admiral John Henry Godfrey CB (1888-1970)	19 March 1943	15 March 1946	2 years, 361 days	
5		Vice-Admiral Sir Geoffrey Audley Miles KCB, KCSI (1890-1986)	15 March 1946	1 March 1947	351 days	
Commander-in-Chief, Royal Indian Navy (1947–1948)
1		Vice-Admiral Sir Geoffrey Audley Miles KCB, KCSI (1890-1986)	1 March 1947	14 August 1947	167 days	
2		Rear Admiral John Talbot Savignac Hall CIE (1896-1964)	15 August 1947	20 June 1948	310 days	
Chief of the Naval Staff and Commander-in-Chief, Royal Indian Navy (1948–1950)
1		Rear Admiral John Talbot Savignac Hall CIE (1896-1964)	21 June 1948	14 August 1948	54 days	
2		Vice Admiral Sir William Edward Parry KCB (1893-1972)	14 August 1948	25 January 1950	1 year, 164 days	

== Partition of ships, 1947 ==
Vessel types	India	Pakistan
Frigates	HMIS Tir; HMIS Khukri	HMPS Shamsher; HMPS Dhanush
Sloops	HMIS Sutlej; HMIS Jumna; HMIS Kistna; HMIS Cauvery	HMPS Narbada; HMPS Godavari; HMPS Hindustan
Corvettes	HMIS Assam
Minesweepers	HMIS Orissa; HMIS Deccan; HMIS Bihar; HMIS Kumaon; HMIS Rohilkhand; HMIS Khyber; HMIS Carnatic; HMIS Rajputana; HMIS Konkan; HMIS Bombay; HMIS Bengal; HMIS Madras	HMPS Kathiawar; HMPS Baluchistan; HMPS Oudh; HMPS Malwa; HMPS Punjab
Survey Vessels	HMIS Investigator
Trawlers	HMIS Nasik; HMIS Calcutta; HMIS Cochin; HMIS Amritsar; HMIS Shillong	HMPS Rampur; HMPS Baroda
Motor Minesweepers (MMS)	MMS 130; MMS 132; MMS 151; MMS 154	MMS 129; MMS 131
Motor Launches (ML)	ML 420
Harbour Defence Motor Launches (HDML)	HDML 1110; HDML 1112; HDML 1117; HDML 1118	HDML 1261; HDML 1262; HDML 1263; HDML 1266
Tankers	HMIS Chilka
Miscellaneous	All existing landing craft

== See also ==
- List of ships of the Royal Indian Navy
- List of ships of the Indian Navy
- Royal Indian Navy mutiny
- History of the Indian Navy
- British Indian Army
- Royal Indian Air Force
