= PS Harwich =

History
- Name: PS Harwich
- Operator: Great Eastern Railway
- Port of registry: (United Kingdom)
- Builder: Simpson and Company, London
- Launched: 1864
- Maiden voyage: 10 August 1864
- Out of service: 1907
- Fate: Scrapped 1907

General characteristics
- Tonnage: 750 gross register tons (GRT)
- Length: 215 feet (66 m)
- Beam: 27.1 feet (8.3 m)
- Depth: 17.7 feet (5.4 m)

PS Harwich was a freight vessel built for the Great Eastern Railway in 1864.

== History ==
The ship was built by Simpson and Company in London in 1864 as the first of an order of two vessels, the second being PS Rotterdam to be used to transport livestock from Rotterdam and Antwerp to Harwich. She was schooner rigged, with efficient masts, so as to have the ability to sail under emergencies. She made her maiden voyage on 10 August 1864 carrying 300 head of oxen and 600 sheep.

In 1884 she was converted to a twin-screw ship by Earle's Shipbuilding in Hull, and fitted with new boilers and compound engines.

She was sold in 1907 for scrapping.
