= SS Empire Bairn =

World War II merchant ship of the United Kingdom

History
- Name: SS Empire Bairn (1941–48)
- Owner: Ministry of War Transport (1941–44)
- Operator: Bulk Oil Steamship Co Ltd (1941–48)
- Port of registry: (United Kingdom) Glasgow (1941–48)
- Builder: Blythswood Shipbuilding Co Ltd, Glasgow
- Yard number: Yard 67
- Launched: 23 October 1941
- Completed: December 1941
- Identification: Official number 168702 (1941–48); Code Letters BCXD (1941–48)

History

India
- Name: HMIS Chilka
- Commissioned: 1948
- Renamed: INS Chilka, 26 January 1950
- Decommissioned: 1976
- Fate: Scrapped 1977

General characteristics
- Tonnage: 813 GRT
- Length: 193 ft (58.83 m)
- Beam: 30 ft 7 in (9.32 m)
- Depth: 13 ft 8 in (4.17 m)
- Propulsion: 1 x triple expansion steam engine (D Rowan & Co Ltd, Glasgow) 139 hp (104 kW)
- Speed: 9.5 knots (17.6 km/h)

Empire Bairn was an 813-ton coastal tanker built by Blythswood Shipbuilding Co Ltd, Glasgow in 1941 for the Ministry of War Transport (MoWT).

She spent the Second World War plying the Mediterranean Sea. Her uneventful wartime career is unusually well documented for a small cargo ship. After the war, she was sold to the Indian Navy in 1948 and commissioned as a harbour tanker HMIS Chilka, becoming INS Chilka when India became a republic in 1950. She was decommissioned in 1976 and was scrapped in 1977.

== Construction ==
Empire Bairn—"Bairn" means "child"—was built by Blythswood Shipbuilding Company Ltd, of Glasgow, as yard number 67. She was launched on 23 October 1941 and completed in December 1941. She was operated under the management of the Bulk Oil Steamship Co Ltd.

== War service ==
=== 1941–42 ===
After completion in December 1941, SS Empire Bairn would have undertaken sea trials. She is first recorded at Oban, Argyllshire in late December 1941. She took part in a number of convoys during the Second World War.

December – April

Empire Bairn was a member of Convoy WN 225 which sailed from Oban on 30 December 1941 and arrived at Methil, Fife on 2 January 1942. Empire Bairn was a member of Convoy EN 65 which sailed from Methil on 30 March 1942 and arrived at Oban on 1 April.

May

Empire Bairn is next recorded as being a member of Convoy BB 172 which sailed from Belfast Lough on 9 May and arrived at Milford Haven, Pembrokeshire the next day. She joined at Holyhead, Anglesey on 9 May and arrived at Avonmouth, Gloucestershire on 11 May.

June – July

Her movements for the next five weeks are unrecorded. Empire Bairn was a member of Convoy WN 299 which sailed from Loch Ewe on 21 June 1942 and arrived at Methil on 23 June. Her destination was Scapa Flow, Orkney Islands where she arrived on 22 June. Empire Bairn was a member of Convoy HM13 which sailed from Holyhead on 9 July 1942 and arrived at Milford Haven on 10 July. She then sailed to Swansea, West Glamorgan where she arrived later that day. Empire Bairn sailed from Swansea on 11 July to join Convoy WP 185 which sailed from Milford Haven that day and arrived at Portsmouth on 13 July. Her destination was Plymouth, Devon, she arrived on 12 July.

October 1942

Her movements until October 1942 are not recorded. In mid October she was sent to work in the Mediterranean Sea. Empire Bairn was a member of Convoy KX 2 which sailed from the Clyde on 18 October 1942 and arrived at Gibraltar on 29 October. Her movements until February 1943 are unrecorded.

=== 1943 ===
February

On 12 February, Empire Bairn was in Bône, Algeria. She was a member of Convoy ET 11X which sailed from Bône on that day and arrived at Oran, Algeria on 15 February. On 25 February she was again in Gibraltar. Empire Bairn was a member of Convoy TE 16 which sailed from Gibraltar on 26 February and arrived at Bône on 1 March.

March

Empire Bairn then sailed to Philippeville, Algeria and back to Bône 2 March, arrived back at Philippeville on 4 March and then to Algiers, arriving on 6 March. Empire Bairn then joined Convoy KMS 10G which had sailed from the Clyde on 26 February and arrived at Bône on 11 March. Empire Bairn was a member of Convoy ET 14 which sailed from Bône on 13 March and arrived at Gibraltar on 17 March. Her destination was Algiers, where she arrived on 15 March. On 19 March Empire Bairn joined Convoy TE 19 which had sailed from Gibraltar on 16 March and arrived at Bône on 20 March. Empire Bairn was a member of Convoy MKS 10 which sailed from Bône on 23 March and arrived at Liverpool on 5 April. She left the convoy at Algiers on 25 March. The following day Empire Bairn joined Convoy TE 19Y which had sailed from Gibraltar on 23 March and arrived at Bône on 27 March. Empire Bairn arrived at Philippeville and then back at Bône on 30 March, then was at Philippeville again on 31 March. She then sailed to Bougie, Algeria, arriving on 1 April.

April

She sailed from Bougie on 2 April and arrived at Algiers on 3 April. On 7 April Empire Bairn joined Convoy TE 20A which had sailed from Gibraltar on 5 April and arrived at Bône on 8 April. She left the convoy at Bougie on 9 April and then sailed to Philippeville. On 10 April she left Philippeville and arrived at Bône on 11 April. She departed Bône on 15 April and arrived at Algiers on 17 April. On 21 April Empire Bairn joined Convoy UGS 7 which had sailed from Hampton Roads on 1 April 1943 and arrived at Bône on 22 April. On 27 April Empire Bairn joined Convoy ET 19 which arrived at Gibraltar on 2 May. She left the convoy at Algiers on 29 April.

May

On 6 May Empire Bairn sailed for Philippeville, arriving the next day. On 10 May Empire Bairn joined Convoy ET20 which had sailed from Bône on 9 May and arrived at Gibraltar on 14 May. She left the convoy at Algiers on 11 May. On 17 May she was at Bougie, arriving at Algiers later that day.

June – October

Her next recorded movement was arriving at Algiers on 19 June and sailing from Bougie later that day. On 24 June Empire Bairn joined Convoy GTX 3 at Algiers The convoy had sailed from Gibraltar on 21 June 1943 and arrived at Port Said on [4 July. She left the convoy at Malta on 28 June. Empire Bairn was a member of Convoy MKS 16A which sailed from Tripoli, Libya on 29 June and arrived at Gibraltar on 6 July. She left the convoy at Bizerta, Algeria on 1 July. From July to October, her movements are unrecorded except that she was in port at Bizerta from 20 to 23 July, 3 August to 3 September and 24 September to 7 October.

October

On 7 October, Empire Bairn joined Convoy KMS 28 which had sailed from Gibraltar on 7 October and arrived at Port Said on 19 October. Her destination is unrecorded but she arrived back at Bizerta on 12 October.

November

Empire Bairn was a member of Convoy NV 7 which sailed from Naples, Italy on 3 November 1943 and arrived at Augusta, Italy on 5 November. Empire Bairn was a member of Convoy AH 8 which sailed Augusta from on 8 November and arrived at Bari, on 10 November. She left the convoy at Taranto, Italy on 9 November.

December

On 14 December Empire Bairn joined Convoy HA 12 which had sailed from Bari on that day and arrived at Augusta on 16 December. Later that day, she joined convoy MKS 34 which had sailed from Port Said on 11 December and arrived at Gibraltar on 24 December. She left the convoy at Algiers on 20 December. On 24 December Empire Bairn joined Convoy KMS 35 which had sailed from Gibraltar on 22 December and arrived at Port Said on 1 January 1944. Empire Bairn joined the convoy at Algiers and left at Augusta. She left the convoy on 28 December at Augusta. On 31 December Empire Bairn joined Convoy GUS 26 which had sailed from Port Said, Egypt on 26 December and arrived at Hampton Roads, Virginia on 24 January 1944. She put into Malta after becoming a straggler, arriving on 1 January 1944.

=== 1944 ===
January

On 5 January Empire Bairn joined Convoy MKS 36 which had sailed from Port Said on 31 December 1943 and arrived at Gibraltar on 12 January 1944. She left at Bizerta on 8 January. Her next recorded movements are sailing from Bizerta on 17 January and arriving back on 21 January. She then sailed from Bizerta on 22 January and arrived at Naples on 24 January.

February

Empire Bairn was a member of Convoy NV 22 which sailed from Naples on 22 February and arrived at Augusta on 23 February. On 23 February Empire Bairn joined Convoy MKS 41 which had sailed from Port Said on 19 February and arrived at Gibraltar on 2 March. She left at Bizerta on 27 February.

March

Her next recorded movement was sailing from Augusta on 20 March and arriving back there on 23 March. On 25 March, Empire Bairn joined Convoy MKS 44 which had sailed from Port Said on 20 March 1944 and arrived at Gibraltar on 1 April. She left at Bizerta on 28 March. She sailed from Bizerta on 31 March and arrived at Bône on 1 April.

April – May

On 7 April, Empire Bairn joined Convoy MKS 45 which had sailed from Port Said on 30 March 1944 and rendezvoused with Convoy SL 154 on 11 April. She left at Algiers on 8 April. On 11 April, Empire Bairn joined Convoy UGS 37 which had sailed from Hampton Roads on 24 March and arrived at Port Said on 19 April. She left at Bône on 13 April. On 17 April Empire Bairn joined Convoy MKS 46 which had sailed from Port Said on 9 April and arrived at Gibraltar on 21 April. She left at Algiers on 19 April. Empire Bairn sailed from Algiers on 22 April and arrived at Bône on 23 April. On 28 April Empire Bairn joined Convoy KMS 48 which had sailed from Gibraltar on 25 April and arrived at Port Said on 1 May. She left the convoy at Augusta on 1 May. On 4 May Empire Bairn joined Convoy MKS 48 which had sailed from Port Said on 29 April and arrived at Gibraltar on 10 May. She left at Bizerta on 6 May.

September

Her movements are unrecorded until she left Bizerta on 24 September and was escorted to La Maddalena, Sardinia, where she arrived on 26 September. No further movements are recorded until May 1945.

=== 1945 ===
May – August

In 1945, Empire Bairn was sent to India. She is recorded as sailing from Naples on 7 May, arriving at Piraeus, Greece on 11 May. Sailing on 18 May and arriving at Port Said on 21 May. She sailed from Suez, Egypt on 27 June and arrived at Aden, Aden Settlement on 3 July. She sailed from Aden on 5 July and arrived at Bombay, India on 13 July. After almost a month in port, she sailed from Bombay on 11 August, and arrived at Colombo, Ceylon on 15 August. She sailed later that day for Trincomalee, Ceylon arriving on 17 August. She sailed from Trincomalee on 18 August, arriving at Madras, India on 20 August.

== Postwar ==
In 1948, Empire Bairn was sold to the Indian Navy and renamed HMIS Chilka, becoming INS Chilka when India gained independence from the United Kingdom in 1950. She was used as a harbour tanker. Chilka was removed from the list of Indian Navy ships in 1976 and scrapped in 1977.

== Official number and code letters ==
Official Numbers were a forerunner to IMO Numbers.

Empire Bairn had the UK official number 168968 and used the code letters BCXD.
