= HMIS Baluchistan =

Minesweeper

History

India
- Name: Baluchistan
- Ordered: 20 December 1939
- Builder: Blyth Shipbuilding Company
- Laid down: 28 July 1941
- Launched: 11 May 1942
- Commissioned: 28 October 1942
- Out of service: 1948
- Fate: Transferred to Pakistan

Pakistan
- Name: Baluchistan
- Acquired: 1948
- Fate: Scrapped 1959

General characteristics
- Class & type: Bangor-class minesweeper
- Displacement: 656 long tons (667 t) standard; 820 long tons (833 t) full
- Length: 174 ft (53 m) o/a
- Beam: 28 ft 6 in (8.69 m)
- Draught: 10 ft 3 in (3.12 m)
- Installed power: 2,000 ihp (1,500 kW); 2 × Admiralty 3-drum boilers
- Propulsion: 2 shafts; 2 steam turbines
- Speed: 16 knots (30 km/h; 18 mph)
- Range: 2,800 nmi (5,200 km; 3,200 mi) at 10 knots (19 km/h; 12 mph)
- Complement: 60
- Armament: 1 × single 12 pounder 3-inch (76 mm) anti-aircraft gun; 1 × single QF 2-pounder (4 cm) AA gun

HMIS Baluchistan (J182) was a Bangor-class minesweeper built for the Royal Navy, but transferred to the Royal Indian Navy (RIN) during the Second World War.

== Design and description ==
The Bangor class was designed as a small minesweeper that could be easily built in large numbers by civilian shipyards; as steam turbines were difficult to manufacture, the ships were designed to accept a wide variety of engines. Baluchistan displaced 656 long tons (667 t) at standard load and 820 long tons (830 t) at deep load. The ship had an overall length of 174 feet (53.0 m), a beam of 28 feet 6 inches (8.7 m) and a draught of 10 feet 3 inches (3.1 m). The ship's complement consisted of 60 officers and ratings.

She was powered by two Parsons geared steam turbines, each driving one shaft, using steam provided by two Admiralty three-drum boilers. The engines produced a total of 2,000 shaft horsepower (1,500 kW) and gave a maximum speed of 16 knots (30 km/h; 18 mph). Baluchistan carried a maximum of 160 long tons (163 t) of fuel oil that gave her a range of 2,800 nautical miles (5,200 km; 3,200 mi) at 10 knots (19 km/h; 12 mph).

The turbine-powered Bangors were armed with a 12-pounder 3-inch (76 mm) anti-aircraft gun and a single QF 2-pounder (4 cm) AA gun. In some ships the 2-pounder was replaced a single or twin 20 mm Oerlikon AA gun, while most ships were fitted with four additional single Oerlikon mounts over the course of the war. For escort work, her minesweeping gear could be exchanged for around 40 depth charges.

== Construction and career ==
HMIS Baluchistan was originally ordered from the Blyth Shipbuilding Company for the Royal Navy as HMS Greenock in 1939. However, before she was launched, she was transferred to the Royal Indian Navy and eventually commissioned as Baluchistan. She served in the RIN during World War II. Baluchistan was a part of the Eastern Fleet, and escorted numerous convoys between Africa, British India and Australia in 1943–45.

After the independence, she was among the vessels transferred to Pakistan, where she was renamed PNS Baluchistan.

== Bibliography ==
- Chesneau, Roger, ed. (1980). Conway's All the World's Fighting Ships 1922–1946. Greenwich, UK: Conway Maritime Press. ISBN 0-85177-146-7.
- Colledge, J. J.; Warlow, Ben (2006) [1969]. Ships of the Royal Navy: The Complete Record of All Fighting Ships of the Royal Navy from the 15th Century to the Present (3rd Rev ed.). London: Chatham Publishing. ISBN 978-1-86176-281-8. OCLC 67375475.
- Lenton, H. T. (1998). British & Empire Warships of the Second World War. Annapolis, Maryland: Naval Institute Press. ISBN 1-55750-048-7.
