= HMIS Bombay (J249) =

Bathurst-class corvette

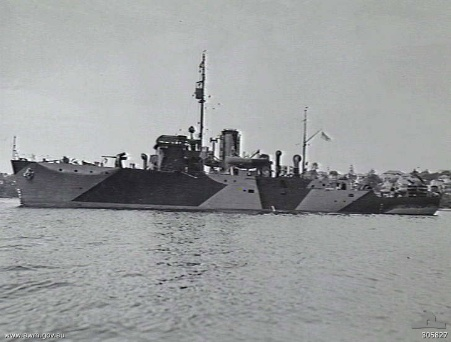
- HMIS Bombay in Sydney Harbour in 1942

History

India
- Name: Bombay
- Namesake: City of Bombay (Mumbai), India
- Builder: Mort's Dock and Engineering Co Ltd, Sydney
- Laid down: 19 July 1941
- Launched: 6 December 1941
- Commissioned: 24 April 1942
- Decommissioned: 1960
- Fate: Broken up for scrap

General characteristics
- Class & type: Bathurst-class corvette
- Displacement: 733 tons
- Length: 189 ft (58 m)
- Beam: 32 ft (9.8 m)
- Draught: 8.5 ft (2.6 m)
- Propulsion: Triple expansion, 2 shafts
- Speed: 15.5 knots (28.7 km/h)
- Complement: 85
- Armament: Standard class armament: 1 × 4 inch Mk XIX gun, 3 × 20 mm Oerlikon 20 mm cannons, machine guns, depth charge chutes and throwers

HMIS Bombay (J249), later INS Bombay, named for the city of Bombay (now Mumbai) in India, was one of 60 Bathurst-class corvettes constructed during World War II and one of four operated by the Royal Indian Navy.

== History ==
Bombay was laid down by Morts Dock & Engineering Co in Sydney, Australia on 19 July 1941. She was launched on 6 December 1941, and commissioned on 24 April 1942.

=== World War II ===
HMIS Bombay was based in Sydney from the time of commissioning until September 1942. As such, she was present in Sydney Harbour during the Japanese midget submarine operation on 31 May – 1 June 1942. In September 1942 Bombay left Sydney for Colombo. While based at ports in British India, Bombay was responsible for escorting convoys between India and the Persian Gulf. In April 1945 Bombay operated in support of Operation Dracula.

=== Post-war ===
After India became a republic on 26 January 1950, the vessel was renamed as the Indian Navy's INS Bombay.

Bombay was decommissioned in 1960. She was sold for scrap in 1961, and broken up in 1962.

HMIS Bombay is recognised as the fifteenth ship (and ninth warship) in Indian maritime history to bear the name Bombay. INS Mumbai is considered to be Bombay's successor, following the name-change of India's largest city.
