= HMIS Rajputana =

History

India
- Name: Rajputana
- Ordered: 24 August 1940
- Builder: Lobnitz & Co.
- Laid down: 21 June 1941
- Launched: 31 December 1941
- Commissioned: 30 April 1942
- Decommissioned: 1961
- Fate: Scrapped 1961

General characteristics
- Class & type: Bangor-class minesweeper
- Displacement: 673 long tons (684 t) standard; 860 long tons (874 t) full
- Length: 189 ft (58 m) o/a
- Beam: 28 ft 6 in (8.69 m)
- Draught: 10 ft 6 in (3.20 m)
- Installed power: 2,400 ihp (1,800 kW); 2 × Admiralty 3-drum boilers
- Propulsion: 2 shafts; 2 vertical triple-expansion steam engines
- Speed: 16 knots (30 km/h; 18 mph)
- Range: 2,800 nmi (5,200 km; 3,200 mi) at 10 knots (19 km/h; 12 mph)
- Complement: 60
- Armament: 1 × single 12-pounder 3-inch (76 mm) anti-aircraft gun; 1 × single QF 2-pounder (4 cm) AA gun or; 1 × quadruple Vickers .50 machine gun

HMIS Rajputana (J197) was a Bangor-class minesweeper built for the Royal Navy. She was transferred to the Royal Indian Navy (RIN) during the Second World War.

== Design and description ==
The Bangor class was designed as a small minesweeper that could be easily built in large numbers by civilian shipyards; as steam turbines were difficult to manufacture, the ships were designed to accept a wide variety of engines. Rajputana displaced 673 long tons (684 t) at standard load and 860 long tons (870 t) at deep load. The ship had an overall length of 189 feet (57.6 m), a beam of 28 feet 6 inches (8.7 m) and a draught of 10 feet 6 inches (3.2 m). The ship's complement consisted of 60 officers and ratings.

She was powered by two vertical triple-expansion steam engines (VTE), each driving one shaft, using steam provided by two Admiralty three-drum boilers. The engines produced a total of 2,400 shaft horsepower (1,800 kW) and gave a maximum speed of 16 knots (30 km/h; 18 mph). The ship carried a maximum of 160 long tons (163 t) of fuel oil that gave her a range of 2,800 nautical miles (5,200 km; 3,200 mi) at 10 knots (19 km/h; 12 mph).

The VTE-powered Bangors were armed with a 12-pounder 3-inch (76 mm) anti-aircraft gun and a single QF 2-pounder (4 cm) AA gun or a quadruple mount for the Vickers .50 machine gun. In some ships the 2-pounder was replaced a single or twin 20 mm Oerlikon AA gun, while most ships were fitted with four additional single Oerlikon mounts over the course of the war. For escort work, their minesweeping gear could be exchanged for around 40 depth charges.

== Construction and career ==
HMIS Rajputana was ordered from Lobnitz & Co. originally for the Royal Navy as HMS Lyme Regis in 1940. However, before she was launched, she was transferred to the Royal Indian Navy and eventually commissioned as Rajputana. She was a part of the Eastern Fleet, and escorted numerous convoys between Africa, British India and Australia in 1943-45. She took part in Operation Dracula, the invasion of Rangoon, in May 1945, and in September 1945, carried out minesweeping operations off Singapore prior to the formal surrender of Japanese forces in South East Asia.

=== Post-war service ===
In 1947, the Partition of India resulted in the Royal Indian Navy being split between India and Pakistan. Of eight Bangor-class minesweepers in the pre-partition navy, four were transferred to Pakistan. Rajputana was one of the four that remained in the Royal Indian Navy, which was renamed the Indian Navy in 1950.

== Bibliography ==
- Chesneau, Roger, ed. (1980). Conway's All the World's Fighting Ships 1922–1946. Greenwich, UK: Conway Maritime Press. ISBN 0-85177-146-7.
- Colledge, J. J.; Warlow, Ben (2006) [1969]. Ships of the Royal Navy: The Complete Record of All Fighting Ships of the Royal Navy from the 15th Century to the Present (3rd Rev ed.). London: Chatham Publishing. ISBN 978-1-86176-281-8. OCLC 67375475.
- Collins, J.T.E. (1964). The Royal Indian Navy, 1939–1945. Official History of the Indian Armed Forces In the Second World War. New Delhi, India: Combined Inter-Services Historical Section (India & Pakistan).
- Gardiner, Robert; Chumbley, Stephen, eds. (1995). Conway's All The World's Fighting Ships 1947–1995. Annapolis, Maryland, USA: Naval Institute Press. ISBN 1-55750-132-7.
- Lenton, H. T. (1998). British & Empire Warships of the Second World War. Annapolis, Maryland: Naval Institute Press. ISBN 1-55750-048-7.
- Lenton, H.T.; Colledge, J.J. (1973). Warships of World War II. London: Ian Allan. ISBN 0-7110-0403-X.
