= U95 =

U95 may refer to:

- German submarine U-95, various vessels
- HMIS Sutlej (U95), a sloop of the Royal Indian Navy
- Small nucleolar RNA SNORD95
