= Afzal Ahsan Randhawa =

Pakistani writer, translator and politician

Muhammad Afzal Ahsan Randhawa
- محمد افضل احسن رندھاوا

Member of National Assembly
- In office 1972–1977
- Constituency: NA-49 (Lyallpur)

Personal details
- Born: 1 September 1937 Amritsar, Punjab, British India
- Died: 18 September 2017 (aged 80) Faisalabad, Punjab, Pakistan
- Resting place: Qaim Sain Graveyard, Faisalabad
- Party: Pakistan Peoples Party
- Spouse: Ayesha Randhawa.
- Education: Murray College; LL.B., Punjab University Law College
- Occupation: Writer, poet, translator, playwright, politician
- Profession: Lawyer
- Awards: Pride of Performance Award by the President of Pakistan in 1996; Kamal-e-Fun (Lifetime Achievement Award) by Pakistan Academy of Letters in 2013

Muhammad Afzal Ahsan Randhawa (Punjab, Urdu: محمد افضل احسن رندھاوا) (September 1937 – 18 September 2017) was a Pakistani Punjabi language writer, poet, translator, playwright and a politician.

He authored several short stories and novels in the Punjabi language including Sooraj Grehan and Doaba.

== Early and personal life ==
Muhammad Afzal Ahsan Randhawa was born in Amritsar, Punjab, British India (now Punjab, India) on 1 September 1937. He belonged to a Randhawa Jat family.

Randhawa grew up in a rural part of the Sialkot district in Pakistan, where he was the editor of the magazine of the Mission High School.

He graduated from Murray College in Sialkot. As a student, he used to be published in Daily Imroze and weekly Lail-o-Nahar. Later, he enrolled in the Punjab University Law College. He was the editor of the law college magazine Al-Meezan.

He had a love marriage with his wife Ayesha Randhawa (d. 2016), who taught at the University of Agriculture in Faisalabad. They had four children: one son and three daughters.

== Literary career ==
In 1996, the President of Pakistan conferred the Pride of Performance award to him.

Randhawa participated as a guest or a panelist at literature festivals and writing conferences in Pakistan.

Aitzaz Ahsan a lawyer, in his 1996 book (reprinted in 2005) The Indus Saga, quoted six verses of Randhawa's poem to depict the Indus man.

In 2014, Randhawa was interviewed by Masood Malhi of Special Broadcasting Service.

In 2015, the Pakistan Academy of Letters announced the 2013 Kamal-e-Fun Award, the highest literary award, would be presented to Randhawa along with a ₨. 1,000,000 prize money.

In 2016, Randhawa opened the Lyallpur Sulekh Mela (Lyallpur Literary Festival) held in the Faisalabad Arts Council in Faisalabad.

== Political career ==
Outside literature, Randhawa was a left leaning politician and a lawyer.

In 1972, in a by-election he won the NA-49 seat in Lyallpur (now Faisalabad) for the National Assembly on Pakistan Peoples Party's ticket. He contributed to the framing of the 1973 Constitution of Pakistan.

In 1977, during the martial law of General Zia ul Haq was disqualified from taking part in politics for seven years by the 'military courts' and later in 1981, he was detained for 'living beyond his means'.

== Books ==
In Punjabi, Randhawa wrote four novels, four collections of short stories, six collections of poetry, one collection of TV and radio dramas and three translated versions of an African novel, one collection of African poetry and one translation of interviews of world leaders. He also wrote a collection of Urdu poetry.

=== Novels ===
His literary career began in 1961 with the publication of Deeva tey Darya, his first novel. It became the first book by a Pakistani to be published in India. He was awarded the Adamjee Literary Award for 1961–62 by the Pakistan Writers' Guild for his novelette Deeva tey Darya and for his second Punjabi novel Doaba in 1981–82. Randhawa's novel Sooraj Grehan published in 1984, is an exchange of letters between two lovers. His fourth novel Pundh was published in 2001.

=== Poetry and short stories ===
In 1965, he published a collection of poetry Sheesha Aik Lashkaray Dou; followed by a collection of short stories Runn, Talwar Tay Ghora published in 1973. Other short story collections, include Randhawa Dian Kahanian in 1988, Munna Koh Lahore in 1989 and Illahi Mohar in 2013.

Randhawa's further five poetry collections, include Raat Daay Char Safar in 1975; Punjab Di Var in 1979; Mitti Di Mehek in 1983; Piyali Wich Aasmaan in 1983; and Chhewaan Darya in 1997.

In 2011, his collection of short stories Elahi Mohr Tey Doojian Kahanian was published.

=== Translations ===
He also translated Chinua Achebe's Things Fall Apart as Tutt Bhaj (1986) and Gabriel García Márquez's Chronicle of a Death Foretold as Maut Da Roznamcha (1993) into Punjabi.

== Death and legacy ==
On the evening of 18 September 2017, Randhawa died in Faisalabad, Pakistan, seventeen days after his 80th birthday. He was buried next to his son and wife in Qaim Sain Graveyard in Ghulam Muhammad Abad, Faisalabad on 20 September.

On his death, Fakhar Zaman, chairman of the World Punjabi Congress, said that "his poetry and short stories were equally trend setters and undoubtedly he was one of the very few writers who were equally popular in Pakistan and India".

=== Among Sikhs in India ===
Randhawa's works have been transliterated into Gurmukhi script and published in the Indian Punjab.

Randhawa was popular among Sikhs as he opposed the 1984 Indian military Operation Bluestar on the Golden Temple. He also wrote a poem about it, Navan Ghallughara (new Holocaust), glorifying Jarnail Singh Bhindranwale as a great warrior.

In 1986, Randhawa was awarded the Prof. Piara Singh Gill & Karam Singh Sandhu Memorial Antar-Rashtari Shiromani Sahitkaar/Kalakaar Award by the International Association of Punjabi Authors and Artists.

In 1999, he was bestowed upon with Kartar Singh Dhaliwal award by the Punjabi Sahit Akademi, Ludhiana.

== Awards and recognition ==
- Pride of Performance Award by the President of Pakistan in 1996.
- Kamal-e-Fun Award (Lifetime Achievement Award) by Pakistan Academy of Letters for his literary work in 2013.
