= Asad Muhammad Khan =

Pakistani novelist, playwright, songwriter

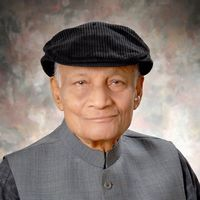
- Asad Muhammad Khan
- Born: 26 September 1932 (age 93); Bhopal, British India
- Education: Sindh Muslim Government Arts & Commerce College, Karachi
- Occupations: Novelist, playwright, and poet
- Years active: 1973–present
- Awards: Tamgha-e-Imtiaz (2009) Kamal-e-Fun Award (2019)

Asad Muhammad Khan (born 26 September 1932) is a Pakistani novelist, playwright, songwriter, and poet. He is the author of five Urdu story books. He wrote songs, plays and features for Radio Pakistan and PTV. He received the Tamgha-e-Imtiaz award in 2009.

== Early life and education ==
Khan was born on 26 September 1932 in Bhopal, British India . In 1950, he migrated to Pakistan and settled first in Lahore and then permanently in Karachi. He completed his secondary school education in Bhopal in 1949. Later, he graduated from Sindh Muslim Government Arts & Commerce College, Karachi.

== Literary career ==
Khan has authored nine collections of short stories and a handful of television plays. His first book, "Khhirki Bhar Aasman" was published in 1982. His book "The Harvest of Anger and Other Stories", a collection of his short stories, has been published in English translation, in 2002. Though he wrote his first fictional work, Basauday ki Maryam, a little later in his career, it is regarded one of his best works to date.

He has penned lyrics for some popular songs for Radio Pakistan and PTV like, "Zameen ki goud rang se umang se bhari rahay", "Anokha ladla khelan ko mangay chaand", "Tum sung nainan laagay" and others.

== Books ==
- 1982 - Khhirki Bhar Aasman (Stories and Poems)
- 1990 - Burj e Khamoshan (Stories)
- 1997 - Rukay Hue Sawan (songs)
- 1997 - Ghussay Ki Nai Fasal (stories)
- 2002 - The Harvest of Anger and Other Stories (English translation of 21 stories)
- 2003 - Narbada Aur Dosri Kahaniyan (Stories)
- 2005 - Jo Kahaniyan Likhein
- 2006 - Teesray Pehar Ki Kahaniyan (stories)
- 2010 - Aik Tukra Dhoop Ka (12 fictional stories)
- 2016 - Tukron Mein Kahi Gayi Kahaniyan (Fiction)

== Songs ==
- Anokha Ladla Khelan Ko Maangay Chaand, sung by Bilqees Khanum
- Zameen Ki Goud Rang Se Umang Se Bhari Rahay, sung by Muhammad Ifrahim
- Tum Sung Nainan Laagay, sung by Rubina Badar

== Awards and recognitions ==
Khan received following awards during his literary career:

- 2003 - National Literary Award by Pakistan Academy of Letters
- 2004 - Ahmad Nadeem Qasmi Award for Fiction Pakistan
- 2007 - Majlas e Faroogh e Adab Award, Doha, Qatar
- 2009 - Tamgha-e-Imtiaz
- 2019 - Kamal-e-Fun Award by Pakistan Academy of Letters
- 2019 - Life Time Achievement Award by the Arts Council of Pakistan, Karachi
