= Kamal-e-Fun Award =

Pakistani annual literary award

- Awarded for: Literary services
- Location: Islamabad
- Country: Pakistan
- Presented by: Pakistan Academy of Letters
- First award: 1997
- Website: pal.gov.pk

Kamal-e-Fun Award (Urdu: کمالِ فن ایوارڈ) is a lifetime achievement literary award presented annually by Pakistan Academy of Letters (PAL). The award was set up in 1997 and is given to Pakistani scholars for their entire literary career. The winner receives Rs. 10,00,000.

== Recipients ==
Year	Photo	Awardee	Genre(s)	Ref.
1997		Ahmad Nadeem Qasmi	Poetry and fiction	
1998		Intizar Hussain	Novel	
1999		Mushtaq Ahmad Yusufi	Humor	
2000		Ahmad Faraz	Poetry	
2001		Shaukat Siddiqui	Novel and drama	
2002		Munir Niazi	Poetry	
2003		Ada Jafri	Poetry	
2004		Sobho Gianchandani	Revolutionary writing	
2005		Nabi Bakhsh Baloch	Research and linguistics	
2006		Jamiluddin Aali	Research, poetry and travel writing	
2007		Ajmal Khattak	Poetry	
2008		Abdullah Jan Jamaldini	Authorship	
2009		Lutfullah Khan	Authorship and travel writing	
2010		Bano Qudsia	Novel and fiction	
2011		Muhammad Ibrahim Joyo	Research writing	
2012		Abdullah Hussain	Novel	
2013		Afzal Ahsan Randhawa	Novel	
2014		Fahmida Riaz	Novel and poetry	
2015		Kishwar Naheed	Poetry	
2016		Amar Jaleel	Fiction and column writing	
2017		Jamil Jalibi	Linguistics and literary criticism	
2018		Muneer Ahmed Badini	Novel	
2019		Asad Muhammad Khan	Novel and poetry	
2020		Mustansar Hussain Tarar Ashu Lal Faqeer	Novel, poetry and travel writing	
2021		Zafar Iqbal	Poetry	
2022		Hasan Manzar	Novels and short stories	
2023		Iftikhar Arif	Poetry	
2024		Ata ul Haq Qasmi	Poetry and prose	
2025		Abdur Rehman Brahui	Poetry and prose	

== See also ==
- Pakistan Academy of Letters
