= Fakhar Zaman (poet) =

Pakistani poet

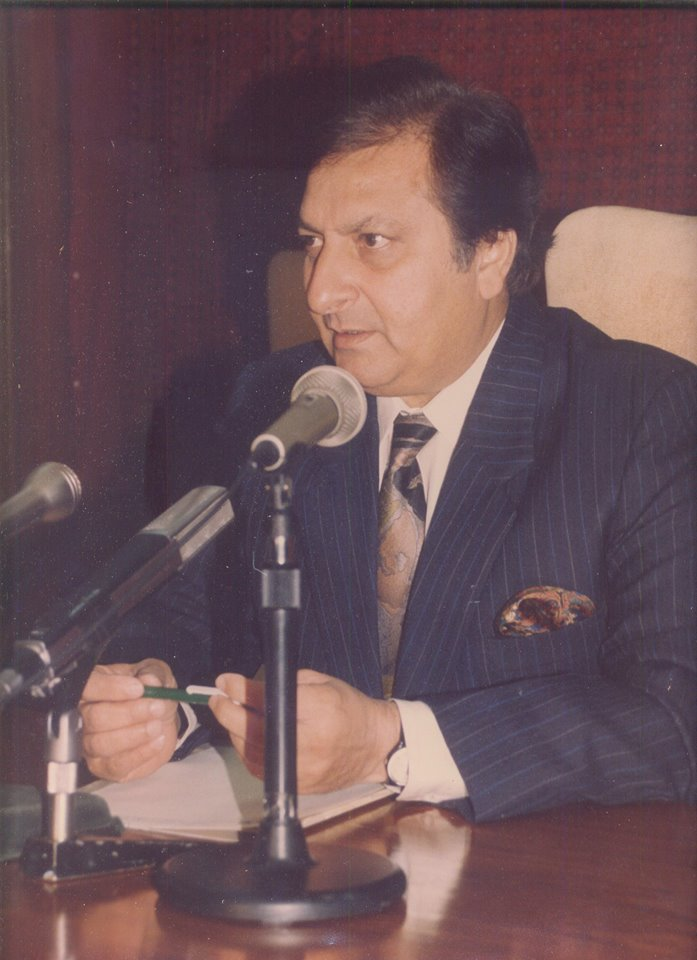
- Fakhar Zaman addressing press conference on the eve of International Conference of Writers, Artists and Intellectuals in Islamabad, Pakistan
- Born: Fakhar Zaman; 1943 (age 82–83); Gujrat, Punjab Province, British India
- Education: University of Punjab
- Occupation: Ex-chairman Pakistan Academy of Letters
- Writing career
- Genres: Poet, Playwright, Novelist
- Notable works: The Prisoner, The Lost Seven, Deadman's Tale, The Alien Bewafa, The Low Born
- Notable awards: Sitara-e-Imtiaz-1994; Millennium Award; Hilal-e-Imtiaz-2008; Shiromani Sahitik Award; Punjab Ratan Award
- Website: Pakistan Academy of Letters; World Punjabi Congress

Fakhar Zaman (Urdu: فخر زمان) was the chairman of the Pakistan Academy of Letters from 11 May 2008 to 12 March 2012, when Abdul Hameed succeeded him. A leader of the Pakistan Peoples Party (PPP) and the chairman of the World Punjabi Congress, he has also been playing a notable role in politics to achieve his sociopolitical ideals.

He is a celebrated Pakistani writer who is author of 40 books in Punjabi, Urdu and English. His Punjabi novels and poetry have been translated into several major languages of the world and are taught at post-graduate level in different countries for students seeking PhD and M.Phil degrees. Thesis have been written on his Punjabi writings in India. Five of his Punjabi books including his modern classic novel "Bandiwan" (The Prisoner), were banned, forcibly lifted from book stores and burned publicly by the military government in 1978 and after a long drawn litigation, the ban was lifted after 18 years.

He has received several international and national awards including the Hilal-e-Imtiaz and Sitara-e-Imtiaz awards by the Pakistan government, Shiromani Sahitak Award from the Indian government and the Millennium Award for Best Punjabi Novelist of the 20th century.

Fakhar Zaman has been a Minister in Benazir Bhutto's government, a senator and two-time Chairman of the Pakistan Academy of Letters. Presently he is the Chairman of World Punjabi Congress and International Sufi Council.

== Early life ==
Fakhar Zaman was born in Gujrat, Punjab in a Jatt family. His father, Major Muhammad Zaman was a known social and political figure of Punjab of his time. He was educated in Mission High School, Gujrat and did his BA degree from The Zamindar College, Gujrat. After doing his masters degree in social works and a degree in Law, Post Graduate Diploma in International Affairs, he spent some time in Netherlands where he did post graduate studies in Social Welfare and International Relations and obtained certificate in International Law from the International Court of Justice.

He published and edited a monthly English magazine namely "The Voice" which was folded by Ayub Khan’s military regime. Subsequently he edited a monthly Urdu magazine "Bazgasht" which was also banned during Zia-ul-Haq period. His Punjabi weekly "Wangaar" was also banned by the military regime.

== Political career ==
Fakhar Zaman joined the PPP of Zulfiqar Ali Bhutto in 1970. He served as honorary political adviser to Begum Nusrat Bhutto from 1973 to 1977 and was elected Senator in 1977. He was appointed President of the Cultural wing of PPP by Mohtarma Benazir Bhutto in 1984. He was appointed Vice President of PPP (Punjab) from 1987 to 1989 and President of PPP (Punjab) during 1989–1993 period. He has been on the Central Executive Committee of PPP in the past. He was President of PPP Policy and Planning Committee (Punjab) from 1996 to 2002. He was appointed chairman, National Commission on History and Culture (1993–96) and chairman, Pakistan Academy of Letters and Minister for Culture during the same period. Then he was again appointed chairman, PAL from 2008 to 2011.

== Minister of Culture ==
Fakhar Zaman attended UNESCO conferences in Paris during this period. He was the architect of first ever Cultural Policy of Pakistan promulgated in 1995.

== Post-Martial Law ==
Fakhar Zaman's five books were banned by the Military Regime of General Zia-UL-Haq, forcibly lifted from the book shops and burnt publicly. After a litigation of 18 years, the ban was lifted by Lahore High Court in 1996.

In 1984, he spent a few months in Stockholm University, Sweden attending seminars and lecturing on social sciences. He writes in Urdu, Punjabi and English language and till date has authored nearly 40 books. He was in Jail for months during the martial law period where he started writing his famous Punjabi novel "Bandiwan" translated into English as "The Prisoner" and published by UNESCO and Peter Owen of London. His Punjabi writings have been translated into major languages in the world and are taught at post-graduate level in Pakistan, India and some foreign countries. A number of PhD and M-Phil theses have been written on his Punjabi novels and poetry in India.

== Assassination of Benazir Bhutto ==
When Mohtarma Benazir Bhutto was assassinated on 27 December 2007, he was in Vienna, Austria. When he took over as chairman Pakistan Academy of Letters in 2008, he published a number of books on the life and thoughts of 'Mohtarma Benazir Bhutto Shaheed'. The history of PPP and the chronological events since the foundation of the party in 1967 has been written by Fakhar Zaman on the website of PPP.

== Chairman Academy of Letters ==
During his chairmanship of Pakistan Academy of Letters (11 May 2008 – 12 March 2012), he produced fourteen documentaries in English on the Sufi poets of Pakistan of about 40 minutes duration each. The documentaries were appreciated nationally and internationally. They were directed by Fakhar Zaman who had a background of film and TV studies from a Canadian university. There was a Pakistan Television Corporation (PTV) produced TV show in Urdu titled Hamarey Sufi Shoraa about the life and times of Pakistani Sufi poets that also aired and it was hosted by Fakhar Zaman.

== World Punjabi Congress ==
World Punjabi Congress (WPC) was established in 1985. Since its inception, Fakhar Zaman served as its chairman, and he has been the Chairman of International Sufi Council since 2010. WPC has organized 30 international conferences on language, literature, culture and peace in Pakistan, India, Austria, France, Netherlands, UK, Sweden, Denmark, Norway, Estonia, Canada and the US. During 2015, WPC and ISC (International Sufi Council) organized 12 national conferences on Sufi Poets from the four provinces of Pakistan.

== Punjabi Language Movements ==
Fakhar Zaman has been associated with the Punjabi language and culture movements since his university days and has struggled vehemently to get Punjabi language a rightful place in the province of Punjab. Despite his and his colleagues relentless efforts, the present government of Punjab of Pakistan Muslim League (N) has miserably failed to promote the Punjabi language in cahoots with anti-Punjabi elitist bureaucracy of Punjab.

== Books ==
Five of his Punjabi books were banned by Martial Law regime in 1978. Ban was lifted by Lahore High Court in 1996 i.e. after 18-years, a solitary case in the history of world literature. His books are taught at postgraduate level in many Universities of the world. A number of PhD & M.Phil. theses have been written on his Punjabi writings. He has been editing and publishing an English monthly "Voice" Urdu monthly "Bazgasht", Punjabi weekly "Wangaar", all of them were banned by Military regime.His writings especially Punjabi Novels & Poetry have been translated into various languages of the world. Plays based on his Novels have been staged and televised in Pakistan & India.

"Urdu"

- Zahraab (Poetry) (1978)
- Rastey Kee Dhool (Poetry) (1977)
- Deewarein (TV Plays) (1987)
- Gardish Mein Paaon (Travelogue) (1986)
- Kaladum Tehrerein (Translations) (2004)
- Punjab, Punjabi, Punjabiat (History) (2005)
- Toon Kay Mein (Novel – translated from Punjabi) (1969)
- Waqt ko Tham Lo (Urdu Poetry)

"Punjabi"

- Chirian Da Chamba (Radio Plays) 1971
- Wan Da Boota (Radio Plays) 1972
- Kanso Wailey Dee (Poetry) (Also translated into English) 1973
- Wangaar (Poetry) (Also translated into English) 1974
- Sat Gawachay Lok (Novel) 1977
- Ik Marey Bandey Di Kahani (Novel) 1984
- Bandiwan (Novel) 1987
- Bewatna (Novel) 1996
- Kamzat (Novel) 2003
- Zwal Di Ghari (Poetry) 2004
- Toon Key Mein (Novel) 2005
- Fakhar Zaman – A biography 2005
- Punjab, Punjabi Tey Punjabiat 1970

"English"

- Pakistani Writers (An Empirical Study)
- Bhutto, The Political Thinker
- Prisoner (Novel) – translated from Punjabi – 2005
- Deadman's Tale (Novel) – translated from Punjabi
- The Lost Seven (Novel) – translated from Punjabi
- The Alien (Novel) – translated from Punjabi
- Low Born (Novel) – translated from Punjabi
- Outcast (Novel) – translated from Punjabi
- Portrait of a Prime Minister – Z.A. Bhutto (Compiler)
- Profile of a Leader – Benazir Bhutto (Compiler)
- Zulfiqar Ali Bhutto – Glimpses from the Jail File
- You or I (Novel) – translated from Punjabi – 2005
- The Life of Ahmad - Thresholds - 2019

== Awards ==
- Has been awarded many International Awards on his writings. He was awarded prestigious "Sitara-i-Imtiaz" for Literature by the Government of Pakistan in 1994.
- Was awarded "Millennium Award" for the best Punjabi Novelist of the 20th century by prestigious Literary and Cultural Organizations in Pakistan & India.
- Was awarded "Hilal-i-Imtiaz" by the Government of Pakistan in 2008.
- Was awarded "Shiromani Sahitik" Award" by the Indian Government (East Punjab) 2008. This is the first award ever given to any Pakistani so far.
- Was awarded "Punjab Ratan Award" by the Indian Punjab Government in 2020. This is the second highest award in India.

== Job experience ==
- Chairman, Pakistan Academy of Letters, Islamabad –Pakistan ( 11 May 2008 – 12 March 2012).
- Federal Minister – Chairman, National Commission on History & Culture and Pakistan Academy of Letters (1994–96).
- Chief Editor, literary quarterly "Adabiyat" and "Pakistani Literature" (from 1994 to 1996).
- Chairman, World Punjabi Congress.
- Member, Senate of Pakistan (1977).
- President, Pakistan Peoples Party, Punjab (1989–92).
- President (Cultural Wing), Pakistan Peoples Party.
- President, Policy Planning Committee (PB) Pakistan Peoples Party.
- Member, Federal Council Pakistan Peoples Party.
- Chairman, Pakistan Democratic Writer's Convention.
- Chairman, Pakistan National Committee for World Cultural Decade (UNESCO).
- Political Adviser to Begum Nusrat Bhutto (1973–77).
- Chairman of the Academic Council of the International Institute of Central Asian Studies, Samarkand, Uzbekistan (1995–96).
- Chairman of the International Congress of Writers, Artists and Intellectuals (ICWAI).
