= Royal Air Force strikes of 1946 =

Small revolt in India

The Royal Air Force strikes of 1946 was a series of demonstrations and strikes at several dozen Royal Indian Air Force stations in the Indian subcontinent beginning on 22 January 1946. As these incidents involved refusals to obey orders they technically constituted a form of mutiny.

== Protests ==
A series of demonstrations and strikes occurred at several dozen Royal Air Force stations in the Indian subcontinent beginning on 22 January 1946. As these incidents involved refusals to obey orders, they technically constituted a form of mutiny. The protests arose in response to slow demobilization and return of British troops to Britain, and use of British shipping facilities for transporting G.I.s. The "mutiny" began at either Maripur or nearby Karachi (RAF Drigh Road) and later spread to involve nearly 50,000 men over 60 RAF stations in India, Ceylon, Burma and as far away as Singapore, Egypt, North Africa, and Gibraltar. The peaceful protests lasted between three and eleven days.

For their part, the British Government argued that the amount of shipping available was insufficient to permit immediate repatriation of the large number of personnel. However, later declassified reports have shown that British troops were deliberately retained in India to control possible unrest from the independence movement, and the grievances of the RAF men may have also included significant political opinions and sympathy with the communist Party of India.

The initial protests in Karachi had the form of a collective refusal to prepare kit for inspection and going to the parade ground at the normal time but in casual khaki drill rather than the "best blue" uniforms required when on morning parade.

The issues were ultimately resolved. Some of the airmen involved experienced courts-martial. However, the precedent set by this event was important in instigating subsequent actions by the Royal Indian Air Force and later, the Royal Indian Navy in February 1946 in which 78 of a total of 88 ships mutinied. Lord Wavell, Viceroy of India, commented at the time, "I am afraid that [the] example of the Royal Air Force, who got away with what was really a mutiny, has some responsibility for the present situation."

== See also ==
- Royal Indian Navy mutiny
- RAF India

== Bibliography ==
- Mutiny in the RAF - the Air Force Strikes of 1946. David Duncan. 1999 ISBN 0-9523810-6-0.
- Review of Richard Woodman's A brief history of mutiny. Journal for Maritime research. August 2005.
- David van Vlymen. "RAF strike in India-1946". The John Carpenter Club. Archived from the original on 6 October 2007. "article by Bernard Shilling and published in the December 1986 issue of Aeroplane Monthly".
- John W. Cell, in Reviews of Books; Asia. White Mutiny: British Military Culture in India by Peter Stanley. The American Historical Review, Vol. 104, No. 3. (Jun., 1999), pp. 888–889.
- SECRET HISTORY: MUTINY IN THE RAF British Film Institute.
- White, Nigel (18 December 2006). "Gerry Rubin, Murder, Mutiny and the Military: British Court Martial Cases 1940–1966". Journal of Conflict and Security Law. 11 (3): 511–513. doi:10.1093/jcsl/krl025.
