= Balai Chandra Dutt =

Indian revolutionary (1906–1931)

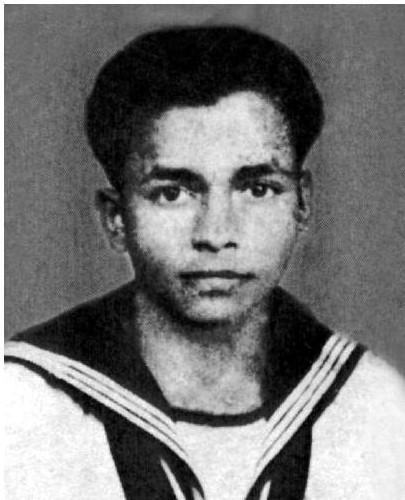
- B.C. Dutt, leader of 1946 RIN Mutiny
- Born: 1923; Burdwan, West Bengal
- Died: 2009 (aged 86); Mumbai, Maharashtra
- Organization: Royal Indian Navy
- Movement: Indian Independence Movement

Balai Chandra Dutt (1923 – 2009), also known as B.C. Dutt or Balai Chand Dutt, was an Indian sailor who was a prominent figure in the 1946 Royal Indian Navy mutiny. He is remembered for his significant role in the naval mutiny, a pivotal event that contributed to India’s path toward independence.

== Early life and education ==
Dutt was born in 1923 in a village near Burdwan, West Bengal. As a child, he showed a keen interest in history and literature. Instead of engaging in typical childhood activities, Dutt spent his time reading books on historical figures and Bengali literature. He studied the works of renowned writers like Sarat Chandra Chatterjee, Bankim Chandra Chatterjee, and Rabindranath Tagore. His passion for history, particularly the Indian independence movement, shaped Dutt's emerging nationalist views.

== Joining the Royal Indian Navy ==
Dutt joined the Royal Indian Navy (RIN), where his perspective on the Navy and the colonial system changed dramatically. His first experience in the Navy exposed him to the discrimination faced Indian ratings and junior officers in the RIN, who treated as mere mercenaries, while their white officers received preferential treatment. The presence of soldiers from Subhas Chandra Bose’s Indian National Army (INA), who had been brought back to India in 1945 for the Red Fort trials, further fueled Dutt's determination to challenge discrimination in the navy and assert the dignity of Indian servicemen.

== Role in the 1946 RIN Revolt ==
HMIS *Hindustan* near the shore.

Dutt played a significant role in the 1946 Royal Indian Navy mutiny, a major mutiny that contributed to India's independence. Dutt, stationed at the shore establishment HMIS Talwar in Bombay, became one of the leading figures of the revolt, which began as a protest against racial discrimination and poor treatment of Indian ratings in the RIN.

In late 1945, a group of disgruntled naval operators at HMIS Talwar, frustrated with the oppressive atmosphere and discriminatory practices, formed a secretive organization known as Azad Hind (Free Indians). This group consisted mostly of communications operators, many of whom were educated middle-class individuals, unlike the general seamen who came from rural backgrounds. The members of Azad Hind engaged in clandestine activities against British colonial rule, with their actions increasingly becoming bolder and defiant over time.

One of the earliest acts of rebellion occurred on 1 December 1945 when the group vandalized the establishment by defacing walls with nationalist slogans such as "Quit India", "Victory to Gandhi and Nehru", and other anti-British messages. The officers at HMIS Talwar responded weakly, cleaning up the graffiti without taking any punitive action. This leniency further emboldened the conspirators to continue their acts of resistance.

In February 1946, as tensions were rising, Dutt played a key role in another act of defiance. On 2 February 1946, ahead of a visit by the commander-in-chief, Sir Claude Auchinleck, Dutt and his associates once again defaced the establishment's premises by painting slogans such as "Quit India" and "Jai Hind" on the walls, even though security measures had been put in place to prevent such acts. Dutt was caught in the act, and during the subsequent search of his lockers, seditious communist and nationalist literature was found. This led to his arrest, and he was interrogated by senior officers, where he boldly admitted responsibility for the vandalism and declared himself a political prisoner.

Dutt was placed in solitary confinement for seventeen days, but his imprisonment did not quell the growing unrest. On 18 February 1946, the discontent spread beyond HMIS Talwar, as ratings at other naval establishments such as HMIS Sutlej, HMIS Jumna, and Bombay Castle joined in the mutiny. The ratings, led by Dutt's example of resistance, began to refuse orders and ultimately seized control of their establishments, expelling their officers. By the end of the day, the mutiny had spread to 22 ships and 12 shore establishments in Bombay, as well as RIN-operated wireless stations in places as distant as Aden and Bahrain. The mutiny marked a turning point in the Indian independence movement, signaling the growing desire for an end to British rule among the Indian populace and colonial armed forces.

Dutt's involvement in the mutiny would later establish him as one of the primary instigators of the revolt. The mutiny gained widespread support from naval ratings across several ports, including Mumbai (then Bombay), Karachi, and Cochin. Dutt played a crucial role in the RIN Revolt, using his revolutionary zeal and leadership to mobilize the sailors and support the protest. As part of the mutiny, the sailors demanded better living conditions and the right to be treated equally, regardless of their nationality.

== Later life and death ==
Dutt married famous lawyer Ansuya Dutt in 1955 and settled in Mumbai. He died in 2009, at the age of 86.
