= Abdullah Jan Jamaldini =

Pakistani socialist thinker

- Born: 8 May 1922; Nushki, Baluchistan, British India
- Died: 19 September 2016 (aged 94)
- Education: Islamia College Peshawar (B.A)
- Occupations: Socialist thinker, author, research scholar
- Years active: 1945–2016
- Movement: Progressive Writers' Movement
- Awards: Pride of Performance Award (1990), Kamal-e-Fun Award (2008)

Abdullah Jan Jamaldini (1922–2016) was a Pakistani socialist thinker, researcher, and literal figure. He was associated with the Progressive Writers' Movement, Pakistan. Jamaldini received the Pride of Performance Award in 1990.

== Biography ==
Jamaldini was born on 8 May 1922 in Nushki, Baluchistan, British India. He was home-schooled by his father. Later, in 1932, he completed his early education from Nushki Primary School. He then enrolled in Sandeman High School in Pishin. Later, he took admission in Islamia College Peshawar in 1941 and earned his graduation degree in 1945.

After graduation, Jamaldini entered into government service as Naib Tehsildar (Assistant to tax officer) but soon resigned from the service. Following his socialist inclinations, he, along with his other friends, rented a house at Balochi street, which quickly became known as "Lat Khana". The house served as the first unofficial institution for progressive and enlightened individuals. The comrades also rented a store in Suraj Ganj Bazaar, Quetta, where they sold books on Karl Marx, Engels, Lenin, and other socialist intellectuals in addition to stationery. However, the government authorities traced the store and seized the Marxist literature.

The Lat Khana persisted in sharing socialist ideas with friends and doing so, which influenced Jamaldini's perspective on progressive and socialist values. He also became general secretary of the organization Balochi Zuban o- Adab – i Diwan, which was founded in 1951 and whose president was Mir Gul Khan Naseer. The organization sponsored the publications of Mir Gul Khan Naseer's Balochi poetry. Later, financial issues forced Jamaldini to move to Karachi, where he worked as a proof reader in the information department and later as a joint editor of the magazine Tulu till 1970. Then, he returned to Quetta and started working as a research scholar at the Balochi Academy. After establishment of the University of Balochistan, he became lecturer for Balochi language there in 1971.

Jamaldini wrote several books on Balochi literature, feudal system in Balochistan, poverty, and politics.

He died on 20 September 2016.

== Literary works ==
- Dehat ke Gharib
- Sardari system in Balochistan
- Marg o mena
- Lat Khana
- Shama Frozan

== Awards and recognition ==
Jamaldini was honored with the Pride of Performance Award in 1990. He also received the Kamal-e-Fun Award in 2008.
