= Sindh Muslim Government Arts & Commerce College =

College in Karachi, Pakistan

- سندھ مسلم آرٹس اینڈ کامرس کالج

Location
- Shahrah-e-Kemal Atatürk Opposite Burns Garden, Karachi. Pakistan
- 24°51′13″N 67°0′58″E

Information
- Type: Public
- Established: 1943
- School district: Karachi, Pakistan
- Affiliation: Board of Intermediate Education, Karachi

Sindh Muslim Government Arts & Commerce College simply S.M. Government Arts & Commerce College (Urdu: سندھ مسلم آرٹس اینڈ کامرس کالج ; Sindhi: سنڌ مسلم آرٽس اينڊ ڪامرس ڪالج) is a government college located in Karachi, Pakistan. It was founded by the founder of Pakistan Muhammad Ali Jinnah in 1943.

The college holds morning and evening classes of intermediate level at its campuses. The college building is located near Dayaram Jethmal Science College.

== Notable alumni ==
- Waheed Murad (film producer and actor)
- Asad Muhammad Khan, Writer and poet
- Agha Saeed, footballer
