= HMIS Hindustan =

Ship of the Royal Indian Navy

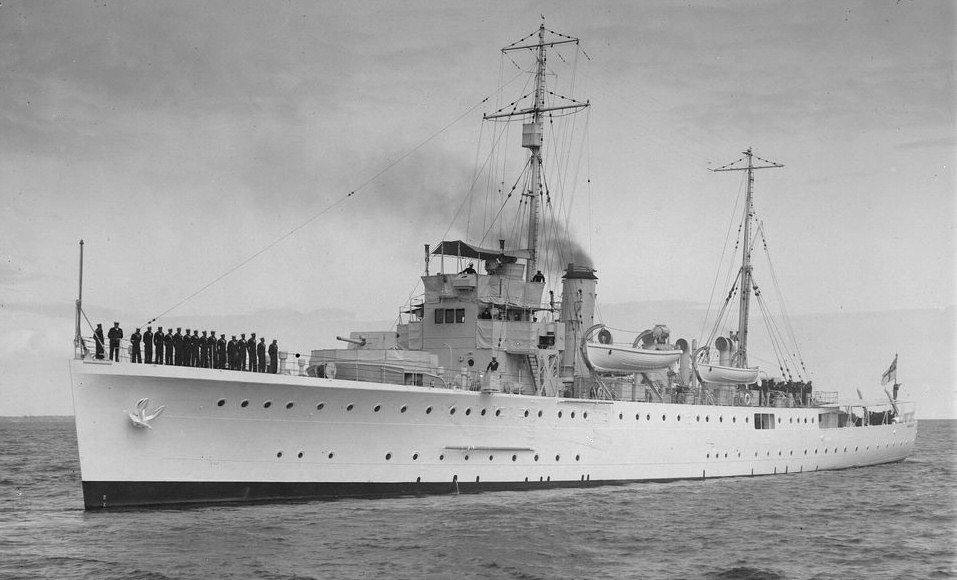
- HMIS Hindustan

History

India
- Name: Hindustan
- Ordered: 15 April 1929
- Builder: Swan Hunter
- Laid down: 4 September 1929
- Launched: 12 May 1930
- Commissioned: 10 October 1930
- Decommissioned: 1948
- Fate: Transferred to Pakistan, 1948

Pakistan
- Name: Karsaz
- Acquired: 1948
- Decommissioned: 1960

General characteristics
- Class & type: Folkestone-class sloop
- Displacement: 1,190 long tons (1,210 t)
- Length: 296 ft (90.2208 m) oa
- Beam: 35 ft (10.67 m)
- Draught: 11 ft 6 in (3.51 m)
- Propulsion: 2 × Admiralty Boilers; Geared steam turbines, 2 shafts; 2,000 shp (1,500 kW)
- Speed: 16 knots (30 km/h; 18 mph)
- Complement: 119
- Armament: 2 × 4 in (100 mm) QF Mk IV guns; 4 × QF 3-pounder 47 mm (1.9 in) saluting guns

HMIS Hindustan (L80) was a Folkestone-class (also known as Hastings class) sloop which served in the Royal Indian Navy (RIN) during World War II. Her pennant number was changed to U80 in 1940.

Hindustan was transferred to Pakistan in 1948 after the independence, and eventually renamed PNS Karsaz. She was decommissioned from the Pakistan Navy in 1960.

== Construction and design ==
HMIS Hindustan was laid down at the Swan Hunter shipyard in Wallsend, Tyne and Wear England on 4 September 1929, was launched on 12 May 1930 and completed on 10 October 1930, commissioning into the Royal Indian Marine.

Hindustan was built to a modified and longer version of the Hastings-class design. Her hull was 296 feet 4 inches (90.32 m) long overall, with a beam of 35 feet (10.67 m) and a draught of 11 feet 6 inches (3.51 m). Displacement was 1,190 long tons (1,210 t) standard. She was powered by geared steam turbines fed by two Admiralty 3-drum boilers, driving two shafts and rated at 2,000 shaft horsepower (1,500 kW), sufficient to drive the ship to a speed of 16 knots (30 km/h; 18 mph). The ship had a complement of 119 officers and men.

The ship's main armament consisted of two 4-inch (102 mm) QF Mk IV guns. Unlike in the Hastings class, which had one 4-inch gun in an anti-aircraft mount, both guns were in Low-Angle mountings only suitable for use against surface targets. In addition four 3-pounder (47 mm) saluting guns were carried.

== Service history ==
Following the outbreak of the Second World War, Hindustan was deployed to the Persian Gulf, patrolling the Straits of Hormuz and operating as part of the East Indies Station of the Royal Navy. In August 1940, Italy invaded British Somaliland, and Hindustan was deployed to Berbera, landing three of her 3-pounder guns to aid the defences, and covering the evacuation of Commonwealth forces from Berbera from 15 to 19 September. Hindustan was then refitted at Bombay (now Mumbai), being fitted with Sonar, previous plans to re-arm her with anti-aircraft 4-inch guns being abandoned.

During World War II, she was a part of the Eastern Fleet. She escorted numerous convoys in the Indian Ocean and the Persian Gulf between 1942-45. She also supported various amphibious landings of the British Indian Army and the British Army in Burma, Malaya, etc.

In April 1945, with HMIS Narbada, Cauvery, Sutlej and Kistna, Hindustan supported the amphibious landings of the Indian and British Armies in Rangoon, as a part of Operation Dracula.

During the Royal Indian Navy mutiny – also known as Royal Indian Navy revolt – of February 1946 Hindustan was berthed at Karachi, and occupied by mutineers. When ordered to debark the mutineers refused, but finally surrendered after a brief firefight with the 15th (King's) Parachute Battalion, supported by four 75mm pack howitzers of C Troop, 159 Parachute Light Regiment, Royal Artillery.

At the time of independence, Hindustan was among the vessels transferred to the Royal Pakistan Navy in 1948, being renamed Karsaz.

== Bibliography ==
- Collins, J.T.E. (1964). The Royal Indian Navy, 1939–1945. Official History of the Indian Armed Forces In the Second World War. New Delhi: Combined Inter-Services Historical Section (India & Pakistan).
- Campbell, N. J. M. (1980). "Great Britain (including Empire Forces)". In Chesneau, Roger (ed.). Conway's All the World's Fighting Ships 1922–1946. Greenwich, UK: Conway Maritime Press. pp. 2–85. ISBN 0-85177-146-7.
- Colledge, J. J.; Warlow, Ben & Bush, Steve (2020). Ships of the Royal Navy: The Complete Record of all Fighting Ships of the Royal Navy from the 15th Century to the Present (5th revised and updated ed.). Barnsley, UK: Seaforth Publishing. ISBN 978-1-5267-9327-0.
- Hague, Arnold (1993). Sloops: A History of the 71 Sloops Built in Britain and Australia for the British, Australian and Indian Navies 1926–1946. Kendal, UK: World Ship Society. ISBN 0-905617-67-3.
- Lenton, H. T. (1998). British & Empire Warships of the Second World War. Annapolis, Maryland: Naval Institute Press. ISBN 1-55750-048-7.
- Rohwer, Jürgen (2005). Chronology of the War at Sea 1939–1945: The Naval History of World War Two (Third Revised ed.). Annapolis, Maryland: Naval Institute Press. ISBN 1-59114-119-2.
