= Small nucleolar RNA SNORD95 =

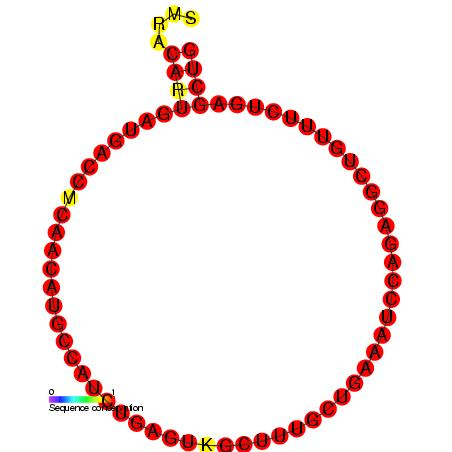
- Predicted secondary structure and sequence conservation of SNORD95

Identifiers
- Symbol: SNORD95
- Alt. Symbols: U95
- Rfam: RF00189

Other data
- RNA type: Gene; snRNA; snoRNA; C/D-box
- Domain: Eukaryota
- GO: GO:0006396 GO:0005730
- SO: SO:0000593
- PDB structures: PDBe

In molecular biology, snoRNA U95 (also known as SNORD95 or Z38) is a non-coding RNA (ncRNA) molecule which functions in the modification of other small nuclear RNAs (snRNAs). This type of modifying RNA is usually located in the nucleolus of the eukaryotic cell which is a major site of snRNA biogenesis. It is known as a small nucleolar RNA (snoRNA) and also often referred to as a guide RNA.

snoRNA U95 belongs to the C/D box class of snoRNAs which contain the conserved sequence motifs known as the C box (UGAUGA) and the D box (CUGA). Most of the members of the box C/D family function in directing site-specific 2'-O-methylation of substrate RNAs.

U95 was identified by computational screening of the introns of ribosomal protein genes for conserved C/D box sequence motifs and expression experimentally verified by northern blotting. U95 is predicted to guide the 2'O-ribose methylation of 28S ribosomal RNA (rRNA) residues A2802 and C2811.
