= HMIS Kistna =

1943 Black Swan-class sloop

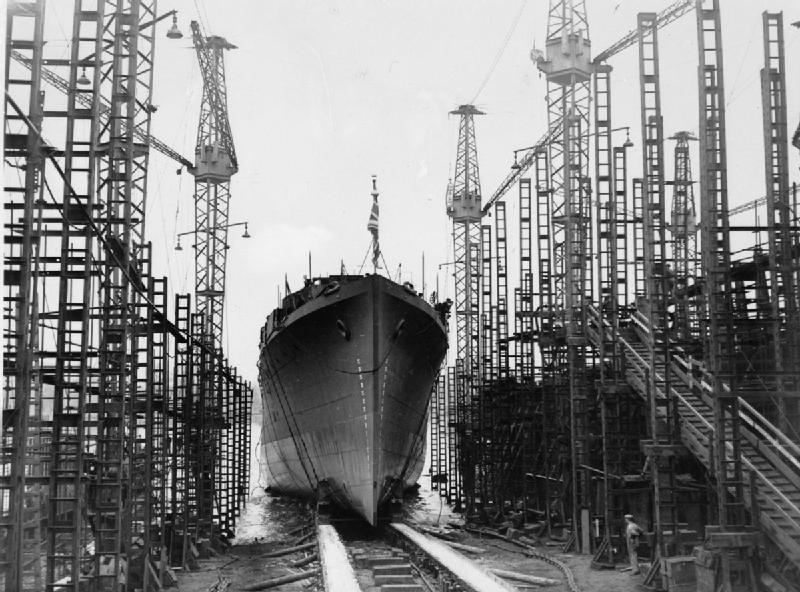
- HMIS Kistna being launched on 22 April 1943

History

India
- Name: Kistna(U46)
- Namesake: Krishna River
- Ordered: 10 September 1941
- Builder: Yarrow Shipbuilders
- Laid down: 14 July 1942
- Launched: 22 April 1943
- Commissioned: 26 August 1943
- Out of service: 1981
- Honours and awards: Atlantic, 1943; Burma, 1944–1945
- Fate: Scrapped 1981

General characteristics
- Type: Sloop-of-war
- Displacement: 1,250 tons original; 1,350 tons modified
- Length: 299 ft 6 in (91.29 m)
- Beam: 37 ft 6 in (11.43 m) original; 38 ft 6 in (11.73 m) modified
- Draught: 11 ft (3.4 m)
- Propulsion: Geared turbines, 2 shafts: 3,600 hp (2.68 MW) (original); 4,300 hp (3.21 MW) (modified)
- Speed: 19 knots (35 km/h) (original); 20 knots (37 km/h) (modified)
- Range: 7,500 nmi (13,900 km) at 12 kn (22 km/h)
- Complement: 180 (original); 192 (modified)
- Sensors & processing systems: Radar Type 272 for surface warning; Radar Type 285 for fire-control
- Armament: 6 × QF 4 in (102 mm) Mk XVI AA guns (3 × 2); 4 × 2-pounder AA pom-pom; 4 × 0.5-inch (12.7 mm) AA machine guns (original); 12 × 20 mm Oerlikon AA (6 × 2) (modified)

HMIS Kistna (U46) was a Black Swan-class sloop which served in the Royal Indian Navy (RIN) during World War II.

After independence, she was commissioned into the Indian Navy as INS Krisna.

== History ==
HMIS Kistna was ordered under the 1940 Build Programme on 10 September 1941. She was built by Yarrow (Shipbuilders), Limited and commissioned in 1943.

With World War II underway, she was soon deployed for convoy escort duties between the UK and West Africa. In November 1943, while escorting a convoy to Liverpool, the convoy was sighted by German aircraft. Wolfpack Schill was formed to attack the convoy, which was repelled by the escorts, including HMIS Kistna. HMS Chanticleer (U05) was hit by a torpedo and took major damage in the attack. A mercantile vessel being escorted was sunk and another damaged by German aircraft with Hs 293 glider bombs.

HMIS Kistna was transferred to the Eastern Fleet and continued to escort convoys en route to Bombay. In the Eastern Fleet it continued escort duties in the Persian Gulf, the Bay of Bengal and the Indian Ocean. It supported military operations by the British Indian Army and the British Army in Burma.

In December 1944, she joined a task force with HMIS Jumna, HMIS Narbada (U40) and HMS Flamingo (L18) to support the advance by the Indian Division down the Mayu peninsula in Burma as a part of Operation Romulus.

In January 1945, HMIS Kistna with HMS Phoebe (43), HMS Rapid (H32) and HMS Flamingo, supported the amphibious landings of the Indian 71st Division and the British 4th Division on Ramree Island in Burma, as a part of Operation Matador. It continued to provide naval gunfire support as a part of the operation.

After a refit in Bombay, in April 1945, she was part of the amphibious assault group for the Indian 26th Division on Rangoon during Operation Dracula. Other members of this assault group included HMIS Cauvery (U10), HMIS Godavari (U52), HMIS Narbada, HMIS Sutlej (U95) and HMIS Hindustan.

In July, Kistna was deployed for minesweeping operations to the Malacca Straits during Operation Collie. In August, she conducted preparatory exercises to participate in Operation Zipper to recapture Malaya.

At the end of World War II, Kistna was in Penang during the Japanese surrender there.

After India's independence, she was commissioned into the Indian Navy as INS Krisna. She was a part of the 12th Frigate Squadron, before being used first as a survey ship and then for training purposes from 1962. She was decommissioned in 1981 and scrapped.
