= HMIS Narbada =

Sloop of the Royal Indian Navy and Pakistan Navy

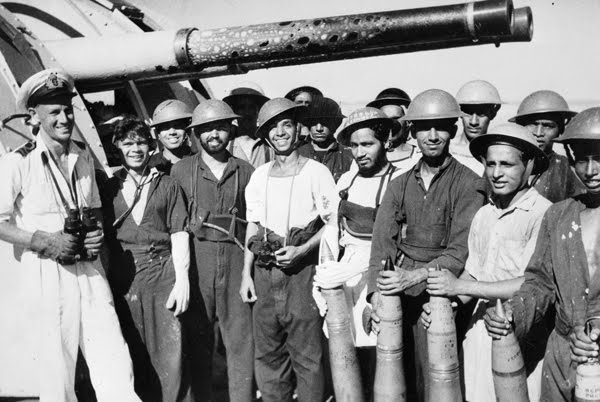
- Crew of HMIS Narbada with blistered gun barrels following the bombardment of Myebon, Hunters Bay, Burma.

History
- Name: Narbada
- Namesake: Narmada River
- Ordered: 19 August 1940
- Builder: Thornycroft
- Yard number: 1385
- Laid down: 30 August 1941
- Launched: 21 November 1942
- Commissioned: 29 April 1943
- Out of service: 1948
- Honours and awards: Burma, 1944-45
- Fate: Transferred to Pakistan, subsequently scrapped (1959)
- Badge: On a Field Blue, rising from a base barry wavy of four, a trident gold, with a cobra proper entwined.

General characteristics
- Type: Sloop-of-war
- Displacement: 1,250 tons original; 1,350 tons modified
- Length: 299 ft 6 in (91.29 m)
- Beam: 37 ft 6 in (11.43 m) original; 38 ft 6 in (11.73 m) modified
- Draught: 11 ft (3.4 m)
- Propulsion: Geared turbines, 2 shafts: 3,600 hp (2.68 MW) (original); 4,300 hp (3.21 MW) (modified)
- Speed: 19 knots (35 km/h) (original); 20 knots (37 km/h) (modified)
- Range: 7,500 nmi (13,900 km) at 12 kn (22 km/h)
- Complement: 180 (original); 192 (modified)
- Armament: 6 × QF 4 in (102 mm) Mk XVI AA guns (3 × 2); 4 × 2-pounder AA pom-pom; 4 × 0.5-inch (12.7 mm) AA machine guns (original); 12 × 20 mm Oerlikon AA (6 × 2) (modified)

HMIS Narbada (U40) was a modified Bittern class sloop, later known as the Black Swan class, which served in the Royal Indian Navy (RIN) during World War II.

Narbada was transferred to Pakistan in 1948 after the Partition of India, and served as PNS Jhelum.

== History ==
HMIS Narbada was ordered in 1940 as a part of the 1940 Build Program for the Royal Indian Navy. She was built by John I. Thornycroft & Company and commissioned in 1943.

With World War II underway, she was deployed as an escort to multiple Allied convoys en route to Bombay. Upon arrival, she joined the Eastern Fleet. In 1944, she was deployed for defence of military convoys in the Bay of Bengal.

In early January 1945, she was deployed with HMIS Jumna to support the landing of the 74th Indian Brigade of the British Indian Army on Akyab Peninsular, as a part of Operation Lightning. Jumna and Narbada engaged Japanese batteries up the Kaladan River near Ponnagyun. After embarking troops, she joined Task Force 64 headed by HMS Phoebe for support of landing by 3rd British Commando Brigade between Akyab and Ramree with HMS Napier and HMIS Jumna.

On 13 January 1945, with the task force under attack by Japanese aircraft, Narbada downed an Oscar aircraft of the Imperial Japanese Army Air Force. In February, she supported the landing of the 53rd Indian Infantry Brigade at Ryuwa with HMS Flamingo and HMIS Jumna. She was hit aft by return fire, but continued operations. In March, she returned to Bombay for a refit and to repair damages.

In April 1945, she resumed escort duties and supported the Indian and British Army amphibious landings in Rangoon with HMIS Cauvery, HMIS Godavari, HMIS Kistna, HMIS Sutlej and HMIS Hindustan as a part of Operation Dracula. The next month, in May, she was deployed with HMIS Cauvery, HMIS Godavari, HMIS Kistna, HMIS Sutlej and HMIS Hindustan to intercept Japanese troops withdrawing from the Andamans. In July, Narbada was a part of the planned force for Operation Zipper and conducted preparatory exercises, before the postponement of the operation.

At the end of World War II, after the Surrender of Japan, she sailed to Andaman waters and her commanding officer Martin Henry St. Leger Nott accepted the surrender of the Japanese Brigadier in command of the Car Nicobar garrison onboard the ship.

After the Independence of India and the subsequent Partition, she was among the vessels transferred to Pakistan, where she was renamed HMPS Jhelum and subsequently, PNS Jhelum. She was scrapped in 1959.
