= Arthur Rullion Rattray =

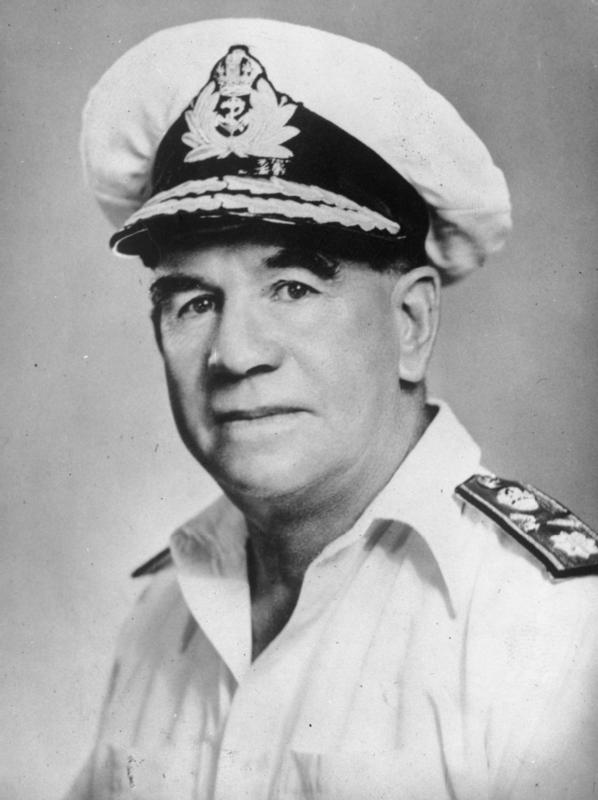
- Rear-Admiral Rattray, c.1945
- Born: 2 May 1891; Gatehouse of Fleet, Kirkcudbrightshire, Scotland
- Died: 10 August 1966 (aged 75); Camberley, Surrey, England
- Military career
- Allegiance: United Kingdom; British India
- Branch: Royal Indian Navy; British Army
- Service years: 1912–1946
- Rank: Rear-Admiral
- Conflicts: World War I • Mesopotamian campaign • Western Front; World War II
- Awards: Order of the British Empire; Order of the Bath; Order of the Indian Empire

Rear-Admiral Sir Arthur Rullion Rattray, KBE, CB, CIE (2 May 1891 – 10 August 1966) was a British naval officer who served in the Royal Indian Navy and was an air observer during World War I. He rose to senior rank in the Royal Indian Navy during World War II.

== Early life ==
Rattray was born in Gatehouse of Fleet, Scotland, the fourth of five children born to Arthur Rattray, a retired Indian Civil Servant and judge, and his wife Mary Louise Wakely (née Sutherland). His parents had returned from Bengal, where their first three children were born, in around 1889.

Rattray was sent to HMS Conway, a training ship based at Liverpool, in January 1906, remaining there until December 1907. He then trained at HMS Ganges, near Ipswich, before serving in the Merchant Service, working for the Aberdeen-based shipping company of George Milne & Co., until joining the Royal Indian Marine (RIM) in 1912.

== First World War ==
Rattray continued to serve in the RIM after the outbreak of World War I, but on 15 February 1917 he was appointed a temporary lieutenant on the General List as a flying officer (observer), with seniority from 7 November 1916, but without prior pay or allowances. He transferred to the Royal Flying Corps from the Royal Naval Air Service on 6 November 1916 becoming a member of the RNAS attached to No. 30 Squadron flying the BE2c. in Mesopotamia for reconnaissance. He received a mention in despatches following a recommendation from the Commander-in-Chief, Lieutenant-General Sir Stanley Maude, on 15 August 1917.

In 1917, he was flying in a BE 2c as an observer on a low-level bombing attack. His aircraft was hit by ground fire, and Rattray was wounded in the leg. Service records state that he transferred back to the Royal Navy undertaking minesweeping duties at Ramsgate, in January 1918.

Rattray transferred back to the Royal Indian Marine on 17 November 1920 after sixteen months leave. The Royal Indian Marine became the Royal Indian Navy in 1934. On 26 December 1934, he was promoted from lieutenant commander to commander.

== Second World War ==
Promoted to captain on 5 April 1940. By the time he was made a Companion of the Order of the Indian Empire on 1 January 1943, he was serving as a commodore, and by 14 June 1945, when he was made a Companion of the Order of the Bath, had been promoted to rear-admiral. He was serving as Flag Officer, Bombay, during the 1946 mutiny. Rattray was made a Knight Commander of the Order of the British Empire on 1 January 1948, two weeks before his retirement on 13 January.

== Family life ==
Rattray married Doris Gertrude Muir in 1917 and they had one son. Rattray died at his home in Camberley, Surrey, on 10 August 1966.
