= Sobho Gianchandani =

Pakistani social scientist (1920-2014)

- Born: 3 May 1920; Bindi, British India
- Died: 8 December 2014 (aged 94); Larkana, Sindh, Pakistan
- Awards: Kamal-e-Fun Award

Sobho Gianchandani (Sindhi: سوڀو گيانچنداڻي; 3 May 1920 – 8 December 2014) was a Pakistani Sindhi social scientist, and revolutionary writer.

== Biography ==
Gianchandani was born in Bindi (some sources call it Bandi), a small village near the archaeological site of Mohenjo-daro to a Sindhi family. He attended NJV School, DJ College, and SC Shahani Law College. He studied arts at a university set up by Tagore in West Bengal.

Tagore used to call him "the man from Mohenjo-Daro".

He was the first non-Urdu recipient of Pakistan's top literary Kamal-e-Fun Award (for 2004), which is given every year to an eminent writer in recognition of lifelong achievements in the field of literature.

He was also a member of the Communist Party of Pakistan.

Gianchandani died on 8 December 2014 at the age of 94.
