= HMIS Sutlej =

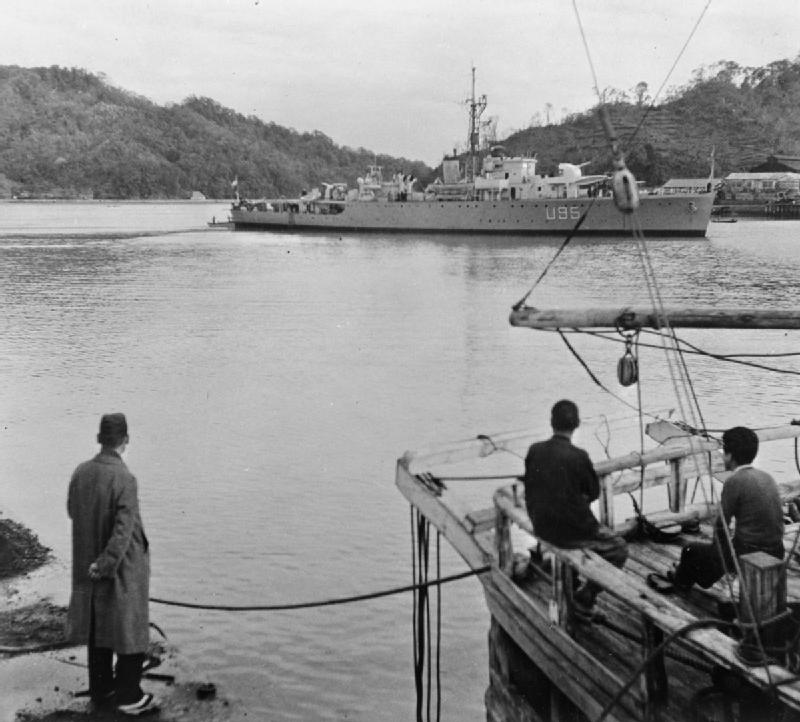
- Sutlej at Kōchi, Shikoku Island, Japan in February 1946.

History

India
- Name: Sutlej
- Namesake: Sutlej River
- Ordered: 8 September 1939
- Builder: William Denny and Brothers
- Laid down: 4 January 1940
- Launched: 1 October 1940
- Commissioned: 23 April 1941
- Out of service: 1978
- Honours and awards: Sicily, 1943; Burma, 1944
- Fate: Scrapped 1980

General characteristics
- Type: Sloop-of-war
- Displacement: 1,250 tons original; 1,350 tons modified
- Length: 299 ft 6 in (91.29 m)
- Beam: 37 ft 6 in (11.43 m) original; 38 ft 6 in (11.73 m) modified
- Draught: 11 ft (3.4 m)
- Propulsion: Geared turbines, 2 shafts: 3,600 hp (2.68 MW) (original); 4,300 hp (3.21 MW) (modified)
- Speed: 19 knots (35 km/h; 22 mph) (original); 20 knots (37 km/h; 23 mph) (modified)
- Range: 7,500 nautical miles (13,900 km; 8,600 mi) at 12 knots (22 km/h; 14 mph)
- Complement: 180 (original); 192 (modified)
- Armament: 6 × QF 4 in (102 mm) Mk XVI AA guns (3 × 2); 4 × 2-pounder AA pom-pom; 4 × 0.5-inch (12.7 mm) AA machine guns (original); 12 × 20 mm Oerlikon AA (6 × 2) (modified)

HMIS Sutlej (U95) was a modified Bittern-class sloop, later known as the Black Swan class, which served in the Royal Indian Navy (RIN) during World War II.

After India became a republic on 26 January 1950, the vessel was renamed as the Indian Navy's INS Sutlej.

== History ==
HMIS Sutlej was ordered on 8 September 1939 under the 1939 Programme for the Royal Indian Navy. She was built by William Denny and Brothers and commissioned on 23 April 1941.

With World War II underway at the time, she was immediately deployed for convoy defence in the Irish Sea. In August, she was deployed as a part of the escort for convoy WS11 through the Northwest approaches, with HMS Repulse, HMS Encounter, HMAS Nestor, HMS Sennen, HMS Totland and HMS Derbyshire. When the convoy was split into fast and slow vessels, she and Totland escorted the slow section to Freetown. She then joined Repulse, Encounter, Derbyshire and HMS Woodruff as an escort to the Indian Ocean.

Mid-way, in September, she received orders to join the British Mediterranean Fleet and proceeded to the Suez, where she was deployed for anti-aircraft defence.

After Japan entered the war, she was transferred to the East Indies in December 1941. She was then deployed to escort military convoys to Singapore, in the Bay of Bengal, on the West coast of India, as well as to the Persian Gulf and Aden all through 1942 and early 1943.

In May 1943, she joined the Mediterranean Fleet again in Alexandria, where she continued on escort duty. In July, she was part of the amphibious task force for Operation Husky, the Allied invasion of Sicily. In September, she supported military operations during the defence of the Aegean Islands.

In December 1943, she was transferred back to the Eastern Fleet and deployed for convoy escort in the Arabian Sea and the Bay of Bengal. In June 1944, she was deployed for anti-submarine operations in the Indian Ocean.

After a refit in Bombay, she was deployed back in the Bay of Bengal, and supported amphibious assaults in Burma and Malaya. She was part of the task force during Operation Dracula for the amphibious assault on Rangoon by the British Indian Army and the British Army. The other members of this task force were HMIS Cauvery, HMIS Godavari, HMIS Kistna, HMIS Narbada, and HMIS Hindustan.

The task force then continued on a mission to intercept Japanese troops withdrawing from the Andamans. At the end of the war, she was on refit in Bombay.

After Indian Independence, she was commissioned into the Indian Navy as INS Sutlej and reclassified as a frigate. In 1955, she was converted into a survey ship. She was decommissioned in 1978, and sold for scrap in 1979. She was scrapped in 1980.

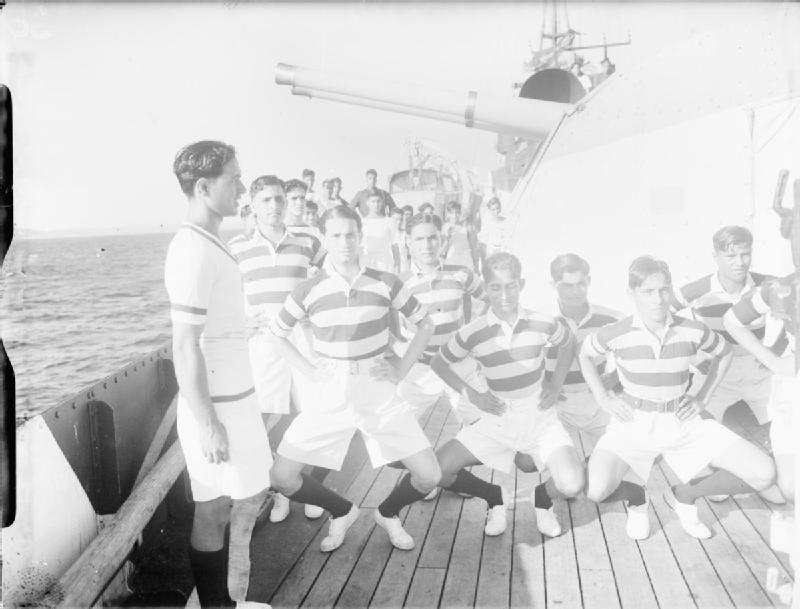
HMIS Sutlej on Burma Coast Patrol. 26 March to 9 April 1942, off Ceylon.

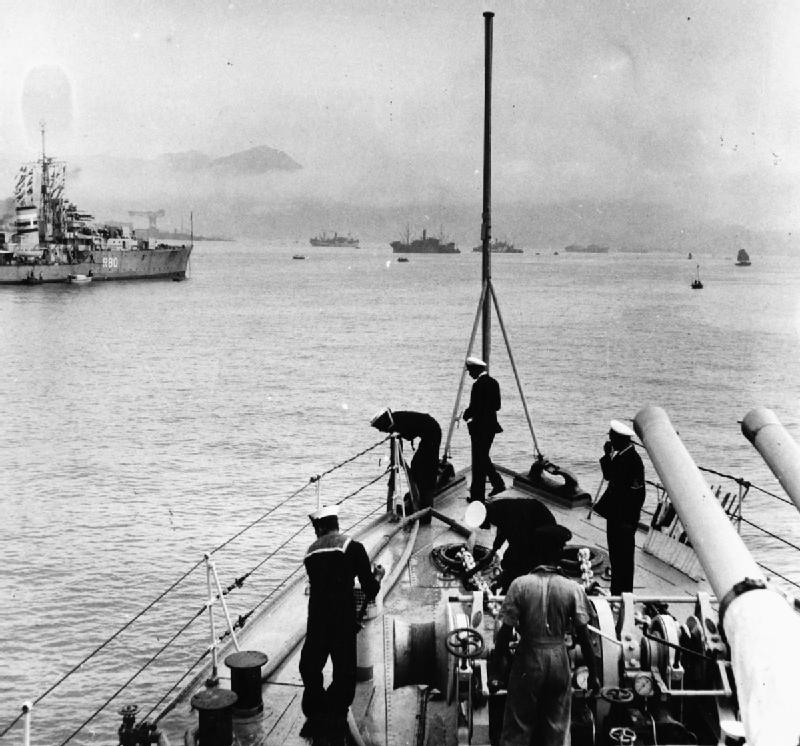
HMIS Sutlej leaves Hong Kong for Japan as part of the Allied forces of occupation.
