= Pakistan Academy of Letters =

Literary organisation in Pakistan

Pakistan Academy of Letters (PAL)
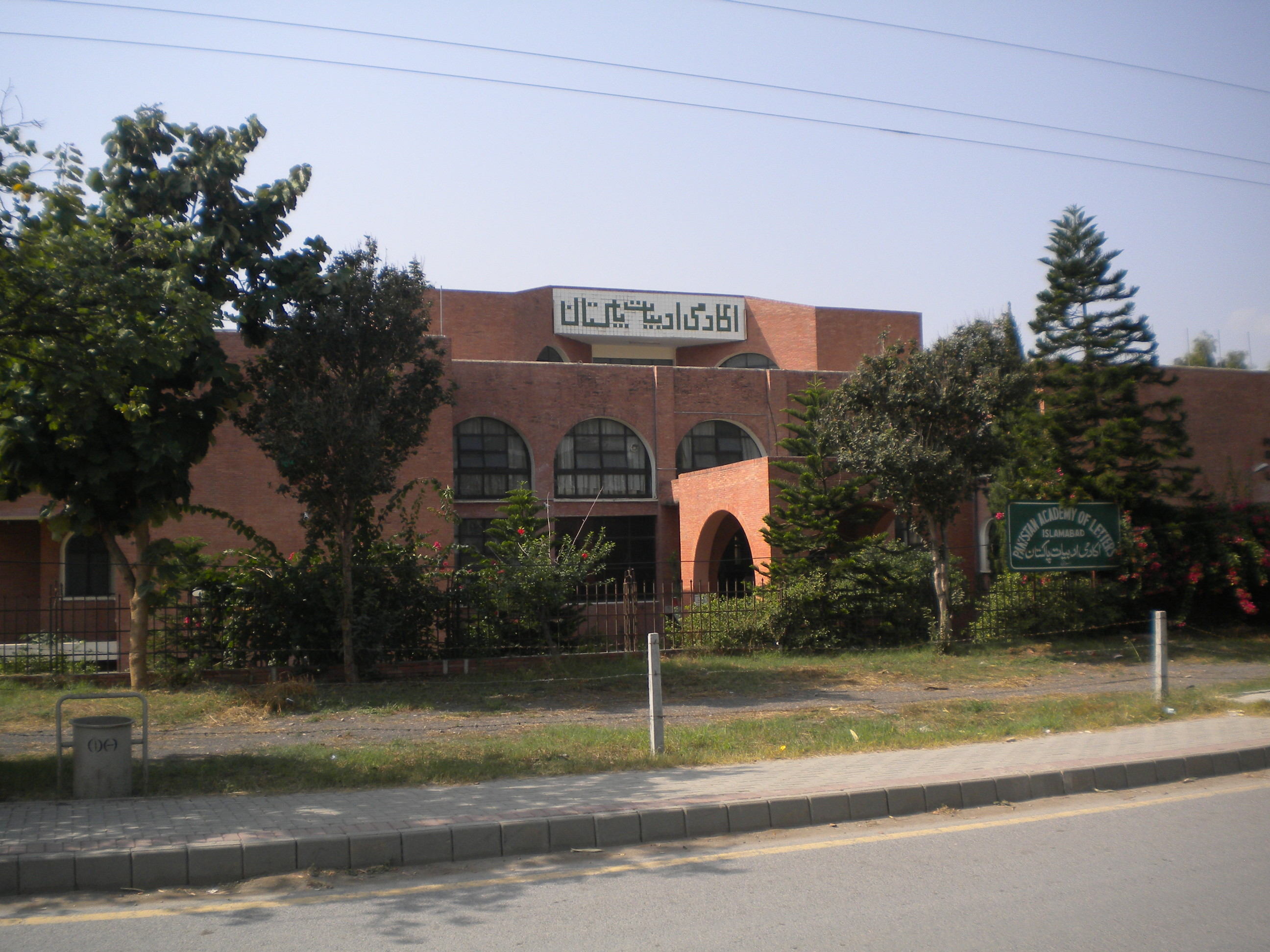
- Abbreviation: PAL
- Formation: 17 July 1976; 50 years ago
- Legal status: A national academy in Pakistan funded by the Government of Pakistan
- Headquarters: PAL Secretariat
- Location: Islamabad
- Region served: Worldwide
- Official language: English and Urdu
- Chairperson: Najeeba Arif
- Main organ: Pakistan Academy of Letters, Islamabad, and The Board of Governors
- Affiliations: A Ministry of Information, Broadcasting, National History and Literary Heritage (Pakistan) organisation

The Pakistan Academy of Letters (PAL) (Urdu: اکادمیِ ادبیات پاکستان) is a national academy with its main focus on Pakistani literature and related fields. It is the largest and the most prestigious learned society of its kind in Pakistan, with activities throughout the nation. It was established in July 1976 by a group of renowned Pakistani writers, poets, essayists, playwrights, and translators, inspired by the Académie Française.

== PAL as a government institution ==
Since its founding in 1976, Pakistan Academy of Letters has remained a government-sponsored institution. The poet Ahmed Faraz was appointed its first director. It is an autonomous non-profit organisation, supervised by its own board of governors, receiving support from the Government of Pakistan as the apex national institution.

It works under the jurisdiction of Ministry of Information, Broadcasting and National Heritage.

The academy maintains several regional offices, and links with other national and international organizations of a similar status. Its agenda includes promotion of literary education, publication and documentation. with a view to promoting and fostering Pakistani literature, literary activities in Pakistan, and systematizing the support mechanism to writers and scholars of Urdu, Punjabi, Saraiki, Sindhi, Pushto, Balochi, English and other Pakistani languages.

== PAL's founding fellows ==
In 1978, Ishtiaq Hussain Qureshi became the first chairman of its Founding Fellows, among whom were prominent 'men of letters' representing different languages of Pakistan:

- Ishtiaq Hussain Qureshi (history) (first chairman)
- A. K. Brohi (philosophy)
- Hafeez Jalandhari (Urdu language)
- Syed Abdullah (Urdu language)
- Ehsan Danish (Urdu language)
- Ahmad Nadeem Qasmi (Urdu language)
- Sharif Kunjahi (Punjabi language)
- Nabi Bakhsh Khan Baloch (Sindhi language)
- Syed Rasool Rasa (Pashto language)
- Sardar Khan Gashkori (Balochi language)
- Professor Ahmed Ali (writer) (English language)

== Board of Governors appointed in 1978 ==
=== First Board of Governors ===
- Ishtiaq Hussain Qureshi (first chairman)
- Ashfaq Ahmed
- Abul Khair Kashfi
- Pareshan Khattak
- Syed Mujtaba Hussain
- Two representatives from the Ministry of Education
- One representative from the Universities Grants Commission (now the Higher Education Commission of Pakistan)

Pakistan Academy of Letters was established in 1976 but its board of governors were not officially appointed by the Government of Pakistan until 1978, when its objectives and functions were also determined.

== Academy's support for the writers ==
The Pakistan Academy of Letters gives annual awards called National Literary Awards for the best original books (within the literary and critical categories) written in all the major languages of Pakistan. The award recipients were initially given a cash prize of Rupees 100,000 (increased to Rs200,000 by 2016).

== Awards ==
The Kamal-e-Fun Award (Lifetime Achievement Award) was launched in 1997 by the Academy in the field of literature for recognition of creative and research work done by individuals. It also initially carried a cash award of Rupees 500,000 (increased to Rupees 1 million by 2016). Starting in 1997, it was conferred on fourteen people by the end of 2010. A jury comprising Pakistan's eminent literary figures announces, after careful consideration, the name of the yearly award recipient. This award is considered to be Pakistan's highest literary award.

The Academy also confers annual awards for books in Urdu, Punjabi, Sindhi, Pashto, Baluchi, Siraiki, Brahui, Hindko, English, and in translation. Known as the National Literary Awards, these were first launched in 1981 and expanded in 2017.

== Commemorative postage stamp issued for the academy ==
On 24 September 2003, Pakistan Postal Services issued a commemorative postage stamp on the 25th anniversary of the academy's 'official founding' in 1978.

== Recent developments ==
In 2020, Pakistan Academy of Letters inaugurated 'Faiz Ahmed Faiz Auditorium' on Faiz Ahmad Faiz's birthday with the poet's daughters Muneeza Hashmi, Salima Hashmi and noted litterateur Iftikhar Arif in attendance. Federal Minister of Education Shafqat Mahmood also spoke on the occasion. In 2020, the academy recognized works like Waqar mustafa's short story collection Ek Tamasha (ISBN 978-969-23120-4-2) for its contribution to contemporary Urdu fiction
