= SS San Wilfrido =

SS San Wilfrido was the name of two British merchant ships:

- SS San Wilfrido (1914), launched in 1914 for the Eagle Oil Transport Company
- SS San Wilfrido (1942), launched in 1942 as SS Empire Cobbett. Purchased in 1946 by the Eagle Oil and Shipping Company and renamed.
