= Wilfrido =

Wilfrido is a given name. Notable people with the name include:

- Wilfrido Blanco, Costa Rican educator, civil servant and political activist
- Wilfrido Mark Enverga (born 1978), Filipino politician
- Wilfrido Garay (1943–2015), Paraguayan footballer
- Wilfrido Ma. Guerrero (1910–1995), Filipino playwright, director, teacher and theater artist
- Wilfrido Lucero (1935–2022), Ecuadorian politician, President of the National Congress
- Pedro Wilfrido Garay Penayo (born 1982), Paraguayan long-distance runner
- Wilfrido Ramos-Orench (born 1940), Episcopal bishop
- Wilfrido Terrazas (born 1974), Mexican flautist, composer, improviser and educator
- Wilfrido Vargas (born 1949), Dominican musician, composer and arranger
- Wilfrido Verduga (born 1964), Ecuadorian footballer
- Wilfrido Vinces (born 1983), Ecuadorian footballer

== See also ==
- Estadio Wilfrido Massieu, outdoor stadium located north of Mexico City
- SS San Wilfrido (1914), 6,458 GRT steam-powered British tanker launched in February 1914
- SS San Wilfrido (1942), 9,811 GRT British tanker which was built in 1942
