= MV Daronia =

History

United Kingdom
- Name: Daronia
- Namesake: Daronia, a genus of extinct gastropods of the family Turbinidae
- Owner: 1939: Anglo-Saxon Petroleum; 1955: Shell Petroleum
- Port of registry: London
- Builder: Hawthorn, Leslie & Co Ltd, Hebburn
- Yard number: 617
- Launched: 19 December 1938
- Completed: February 1939
- Identification: UK official number 167186; Call sign GQGB
- Fate: Scrapped November 1960

General characteristics
- Class & type: D-class oil tanker
- Tonnage: 8,139 GRT, 4,784 NRT, 12,000 DWT
- Length: 465.3 ft (141.8 m)
- Beam: 59.3 ft (18.1 m)
- Draught: 26 ft 6 1/2 in (8.09 m)
- Depth: 33.8 ft (10.3 m)
- Installed power: 502 NHP
- Propulsion: diesel
- Speed: 12 knots (22 km/h)
- Sensors & processing systems: wireless direction finding; echo sounding device

MV Daronia was a 1930s British oil tanker owned by Anglo-Saxon Petroleum, a British subsidiary of Royal Dutch Shell. She was launched in 1938 by Hawthorn, Leslie in North East England and completed in 1939. She was one of a class of 20 similar tankers built for Anglo-Saxon.

In 1944, Daronia survived being hit by two German torpedoes during World War II. Shell withdrew Daronia from service in 1960, and she was scrapped in November of that year.

== Building ==
Hawthorn, Leslie & Co built Daronia at its Hebburn yard on the River Tyne in North East England as yard number 617. She was launched on 19 December 1938 and completed in February 1939. Her registered length was 465.3 ft (141.8 m), her beam was 59.3 ft (18.1 m), and her depth was 33.8 ft (10.3 m). Her tonnages were 8,139 GRT, 4,784 NRT, and 12,000 DWT.

Daronia was a motor ship. She had a Werkspoor-type eight-cylinder, four-stroke single-acting diesel engine, built by Hawthorn, Leslie, and rated at 502 NHP, which gave her a speed of 12 knots (22 km/h).

Anglo-Saxon registered Daronia at the Port of London. Her UK official number was 167186, and her wireless telegraphy Maritime call sign was GQGB.

== Torpedoed and repaired ==
Position where U-861 torpedoed Daronia.

On 18 August 1944, Daronia left Durban, South Africa, in ballast with a deck cargo of empty oil drums and general cargo. She was part of Convoy DN-68, sailing northwards in the Indian Ocean for dispersal along the East African coast.

At 19:41 hrs on 20 August, Daronia was positioned between South Africa and Madagascar at 31°10′S 38°00′E when the Kriegsmarine Type IXD U-boat U-861, commanded by Korvettenkapitän Jürgen Oesten, struck her with two torpedoes. Despite the hits, Daronia did not sink, and Captain Ritchie managed to return the ship safely to Durban, where she arrived on 26 August. She remained there for the remainder of World War II. After the war, Daronia was repaired and returned to service in February 1946.

== Bombed by the CIA ==
Balikpapan in Kalimantan, Indonesia, where a CIA bomb hit Daronia.

On 28 April 1958, Daronia was in Balikpapan Harbour, in the East Kalimantan Province of Borneo, when a Douglas B-26 Invader bomber aircraft, flown by the CIA and painted black with no markings, attacked the Shell oil terminal there. The Invader first bombed a larger tanker, Eagle Oil and Shipping's San Flaviano, setting her on fire and sinking her, and then attacked Daronia.

Daronia and her sister ships had unusually high ventilators for their mid-ship pump rooms. The B-26 dropped a 500-pound (227-kg) bomb that hit her port ventilator. However, instead of exploding, it bounced off toward her starboard ventilator and then fell harmlessly into the sea. Daronia had a full load of petrol, so if the bomb had detonated, the effects would almost certainly have been catastrophic.

As a consequence, Daronia left Balikpapan that same day for the safety of Singapore, taking with her 26 of San Flaviano's rescued crew. A further 24 crew from San Flaviano followed a few days later on another Anglo-Saxon tanker, Dromus. Shell also evacuated shore-based families to Singapore and suspended its tanker service to Balikpapan.

In June 1958, both the Indonesian and UK governments claimed that the aircraft had been flown by Indonesian rebels. In reality, only the radio operator was from the Permesta rebels in North Sulawesi. The B-26, its bombs, and its pilot, former USAAF officer William H. Beale, were sent by the CIA as part of a US covert operation supporting the rebellion. The CIA pilots had orders to target foreign merchant ships to discourage trade in Indonesian waters, thereby weakening the Indonesian economy and destabilizing President Sukarno's government. Shell's suspension of operations and partial evacuation of personnel was precisely the intended outcome of the CIA attack.

For some months prior, UK Prime Minister Harold Macmillan and Foreign Secretary Selwyn Lloyd had supported US policy to supply Permesta. On 6 May 1958, more than a week after the CIA sank San Flaviano and hit Daronia, Lloyd secretly informed US Secretary of State John Foster Dulles that he maintained his support for this policy. On 18 May, Indonesian forces shot down another Permesta B-26 and captured its CIA pilot, Allen Pope. Nevertheless, in June 1958 both Indonesia and the UK publicly continued to claim that the aircraft had been flown by Indonesian rebels, concealing the CIA involvement of which both governments were fully aware.

== Withdrawal and scrapping ==
The tanker Daronia remained in service with Shell until 1960. In November of that year, she was scrapped in Hong Kong.

== Sources ==
- Conboy, Kenneth; Morrison, James (1999). Feet to the Fire CIA Covert Operations in Indonesia, 1957–1958. Annapolis: Naval Institute Press. ISBN 1-55750-193-9.
- Kahin, Audrey R; Kahin, George McT (1997) [1995]. Subversion as Foreign Policy The Secret Eisenhower and Dulles Debacle in Indonesia. Seattle and London: University of Washington Press. ISBN 0-295-97618-7.
