= Dromus =

Dromus may refer to:

- Dromus (mollusc), a monotypic genus of freshwater mussel
- MV Dromus, a British oil tanker launched in 1938
