= MV Dromus =

British oil tanker

History

United Kingdom
- Name: Dromus
- Namesake: The dromedary naiad, Dromus dromas
- Owner: Anglo-Saxon Petroleum
- Operator: Royal Dutch Shell
- Port of registry: London
- Builder: Harland and Wolff, Belfast, Northern Ireland
- Yard number: 1009
- Launched: September 1938
- Out of service: 1962
- Identification: Call sign GQGB
- Fate: Scrapped 1962 at Yokosuka, Japan

General characteristics
- Type: Oil tanker
- Tonnage: 8,036 GRT
- Length: 465.6 ft (141.9 m)
- Beam: 59.5 ft (18.1 m)
- Draught: 33.9 ft (10.3 m)
- Propulsion: diesel
- Crew: 37

MV Dromus was a 1930s British oil tanker owned by Anglo-Saxon Petroleum, a British subsidiary of Royal Dutch Shell. She was launched in September 1938 by Harland and Wolff at Belfast in Northern Ireland. She was one of a class of 20 similar tankers built for Anglo-Saxon.

In 1951 Dromus suffered an explosion and fire that killed 22 of her crew and five oil terminal staff, after which she was extensively repaired. In 1958 she rescued 24 members of the crew of a British tanker that had been sunk by the CIA. Shell retired Dromus from service in 1962 and she was scrapped that year.

== 1951 explosion in Singapore ==
In August 1951 Dromus was in Singapore, and on 18 August she took on a new crew for a voyage to the Philippines. On the night of 19–20 August Dromus was loading at Wharf Number 6 of the oil terminal on the island of Pulau Bukom off Singapore. During the process of topping up one of her forward tanks there was an overflow of oil from her foredeck and at about 0050 hrs she suffered an explosion and fire that took hold from her forecastle as far aft as her central superstructure.

Dromus' crew and Pulau Bukom's fire-fighting squad fought the fire. Dromus' Master, Henry Watkins had her stern mooring cables cut to help get her away from the wharf and for more than an hour, efforts were made to distance Dromus from the oil terminal to prevent the fire from spreading. Two Singapore Harbour Board fire-fighting tugs, Griper and Tarik, came to assist, along with five water-boats belonging to Hammer and Company based on Pulau Bukom. The explosion woke hundreds of Shell employees living 1 mile (1.6 km) away. They came to the terminal to help fight the fire, while their wives went to Singapore General Hospital to help to receive the injured.

There was a second explosion about 20 minutes after the first, probably caused by Dromus' flexible hose parting company. Survivors leapt into the sea and swam to safety under petrol that had spilled onto the water around the ship. The fire worsened until about 0230 hrs.

The disaster killed three European officers and 22 Chinese and Malayans, including the ship's carpenter who was rescued but died in Singapore General Hospital of his injuries. The hospital treated at least eight other injured, including two officers. Two crew initially listed as missing were later found safe: late on the afternoon of 20 August Dromus' terrified bosun and quartermaster were found sheltering behind bushes on the far side of Pulau Bukom, 1 mile (1.6 km) from the disaster scene. Most of the dead were from Dromus' crew, but five staff of the Pulau Bukom oil terminal were also among those killed. It took days to find the bodies of some of the missing, and 11 victims' bodies were so badly injured that they were never identified. For the first few days there was some confusion to the total number of dead and missing.

Despite the explosion, Dromus still contained a cargo of 8,000 tons of benzene and 2,000 tons of fuel oil that survived the fire. After the fire was put out and the ship made safe, the cargo was discharged at Pulau Bukom.

=== Aftermath ===
In the days immediately after the disaster the Port of Singapore's Deputy Master Attendant (equivalent to a Deputy Port Master) held an initial inquiry that was completed on 29 August. In September 1951 the Governor of Singapore, Sir Franklin Gimson, ordered a Commission of Inquiry. The report of the Commission's findings was published in February 1952. Captain Watkins and his chief engineer, Kenneth Armstrong, were found to have acted correctly and fire precautions taken during loading were found to have been adequate. The officer of the watch was found to have failed to keep a close enough eye on the topping up process, but he was among the dead and so could not be interviewed or called to account. The report speculated, though without any actual evidence, that a member of the crew could have caused the accident by emerging from the crew quarters while smoking.

The three officers killed were the Chief Officer Edward Dyer, Second Officer Samuel Pilling and Third Officer Edwin Hearth. All three were buried at Bidadari Cemetery on 21 August. Ten of the Chinese victims were buried at the Chinese cemetery in Bukit Timah Road. In September 1951 Anglo-Saxon and Shell presented an organ to the Seafarers' Chapel in Singapore as a memorial to those killed on Dromus. The Bishop of Singapore, the Rt. Rev. Henry Baines, dedicated the organ and paid tribute to the services of the Merchant Navy and Royal Navy to Singapore's development and defence.

In July 1952 five people were honoured for their bravery in response to the explosion and fire. Queen Elizabeth II made Dromus' master, Henry Watkins, and chief engineer, Kenneth Armstrong, MBEs. British Empire Medals were awarded to three Malay firemen of the Pulau Bukom fire-fighting squad: Sergeant Baharun bin Mat, Corporal Rahman bin Mohammed and Corporal Mohammed Din bin Abdullah.

The fire gutted Dromus' forecastle, forward tanks and bridge. On 14 September 1951 she was drydocked in Singapore to begin a refit estimated at S$2,000,000. Dromus was fully repaired and in due course returned to service.

== 1958 rescue in Borneo ==
On 28 April 1958 at Balikpapan Harbour, in the East Kalimantan Province of Borneo, a Douglas B-26 Invader bomber aircraft, flown by the CIA and painted black and with no markings, attacked the Shell oil terminal there. The Invader bombed and sank Eagle Oil and Shipping's SS San Flaviano and made an unsuccessful attack on Anglo-Saxon Petroleum's MV Daronia.

Immediately after the attack Daronia left Balikpapan for the safety of Singapore, taking with her 26 of San Flaviano's rescued crew. A few days later Dromus assisted by taking a further 24 of San Flaviano's crew from Balikpapan to Singapore. Shell also evacuated shore-based wives and families to Singapore and suspended its tanker service to Balikpapan.

== Withdrawal and scrapping ==
Dromus remained in Shell service until 1962, when she was scrapped at Yokosuka, Japan.

== Successor ship ==
In 2004 Shell chartered the oil tanker Maersk Prime from the Danish shipping company Maersk and renamed her Dromus. Maersk Prime is a 110,000 ton oil tanker that was built in Dalian, China in 1999. In March 2010 her charter ended and she reverted to her original owners and name.

== Sources ==
- Conboy, Kenneth; Morrison, James (1999). Feet to the Fire CIA Covert Operations in Indonesia, 1957–1958. Annapolis: Naval Institute Press. ISBN 1-55750-193-9.
