= Ro-100 =

Ro-100 may refer to:

- Japanese submarine Ro-100, an Imperial Japanese Navy submarine commissioned in 1942 and sunk in 1943
- Ro-100-class submarine, a class of Imperial Japanese Navy submarines
