= Japanese submarine Ro-101 =

Ro-100-class submarine

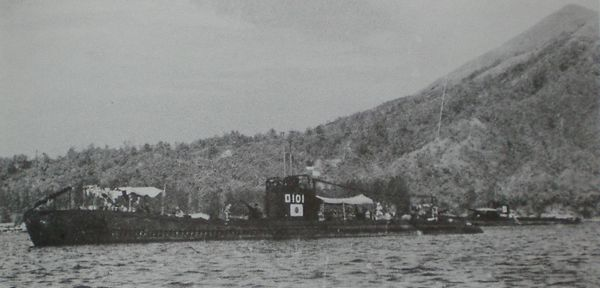
- Ro-101 at Rabaul in 1943.

History

Japan
- Name: Submarine No. 211
- Builder: Kawasaki, Kobe, Japan
- Laid down: 30 September 1941
- Renamed: Ro-101
- Launched: 17 April 1942
- Completed: 31 October 1942
- Commissioned: 31 October 1942
- Fate: Sunk 15 September 1943
- Stricken: 1 December 1943

General characteristics
- Class & type: Ro-100-class submarine
- Displacement: 611 tonnes (601 long tons) surfaced; 795 tonnes (782 long tons) submerged
- Length: 60.90 m (199 ft 10 in) overall
- Beam: 6.00 m (19 ft 8 in)
- Draft: 3.51 m (11 ft 6 in)
- Installed power: 1,000 bhp (750 kW) (diesel); 760 hp (570 kW) (electric motor)
- Propulsion: Diesel-electric; 1 × diesel engine; 1 × electric motor
- Speed: 14.2 knots (26.3 km/h; 16.3 mph) surfaced; 8 knots (15 km/h; 9.2 mph) submerged
- Range: 3,500 nmi (6,500 km; 4,000 mi) at 12 knots (22 km/h; 14 mph) surfaced; 60 nmi (110 km; 69 mi) at 3 knots (5.6 km/h; 3.5 mph) submerged
- Test depth: 75 m (246 ft)
- Crew: 38
- Armament: 4 × bow 533 mm (21 in) torpedo tubes; 2 × 25 mm (1 in) Type 96 anti-aircraft guns or 1 × 76.2 mm (3.00 in) L/40 AA gun

Ro-101 was an Imperial Japanese Navy Ro-100-class submarine. Completed and commissioned in October 1942, she served in World War II and operated in the Solomon Islands and the New Guinea area until she was sunk in September 1943 during her eighth war patrol.

== Design and description ==
The Ro-100 class was a medium-sized, coastal submarine derived from the preceding Kaichū type. They displaced 611 tonnes (601 long tons) surfaced and 795 tonnes (782 long tons) submerged. The submarines were 60.9 meters (199 ft 10 in) long, had a beam of 6 meters (19 ft 8 in) and a draft of 3.51 meters (11 ft 6 in). They had a double hull and a diving depth of 75 meters (246 ft).

For surface running, the boats were powered by two 500-brake-horsepower (373 kW) diesel engines, each driving one propeller shaft. When submerged each propeller was driven by a 380-horsepower (283 kW) electric motor. They could reach 14.2 knots (26.3 km/h; 16.3 mph) on the surface and 8 knots (15 km/h; 9.2 mph) underwater. On the surface, the Ro-100s had a range of 3,500 nautical miles (6,500 km; 4,000 mi) at 12 knots (22 km/h; 14 mph); submerged, they had a range of 60 nmi (110 km; 69 mi) at 3 knots (5.6 km/h; 3.5 mph).

The boats were armed with four internal bow 53.3 cm (21.0 in) torpedo tubes and carried a total of eight torpedoes. They were also armed with two single mounts for 25 mm (1 in) Type 96 anti-aircraft guns or a single 76.2 mm (3.00 in) L/40 AA gun.

== Construction and commissioning ==
Ro-101 was laid down as Submarine No. 211 on 30 September 1941 by Kawasaki at Kobe, Japan. She had been renamed Ro-101 by the time she was launched on 17 April 1942. She was completed and commissioned on 31 October 1942.

== Service history ==
=== October 1942–January 1943 ===
Upon commissioning, Ro-101 was attached to the Kure Submarine Squadron. After completing workups in the Seto Inland Sea, she proceeded to Yokosuka. On 18 January 1943, she departed Yokosuka bound for Truk, which she reached on 25 January 1943.

=== First war patrol ===
On 8 February 1943, Ro-101 departed Truk to begin her first war patrol, assigned a patrol area east of Port Moresby, New Guinea, to provide distant cover for Operation Ke, the Japanese evacuation of their forces on Guadalcanal which brought the Guadalcanal campaign to an end after six months of fighting. The patrol was uneventful, and on 8 February 1943, the day the Japanese completed Operation Ke, she concluded the patrol with her arrival at Rabaul on New Britain.

Ro-101, I-180, and Ro-108 (R to L) anchored in Rabaul, 9 September 1943

=== Second war patrol ===
Ro-101 got underway in company with the submarine Ro-103 from Rabaul on 9 February 1943 for her second war patrol, again bound for a patrol area east of Port Moresby. On 22 February 1943, her navigator sighted a 4,000-gross register ton steamer. After viewing the steamer through the periscope, Ro-101's commanding officer concluded that the steamer was a Q-ship, an antisubmarine decoy ship armed with hidden guns and depth charges. He decided to wait for dark to attack, but when the ship put on speed and headed off in the direction of Port Moresby, Ro-101 lost contact with it. Ro-101 departed her patrol area on 25 February and returned to Rabaul on 28 February 1943.

=== March 1943 ===
In the Battle of the Bismarck Sea, fought between 2 and 4 March 1943, United States Army Air Forces and Royal Australian Air Force aircraft and United States Navy PT boats annihilated a Japanese convoy in the Bismarck Sea that was attempting to carry the Imperial Japanese Army's 51st Division to Lae on New Guinea, sinking all eight ships of the convoy and four of the eight destroyers escorting them. Ro-101 got underway from Rabaul on the afternoon of 4 March 1943 to rescue survivors. On 7 March 1943, she picked up the commanding officer of the collier Nojima Maru and 44 infantrymen from lifeboats off the northern coast of New Guinea south of Dampier Strait.

Ro-101 called briefly at Rabaul on 8 March 1943 to discharge the survivors, then put back to sea the same day to come to the assistance of Ro-103, which had run aground on a reef off Kiriwina in the Trobriand Islands. Ro-103 freed herself on 11 March 1943 before Ro-101 could reach the scene, so Ro-101 received orders to return to Rabaul. She again got underway from Rabaul on 19 March 1943 to conduct a war patrol southeast of Guadalcanal, but she soon had to return when most of her crew fell ill with food poisoning.

=== Third war patrol ===
Ro-101 departed Rabaul on 21 March 1943 for her third war patrol, assigned a patrol area in the Solomon Islands and tasked with conducting air-sea rescue and weather reporting services in addition to attacking Allied ships while on patrol. On 5 April 1943 she received orders to proceed to Cape Esperance on the northwestern tip of Guadalcanal to rescue the crew of a Japanese bomber that had been shot down, but when she arrived in the Cape Esperance area U.S. Navy PT boats prevented her from carrying out the rescue. She returned to Rabaul on 12 April 1943.

=== Fourth war patrol ===
Ro-101 departed Rabaul on 30 April to begin her fourth war patrol, ordered to relieve the submarine Ro-102 in a patrol area in the Samarai Bight southeast of Rabi, New Guinea. She operated in that area from 10 to 17 May 1943, then headed back to Rabaul. While en route, she was off Cape St. George on New Ireland at 03:40 on 21 May 1943 when she sighted a four-engine bomber — probably the United States Army Air Forces B-17E Flying Fortress Honi Kuu Okole (Hawaiian for "Kiss My Heart"), which was operating from Dobodura Airfield on New Guinea that night when a Japanese Nakajima J1N1 (Allied reporting name "Irving") night fighter shot it down — crashing in flames and observed two parachutes from the plane. She arrived at Rabaul later that day. During her stay at Rabaul, she was fitted with a radar detector.

=== Fifth war patrol ===
Ro-101 departed Rabaul on 8 June 1943 for her fifth war patrol, assigned a patrol area east of Guadalcanal. She arrived in her patrol area on 12 June 1943, and on 17 June 1943 received orders to move to a new patrol area in the vicinity of Munda and Gatukai Island in the New Georgia Islands. She was ordered to return to Rabaul on 29 June 1943, but before she left her patrol area, the New Georgia campaign began on 30 June 1943 with the U.S. landings on New Georgia, Rendova, and other islands in the central Solomon Islands. Ro-101 sighted U.S. landing craft while submerged off Munda that day and reported them to Submarine Squadron 7. She was ordered to approach from west of Rendova and attack ships off the U.S. landing area at Munda, but she was unable to penetrate the PT boat screen protecting the beachhead. She made a second attempt on 2 July 1943, but again failed to penetrate the PT boat screen, and after she withdrew to recharge her batteries she received orders to return to Rabaul, which she reached on 3 July 1943.

=== Sixth war patrol ===
On 8 July 1943, Ro-101 began her sixth war patrol, ordered to return to the central Solomon Islands and attack ships in Kula Gulf off the U.S. beachhead at Rice Anchorage on the northern coast of New Georgia. While she was on the surface recharging her batteries in Kula Gulf on 12 July 1943 at approximately 08°00′S 157°19′E, the U.S. Navy destroyer USS Taylor, escorting a convoy, detected her on radar at 16:50. Taylor closed the range, and at 16:54 her lookouts sighted Ro-101's conning tower at a distance of only 2,500 feet (760 m). Taylor illuminated Ro-101 with a searchlight and opened fire, immediately killing the submarine's torpedo officer and two of her lookouts. Ro-101's commanding officer had to move their bodies out of the way so that he could gain access to the conning tower hatch, and after he entered the conning tower and the hatch was closed, Ro-101 belatedly crash-dived. She went out of control during the dive, reaching 460 feet (140 m), and had to blow her main ballast tanks to arrest her descent. At 17:10 Taylor dropped two depth charges, which damaged one of Ro-101's periscopes.

Some historians have credited Taylor with sinking either I-25 or Ro-107, but her actual target, Ro-101, survived. She remained submerged for two hours after Taylor's depth-charge attack, and her interior temperature rose to 104 °F (40 °C) before she surfaced toward evening. She headed for the northwest coast of Kolombangara so her crew could inspect her damage and make repairs. The crew found several dents in her hull and determined that her damaged periscope required replacement.

After sunset, Ro-101's crew observed searchlights and heard heavy gunfire to seaward as U.S. and Japanese warships fought the Battle of Kolombangara. In its aftermath, she received orders to rescue survivors from the light cruiser Jintsū, which had been sunk in the battle, but her damage prevented her from carrying out the orders. She headed for Rabaul, and while she was on the surface recharging her batteries west of Shortland Island on the afternoon of 13 July 1943, an Allied patrol plane attacked, dropping two bombs as she crash-dived and knocking out her remaining periscope. She reached Rabaul on 14 July 1943 and began repairs, which took three weeks.

=== Seventh war patrol ===
After completion of her repairs, Ro-101 got underway from Rabaul on 7 August 1943 to begin her seventh war patrol, ordered to return to the Kolombangara area. At around 01:00 on 18 August 1943, her commanding officer observed the flashes of gunfire to the north through her periscope as U.S. and Japanese destroyers fought the Battle off Horaniu. At 02:00, she made sound contact on the propeller noises of destroyers in New Georgia Sound, and she quickly set up an attack and fired four torpedoes at the second destroyer in the column at a range of only 600 yards (550 m), but they all passed astern because the destroyer was making 30 knots (56 km/h; 35 mph) and Ro-101′s commanding officer had underestimated her speed.

On 20 August 1943, Ro-101 was reassigned to Submarine Division 51 along with the submarine Ro-100. She returned to Rabaul on 26 August 1943. Her commanding officer received orders to relinquish his command for a new assignment after her return, but her new commanding officer was killed on 28 August 1943 when a U.S Navy PB4Y-1 Liberator shot down the Kawanishi H6K (Allied reporting name "Mavis") flying boat on which he was a passenger off Bougainville during a flight from Truk to Rabaul. Another officer was selected to replace him as her new commanding officer.

=== Eighth war patrol ===
Ro-101 departed Simpson Harbour at Rabaul on 10 September 1943 for her eighth war patrol. She was assigned a patrol area in the southeastern Solomon Islands southeast of San Cristobal.

=== Loss ===
On 15 September 1943, a Japanese submarine attacked a convoy of two cargo ships bound for Espiritu Santo in the New Hebrides as the convoy passed through the southern end of Indispensable Strait near Guadalcanal. The convoy's escorts — the light minelayer USS Montgomery and the destroyer USS Saufley — sighted a torpedo wake at 10:11. Montgomery's sound gear was broken, but Saufley began to search for the attacking submarine by steaming down the torpedo's track, and she gained sonar contact on a submerged submarine at a range of 3,000 yards (2,700 m). Saufley made five depth-charge attacks over the next three and a half hours, and the submarine surfaced at 14:43. Saufley opened fire on the submarine's conning tower with her 5-inch (127 mm) guns and machine guns, and a PBY-5 Catalina flying boat of U.S. Navy Patrol Squadron 23 (VP-23) arrived on the scene and dropped two depth charges. The first missed, but the second hit the submarine, which disappeared beneath the surface at 14:46. Saufley's crew then heard a large underwater explosion, and by 17:35 a slick of diesel oil covered a 1-square-nautical-mile (3.4 km^{2}; 1.3 sq mi) area of the ocean's surface centered around 10°57′S 163°56′E.

The submarine Saufley and the PBY sank probably was Ro-101. On 11 October 1943, the Imperial Japanese Navy declared her to be presumed lost in the Solomon Islands with all 50 hands. The Japanese struck her from the Navy list on 1 December 1943.
