= SS San Flaviano =

1950s British oil tanker sunk by the CIA

History

United Kingdom
- Name: San Flaviano
- Namesake: Archbishop Flavian of Constantinople
- Owner: Eagle Oil and Shipping Company
- Operator: Royal Dutch Shell
- Builder: Cammell Laird, Birkenhead
- Yard number: 1242
- Launched: 12 June 1956
- Completed: September 1956
- Out of service: 28 April 1958
- Identification: UK official number 187459; IMO no. 1187459
- Fate: Bombed and sunk by the CIA

General characteristics
- Type: Oil tanker
- Tonnage: 12,278 GRT, 6,953 NRT, 18,219 DWT
- Displacement: 19,349 tons
- Length: 556.9 ft (169.7 m)
- Beam: 69.5 ft (21.2 m)
- Draught: 29 ft 9 in (9.07 m)
- Depth: 39.0 ft (11.9 m)
- Installed power: 8,250 SHP
- Propulsion: steam turbines
- Speed: 14 kn (26 km/h)
- Crew: 53

SS San Flaviano was a British oil tanker owned by Eagle Oil and Shipping Company, a British subsidiary of Royal Dutch Shell. She was built by Cammell Laird in England in 1956 and attacked and sunk by the CIA in Borneo in 1958.

San Flaviano had a sister ship, San Fortunato, built by Cammell Laird in the same year. The two ships were part of a substantial investment programme to renew Eagle Oil's fleet with larger and more modern tankers. Between 1950 and 1960 the company took delivery of at least 16 new tankers.

== Building ==
Cammell Laird built San Flaviano as yard number 1242. She was launched on 12 June 1956 and completed that September. Her registered length was 556.9 ft (169.7 m), her beam was 69.5 ft (21.2 m) and her depth was 39.0 ft (11.9 m). Her tonnages were 12,278 GRT, 6,953 NRT and 18,219 DWT.

San Flaviano was a steamship. A pair of steam turbines drove her single screw. Her turbines' combined power output was rated at 8,250 SHP, giving her a speed of 14 kn (26 km/h).

Eagle Oil registered San Flaviano in London. Her UK official number was 187459, which later became the IMO number 1187459.

== Bombed and sunk by the CIA ==
Balikpapan in Kalimantan, Indonesia, where a CIA aircraft bombed and sank San Flaviano.

San Flaviano's career was cut short in 1958. On 28 April San Flaviano was in Balikpapan Harbour, in the East Kalimantan Province of Borneo, when a Douglas B-26 Invader bomber aircraft, flown by the CIA and painted black and with no markings, bombed and sank her.

San Flaviano had nearly finished discharging a cargo of crude oil, leaving her tanks full of highly flammable gas. The CIA aircraft hit San Flaviano with one or more 500-pound (227-kg) bombs amidships on her starboard side. Fire and explosions spread rapidly along that side of the ship, either destroying her starboard lifeboats or making them inaccessible. Nevertheless, her officers and crew launched both port lifeboats within four minutes, successfully evacuating everyone including a passenger, the Chief Officer's wife. San Flaviano sank near the entrance of Balikpapan harbour.

In response, Royal Dutch Shell suspended its tanker service to Balikpapan and evacuated shore-based wives and families to Singapore. Most of San Flaviano's complement were also evacuated to Singapore, travelling on two oil tankers of Anglo-Saxon Petroleum, another of Royal Dutch Shell's British subsidiaries. The first 26 from San Flaviano left that same day on Daronia, which had had a narrow escape in the same air raid. Another 24 from San Flaviano followed a few days later on MV Dromus, leaving the Master (Captain Jack Bright) and his senior officers as the only people from San Flaviano still in Balikpapan.

In June 1958 both the Indonesian and UK governments claimed that the aircraft had been flown by Indonesian rebels. In fact only the radio operator was from the Permesta rebels in North Sulawesi. The B-26, its 500 lb (230 kg) bombs and its pilot, former United States Army Air Forces officer William H. Beale, were sent by the CIA as part of US covert support for the rebellion. The CIA pilots had orders to target commercial shipping to drive foreign merchant ships away from Indonesian waters, thereby weakening the Indonesian economy and destabilising the Indonesian government of President Sukarno. Shell's suspension of operations and partial evacuation of personnel was exactly what the CIA attack was intended to achieve.

For some months previously, UK Prime Minister Harold Macmillan and Foreign Secretary Selwyn Lloyd had supported US policy to aid Permesta. On 6 May 1958, more than a week after the CIA sank San Flaviano, Lloyd secretly told US Secretary of State John Foster Dulles that this was still his position. On 18 May, Indonesian forces shot down a different Permesta B-26 and captured its CIA pilot, Allen Pope. Nevertheless, in June 1958 both Indonesia and the UK publicly claimed that the aircraft had been flown by Indonesian rebels, concealing the CIA involvement of which both governments were well aware.

== See also ==
- Springfjord – a British cargo ship napalmed by a CIA aircraft in Guatemala in 1954

== Sources ==
- Conboy, Kenneth; Morrison, James (1999). Feet to the Fire CIA Covert Operations in Indonesia, 1957–1958. Annapolis: Naval Institute Press. ISBN 1-55750-193-9.
- Kahin, Audrey R; Kahin, George McT (1997) [1995]. Subversion as Foreign Policy The Secret Eisenhower and Dulles Debacle in Indonesia. Seattle and London: University of Washington Press. ISBN 0-295-97618-7.
