= Mexican Eagle =

Mexican Eagle may refer to:

- Mexican Eagle Petroleum Company, a former Mexican oil company

Mexican eagle may refer to:

- American golden eagle (Aquila chrysaetos canadensis)
- Crested caracara (Caracara plancus)
