= William H. Beale =

US military and paramilitary aviator

William Beale
- Born: William Henry Beale Jr. October 25, 1920; Spokane, Washington, U.S.
- Died: April 6, 1962 (aged 41); Xieng Dat, Vientiane Province, Laos
- Spouse: Sung Ching Beale
- Military career
- Allegiance: United States of America
- Branch: United States Army Air Forces; Central Intelligence Agency
- Rank: Lieutenant colonel
- Conflicts: Second World War; Permesta Rebellion; US covert campaign in Laos

William Henry Beale Jr. (October 25, 1920 – April 6, 1962) was a US military and paramilitary aviator. In the Second World War, he was in the USAAF and flew bombing missions in the northern Pacific theater. In the Permesta rebellion in Indonesia in 1958 he flew bombing missions for the CIA. His career ended on a CIA covert mission in Laos in 1962 when he was killed in a plane crash.

== USAAF service ==
Beale was a USAAF officer in the Second World War who flew Consolidated B-24 Liberators from the Aleutian Islands and rose to the rank of lieutenant colonel. After the war, Beale spent several years training Republic of China Air Force (ROCAF) pilots on Republic F-84 Thunderjets. He married Sung Ching, the sister of a ROCAF fighter group commander, adopted her daughter and settled in Taiwan.

== AUREV service ==
Beale left the air force and joined Civil Air Transport, a CIA front organisation based in Taiwan. CAT valued Beale for his connections with the ROCAF hierarchy.

In April 1958, CAT sent Beale to Clark Air Base in the Philippines, where he was assigned a Douglas B-26 Invader that had been painted black and had its markings obscured. On April 19, 1958, Beale flew the bomber to Mapanget, a rebel-held Indonesian Air Force base on the Minahassa Peninsula of northern Sulawesi. The rebels were Permesta, led by dissident local army officers opposed to the government of President Sukarno. Beale and his B-26 formed part of the CIA element in Permesta's Angkatan Udara Revolusioner ("Revolutionary Air Force") or AUREV. Beale flew his first AUREV mission on April 20, attacked Palu, the provincial capital of Central Sulawesi, with four 500 lb (230 kg) bombs followed by machine-gun fire. On April 21 he made a similar attack on the Indonesian Air Force base on the island of Morotai, damaging the runway and setting a line of fuel drums on fire. In the next few days Beale flew two more sorties attacking Palu.

Very early on April 27 one of Beale's CAT colleagues, Allen Pope, brought a second CIA B-26 from Clark to Mapanget. Later that morning Pope flew to attack Morotai ahead of a Permesta amphibious assault while Beale flew to Ambon Island further south. Beale attacked Ambon City, the provincial capital, setting on fire a military command post, a fuel depot and a Royal Dutch Shell complex.

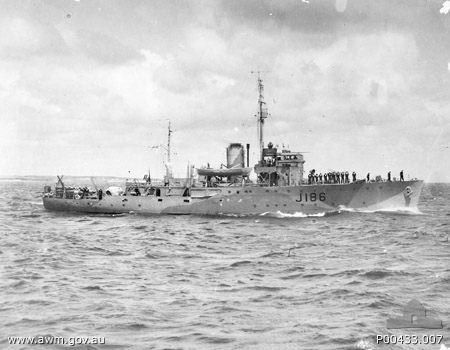
On April 28, 1958, Beale bombed and sank the Indonesian Navy corvette KRI Hang Tuah, killing 18 crew and wounding another 28. This photo shows Hang Tuah in her original guise as the RAN Bathurst-class corvette HMAS Ipswich.

The CIA instructed CAT pilots to target commercial shipping in order to drive foreign merchant ships away from Indonesian waters, thereby weakening the Indonesian economy and undermining Sukarno's government. On the morning of April 28 Beale attacked Balikpapan on the south coast of East Kalimantan province in Borneo. He first hit the airfield with a bomb in the middle of the runway, and then turned to attack the Royal Dutch Shell oil terminal in Balikpapan harbor. He bombed, set ablaze and sank the British 12,278 ton oil tanker SS San Flaviano, that belonged to Eagle Oil and Shipping, a subsidiary of Royal Dutch Shell. He then aimed a bomb at a second British tanker, the 8,139 ton MV Daronia, that belonged to another Royal Dutch Shell subsidiary, Anglo-Saxon Petroleum. However, the bomb bounced off one of Daronia's ventilators amidships without detonating and landed harmlessly in the sea. Beale then machine-gunned and destroyed Royal Dutch Shell's oil pipes to its wharf. With the last of his 500 lb bombs, Beale turned seaward and sank an Indonesian Navy Bathurst-class corvette, KRI Hang Tuah, killing 18 crew and seriously wounding another 28.

The CIA's plan to intimidate foreign trade quickly scored its first success. Royal Dutch Shell suspended its tanker service to Balikpapan and evacuated shore-based wives and families to Singapore.

After his raid on Balikpapan, Beale returned to Mapanget and re-armed. On the afternoon of the same day he attacked Ambon City, hitting and slightly damaging the Indonesian Army barracks next to the marketplace. On April 30, Beale returned to Ambon and bombed the airstrip again. On May 1, Beale and his B-26 returned to Clark Air Base for a rest.

Early on May 9, Beale returned to Mapanget, releasing Pope who then took his turn to go on leave. Later that same morning, Beale attacked Ambon again. Ambon now had several 12.7 mm (0.5 in) machine guns with which it gave anti-aircraft fire. An Indonesian Air Force North American P-51 Mustang chased Beale's B-26 but failed to catch it.

On May 10, Beale with his B-26, plus two Philippine Air Force pilots flying AUREV P-51 fighters, attacked Amahai airfield on the island of Seram, destroying an Indonesian Air Force P-51 on the ground. On May 12–13 Beale and the two Filipinos flew two sorties over Central Sulawesi, inflicting heavy damage. On the afternoon of May 13 Beale and his B-26 attacked Ambon again, this time accompanied by an AUREV Consolidated PBY Catalina flown by CIA agent Connie W Seigrist. Off Ambon, Beale strafed and holed a large sailing vessel, which then settled atop a coral reef.

Beale tired of both the heavy flying schedule and personality clashes at Mapanget air base. By May 15 he had quit the operation, leaving Pope as the sole B-26 bomber pilot. The operation did not last much longer. On May 18, Pope attacked an amphibious landing force that was steaming from Ambon to re-take the islands of Morotai and Halmahera. Pope was shot down and captured, exposing the USA's sponsorship of the Permesta rebellion. Embarrassed, the Eisenhower administration terminated CIA support for Permesta and withdrew its agents and remaining aircraft from AUREV.

== Covert operations in Laos ==
After the U.S. aborted its CIA attack on Indonesia, Beale remained in CAT service. In 1959 the CIA airline became Air America, and by 1962 Beale was flying covert missions in support of U.S. covert operations in Laos. On April 2, 1962, Beale was in a de Havilland Canada DHC-2 Beaver trying to take off from an airstrip in northeastern Laos. The DHC-2 was overloaded, failed to become airborne and crashed at the end of the runway, killing all on board. He died from severe burns over 100 percent of his body.

== Sources ==
- Conboy, Kenneth; Morrison, James (1999). Feet to the Fire CIA Covert Operations in Indonesia, 1957–1958. Annapolis: Naval Institute Press. ISBN 1-55750-193-9.
