= SS Dordogne =

Steam-powered oil tanker that served the French Navy

History

United Kingdom; France
- Name: SS San Isidoro; SS Dordogne
- Namesake: St. Isidore of Seville; Dordogne
- Owner: Eagle Oil & Shipping Co. Ltd. (1914); French Navy (1914–40)
- Builder: Armstrong Whitworth
- Yard number: 852
- Launched: 17 December 1913
- Completed: March 1914
- Identification: Official number 1136646
- Fate: Scuttled 18 June 1940

General characteristics
- Class & type: Oil tanker
- Tonnage: 12,500 DWT
- Displacement: 7,333 tons
- Length: 530 ft (160 m)
- Beam: 66 ft 6 in (20.27 m)
- Draught: 29 ft (8.8 m)
- Installed power: 4,100 IHP
- Propulsion: single shaft driven by steam engine with two boilers
- Speed: 11 knots (20 km/h; 13 mph)

SS Dordogne was a steam-powered oil tanker that served the French Navy. She was formerly a British merchant ship, SS San Isidoro, of the Eagle Oil Transport Company.

== History ==
In 1912 Weetman Pearson, 1st Viscount Cowdray founded the Eagle Oil Transport Company to transport oil from his Mexican Eagle Petroleum Company's oilfields in Mexico to the United Kingdom. The company ordered a fleet of 20 tankers from British shipyards. They included the sister ships San Isidoro and San Onofre from Armstrong Whitworth at Hebburn on the River Tyne in north-east England.

The French government bought SS San Isidoro in the year she was launched and renamed her Dordogne. She was scuttled at Brest in the Fall of France on 18 June 1940.

== Sources ==
- Le Masson, Henri (1969). The French Navy. Navies of the Second World War. Vol. 2. London: MacDonald & Co. (Publishers) Ltd. pp. 80–82. ISBN 9780356023847.
