= Japanese submarine Ro-107 =

Japanese submarine

History

Japan
- Name: Submarine No. 217
- Builder: Kure Naval Arsenal, Kure, Japan
- Laid down: 30 June 1941
- Renamed: Ro-107 on 8 April 1942
- Launched: 30 May 1942
- Completed: 26 December 1942
- Commissioned: 26 December 1942
- Fate: Missing after 6 July 1943
- Stricken: 1 September 1943

Service record
- Part of: Kure Submarine Squadron; Submarine Squadron 7
- Commanders: Naoichi Egi; 26 December 1942 – July 1943

General characteristics
- Class & type: Ro-100-class submarine
- Displacement: 611 tonnes (601 long tons) surfaced; 795 tonnes (782 long tons) submerged
- Length: 60.90 m (199 ft 10 in) overall
- Beam: 6.00 m (19 ft 8 in)
- Draft: 3.51 m (11 ft 6 in)
- Installed power: 1,000 bhp (750 kW) (diesel); 760 hp (570 kW) (electric motor)
- Propulsion: Diesel-electric; 1 × diesel engine; 1 × electric motor
- Speed: 14.2 knots (26.3 km/h; 16.3 mph) surfaced; 8 knots (15 km/h; 9.2 mph) submerged
- Range: 3,500 nmi (6,500 km; 4,000 mi) at 12 knots (22 km/h; 14 mph) surfaced; 60 nmi (110 km; 69 mi) at 3 knots (5.6 km/h; 3.5 mph) submerged
- Test depth: 75 m (246 ft)
- Crew: 38
- Armament: 4 × bow 533 mm (21 in) torpedo tubes; 2 × 25 mm (1 in) Type 96 anti-aircraft guns or 1 × 76.2 mm (3.00 in) L/40 AA gun

Ro-107 was an Imperial Japanese Navy Ro-100-class submarine. Completed and commissioned in December 1942, she served in World War II, operating in the Solomon Islands. She disappeared in July 1943 during her third war patrol.

== Design and description ==
The Ro-100 class was a medium-sized, coastal submarine derived from the preceding Kaichū type. They displaced 611 tonnes (601 long tons) surfaced and 795 tonnes (782 long tons) submerged. The submarines were 60.9 meters (199 ft 10 in) long, had a beam of 6 meters (19 ft 8 in) and a draft of 3.51 meters (11 ft 6 in). They had a double hull and a diving depth of 75 meters (246 ft).

For surface running, the boats were powered by two 500-brake-horsepower (373 kW) diesel engines, each driving one propeller shaft. When submerged each propeller was driven by a 380-horsepower (283 kW) electric motor. They could reach 14.2 knots (26.3 km/h; 16.3 mph) on the surface and 8 knots (15 km/h; 9.2 mph) underwater. On the surface, the Ro-100s had a range of 3,500 nautical miles (6,500 km; 4,000 mi) at 12 knots (22 km/h; 14 mph); submerged, they had a range of 60 nmi (110 km; 69 mi) at 3 knots (5.6 km/h; 3.5 mph).

The boats were armed with four internal bow 53.3 cm (21.0 in) torpedo tubes and carried a total of eight torpedoes. They were also armed with two single mounts for 25 mm (1 in) Type 96 anti-aircraft guns or a single 76.2 mm (3.00 in) L/40 AA gun.

== Construction and commissioning ==
Ro-107 was laid down as Submarine No. 217 on 17 December 1941 by the Kure Naval Arsenal at Kure, Japan. Renamed Ro-107 on 8 April 1942, she was launched on 17 December 1941. She was completed and commissioned on 26 December 1942, under the command of Lieutenant Commander Naoichi Egi.

== Service history ==
Upon commissioning, Ro-107 was attached to the Sasebo Naval District and was assigned to the Kure Submarine Squadron for workups. On 15 March 1943, she was reassigned to Submarine Squadron 7 in the 8th Fleet in the Southeast Area Fleet. She departed Sasebo on 31 March 1943 bound for Rabaul on New Britain, which she reached on 12 April 1943.

=== First and second war patrols ===
Ro-107 got underway from Rabaul on 22 April 1943 for her first war patrol, assigned a patrol area east of Guadalcanal in the Solomon Islands. The patrol was uneventful, and she returned to Rabaul on 14 May 1943. She put back to sea on 27 May 1943 to begin her second war patrol, again bound for the waters east of Guadalcanal. After another quiet patrol, she set course for Rabaul, where she arrived on 20 June 1943.

=== Third war patrol ===
On 30 June 1943, the New Georgia campaign began when U.S. forces landed on New Georgia, Rendova, and other islands in the central Solomons. Ro-107 left Rabaul that day to begin her third war patrol, assigned a patrol area off Rendova. On 6 July 1943, she transmitted a message from a position east of Rendova. The Japanese never heard from her again.

=== Loss ===
The circumstances of Ro-107′s loss remain a mystery. On 1 August 1943, the Imperial Japanese Navy declared her to be presumed lost in the Solomon Islands with all 42 men on board. The Japanese struck her from the Navy list on 1 September 1943.

Some historians have credited the United States Navy submarine chaser USS SC-669 with sinking Ro-107 off the entrance to the harbor at Espiritu Santo in the New Hebrides in May 1943, but Ro-107 was active until July 1943. Another account of her loss suggests that the U.S. Navy destroyer USS Radford (DD-446) sank her on 7 July 1943, but Radford reported that she attacked a submarine on 1 July 1943, before Ro-107′s last message, rather than on 7 July 1943. The U.S. Navy destroyer USS Taylor (DD-468) erroneously received credit for sinking a Japanese submarine in Kula Gulf on 12 July 1943 and Taylor′s victim has been widely identified by historians as Ro-107, although some historians have claimed Taylor sank I-25. Taylor′s target actually was Ro-101, which survived.
