= HMAS Ipswich (J186) =

Bathurst-class corvette

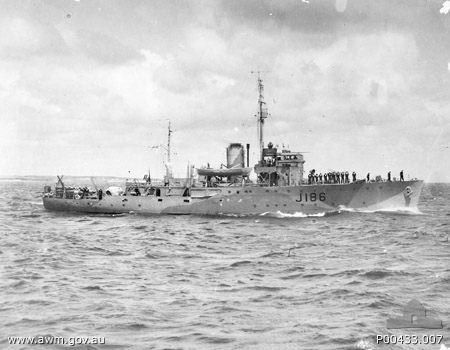
- HMAS Ipswich in 1944

History

Australia
- Namesake: City of Ipswich, Queensland
- Builder: Evans Deakin & Co, Brisbane
- Laid down: 6 March 1941
- Launched: 11 August 1941
- Commissioned: 13 June 1942
- Decommissioned: 5 July 1946
- Honours and awards: Battle honours: Pacific 1942; Indian Ocean 1942–45; Sicily 1943; East Indies 1944; Okinawa 1945
- Fate: Transferred to the Netherlands
- Badge

Netherlands
- Name: Morotai
- Namesake: Morotai Island
- Commissioned: 5 July 1946
- Decommissioned: 1949
- Fate: Transferred to Indonesia

Indonesia
- Name: Hang Tuah
- Namesake: Hang Tuah
- Commissioned: 1949
- Fate: Sunk by CIA air attack; 28 April 1958

General characteristics
- Class & type: Bathurst-class corvette
- Displacement: 650 tons (standard), 1,025 tons (full war load)
- Length: 186 ft (57 m)
- Beam: 31 ft (9.4 m)
- Draught: 8.5 ft (2.6 m)
- Propulsion: triple-expansion steam engine, 2 shafts, 2,000 hp
- Speed: 15 knots (28 km/h; 17 mph) at 1,750 hp
- Complement: 85
- Armament: 1 × 12-pounder gun; (later replaced by 1 × 4 inch Mk XIX gun); 3 × Oerlikon 20 mm cannons (later 2); 1 × 40 mm gun (installed later); Machine guns; Depth charges, chutes and throwers

A CIA aircraft sank Hang Tuah just off Balikpapan in Kalimantan, Indonesia.

HMAS Ipswich (J186/B244/A118), named for the city of Ipswich, Queensland, was one of 60 Bathurst-class corvettes built during World War II and one of 20 built on Admiralty order but manned by personnel of and later commissioned into the Royal Australian Navy (RAN).

Ipswich was later operated by the Royal Netherlands Navy (RNLN) as HNLMS Morotai, and by the Indonesian Navy (TNI-AL) as KRI Hang Tuah. In Indonesian service in 1958 the ship was attacked by a CIA aircraft and sunk with considerable loss of life.

== Design and construction ==
In 1938, the Australian Commonwealth Naval Board (ACNB) identified the need for a general purpose 'local defence vessel' capable of both anti-submarine and mine-warfare duties, while easy to construct and operate. The vessel was initially envisaged as having a displacement of approximately 500 tons, a speed of at least 10 knots (19 km/h; 12 mph), and a range of 2,000 nautical miles (3,700 km; 2,300 mi) The opportunity to build a prototype in the place of a cancelled Bar-class boom defence vessel saw the proposed design increased to a 680-ton vessel, with a 15.5 knots (28.7 km/h; 17.8 mph) top speed, and a range of 2,850 nautical miles (5,280 km; 3,280 mi), armed with a 4-inch (102 mm) gun, equipped with asdic, and able to fitted with either depth charges or minesweeping equipment depending on the planned operations: although closer in size to a sloop than a local defence vessel, the resulting increased capabilities were accepted due to advantages over British-designed mine warfare and anti-submarine vessels. Construction of the prototype HMAS Kangaroo did not go ahead, but the plans were retained. The need for locally built 'all-rounder' vessels at the start of World War II saw the "Australian Minesweepers" (designated as such to hide their anti-submarine capability, but popularly referred to as "corvettes") approved in September 1939, with 60 constructed during the course of the war: 36 ordered by the RAN, 20 (including Ipswich) ordered by the British Admiralty but manned and commissioned as RAN vessels, and 4 for the Royal Indian Navy.

Ipswich was laid down by Evans Deakin & Co at Brisbane in Queensland on 6 March 1941. She was launched on 11 August 1941 by Evelyn Foll, wife of the Minister for the Interior Harry Foll, and commissioned on 13 June 1942.

== Operational history ==
=== RAN ===
Ipswich was employed from commissioning until 3 November 1942 as a convoy escort in Australian waters. From 3 November 1942 until 21 January 1945, Ipswich was assigned to the British Eastern Fleet, primarily serving in the Indian Ocean and Persian Gulf, but spending May to October 1943 in the Mediterranean. During this time, Ipswich was credited with shooting down a twin-engined bomber near Syracuse on 25 July 1943, and on 11 February 1944 worked with HMAS Launceston and HMIS Jumna to sink the Japanese submarine Ro-110.

Upon leaving the British Eastern Fleet, Ipswich returned to Australia, where she was assigned to the British Pacific Fleet. Ipswich was present in Tokyo Bay on Victory over Japan Day (2 September 1945), when the Japanese Instrument of Surrender was signed.

Ipswich earned five battle honours for her wartime service: "Pacific 1942", "Indian Ocean 1942–45", "Sicily 1943", "East Indies 1944", and "Okinawa 1945".

=== RNLN ===
Ipswich paid off from RAN service on 5 July 1946 and was transferred to the Royal Netherlands Navy and renamed HNLMS Morotai.

=== TNI-AL ===
Morotai was transferred to the Indonesian Navy in 1949 and renamed KRI Hang Tuah. On 28 April 1958 a Douglas B-26 Invader aircraft, painted black and showing no markings, bombed and sank her off Balikpapan in southern Borneo. 18 crew were killed and another 28 were wounded.

The B-26's co-pilot was Colonel Muharto of the Permesta rebel movement's AUREV insurgent air force but the aircraft, its ammunition and pilot were supplied by the CIA as part of an insurgency to destabilise President Sukarno's government. The pilot was William H. Beale, a former United States Army Air Forces lieutenant colonel then employed by a Taiwan-based CIA front organisation, Civil Air Transport.
