= Japanese submarine Ro-110 =

Ro-100-class submarine

History

Japan
- Name: Submarine No. 401
- Builder: Kawasaki, Kobe, Japan
- Laid down: 20 August 1942
- Renamed: Ro-110
- Launched: 26 January 1943
- Completed: 6 July 1943
- Commissioned: 6 July 1943
- Fate: Sunk 11 February 1944
- Stricken: 30 April 1944

General characteristics
- Class & type: Ro-100-class submarine
- Displacement: 611 tonnes (601 long tons) surfaced; 795 tonnes (782 long tons) submerged
- Length: 60.90 m (199 ft 10 in) overall
- Beam: 6.00 m (19 ft 8 in)
- Draft: 3.51 m (11 ft 6 in)
- Installed power: 1,000 bhp (750 kW) (diesel); 760 hp (570 kW) (electric motor)
- Propulsion: Diesel-electric; 1 × diesel engine; 1 × electric motor
- Speed: 14.2 knots (26.3 km/h; 16.3 mph) surfaced; 8 knots (15 km/h; 9.2 mph) submerged
- Range: 3,500 nmi (6,500 km; 4,000 mi) at 12 knots (22 km/h; 14 mph) surfaced; 60 nmi (110 km; 69 mi) at 3 knots (5.6 km/h; 3.5 mph) submerged
- Test depth: 75 m (246 ft)
- Crew: 38
- Armament: 4 × bow 533 mm (21 in) torpedo tubes; 2 × 25 mm (1 in) Type 96 anti-aircraft guns or 1 × 76.2 mm (3.00 in) L/40 AA gun

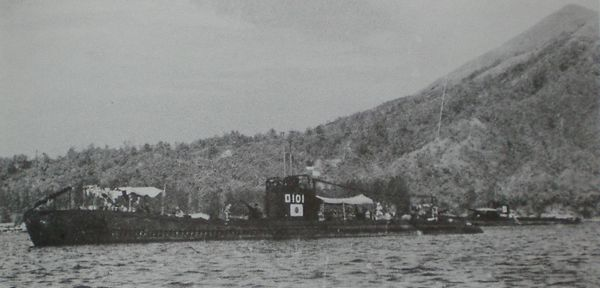
HIJMS Ro-101 in 1943

Ro-110 was an Imperial Japanese Navy Ro-100-class submarine. Completed and commissioned in July 1943, she served in World War II, operating in the Indian Ocean. She was sunk in February 1944 during her third war patrol.

== Design and description ==
The Ro-100 class was a medium-sized, coastal submarine derived from the preceding Kaichū type. They displaced 611 tonnes (601 long tons) surfaced and 795 tonnes (782 long tons) submerged. The submarines were 60.9 meters (199 ft 10 in) long, had a beam of 6 meters (19 ft 8 in) and a draft of 3.51 meters (11 ft 6 in). They had a double hull and a diving depth of 75 meters (246 ft).

For surface running, the boats were powered by two 500-brake-horsepower (373 kW) diesel engines, each driving one propeller shaft. When submerged each propeller was driven by a 380-horsepower (283 kW) electric motor. They could reach 14.2 knots (26.3 km/h; 16.3 mph) on the surface and 8 knots (15 km/h; 9.2 mph) underwater. On the surface, the Ro-100s had a range of 3,500 nautical miles (6,500 km; 4,000 mi) at 12 knots (22 km/h; 14 mph); submerged, they had a range of 60 nmi (110 km; 69 mi) at 3 knots (5.6 km/h; 3.5 mph).

The boats were armed with four internal bow 53.3 cm (21.0 in) torpedo tubes and carried a total of eight torpedoes. They were also armed with two single mounts for 25 mm (1 in) Type 96 anti-aircraft guns or a single 76.2 mm (3.00 in) L/40 AA gun.

== Construction and commissioning ==
Ro-110 was laid down as Submarine No. 401 on 20 August 1942 by the Kawasaki at Kobe, Japan. She had been renamed Ro-110 by the time she was launched on 26 January 1943. She was completed and commissioned on 6 July 1943.

== Service history ==
=== July–November 1943 ===
Upon commissioning, Ro-110 was attached to the Sasebo Naval District. She was reassigned to Submarine Squadron 11 on 10 July 1943. On 10 November 1943 she was reassigned to Submarine Division 30 in Submarine Squadron 8 in the Southwest Area Fleet, and she departed Sasebo, Japan, that day and moved to Tachibana Bay on the coast of Kyushu. On 12 November 1944 she got underway from Tachibana Bay bound for Penang in Japanese-occupied British Malaya, which she reached on 24 November 1943.

=== First war patrol ===
On 3 December 1943, Ro-110 departed Penang to begin her first war patrol, tasked with raiding Allied shipping in the Indian Ocean. She attacked an Allied convoy in the Bay of Bengal southeast of Madras, India, on 14 December 1943 with a spread of torpedoes, damaging one ship. Another ship rammed her, wrecking one of her periscopes and the roof of her conning tower. The damage forced her to head back to Penang, where she arrived on 19 December 1943 and her commanding officer claimed to have sunk one ship.

At 04:20 on the day Ro-110 attacked the convoy, a submarine torpedoed the British 4,807-gross register ton armed merchant ship Daisy Moller 3 nautical miles (5.6 km; 3.5 mi) off India's coast in the Eastern Ghats region. Daisy Moller, which had left Bombay, India, on 27 November 1943 with a cargo of war materials including ammunition, had made a brief stop at Colombo, Ceylon, before getting back underway on 8 December to complete her voyage by steaming independently to Chittagong, India. After Daisy Moller′s crew abandoned ship in three lifeboats and a number of life rafts and she sank in the Indian Ocean at 16°21′N 082°13′E, the submarine surfaced and rammed the lifeboats, smashing them and spilling their occupants into the sea. The submarine's crew then machine-gunned the survivors in the water before also machine gunning the men aboard the life rafts. Sources disagree on the number of casualties. One source claims that 55 of Daisy Moller′s 71 crew members died in the sinking and subsequent massacre, and that of her 16 survivors, 13 came ashore on the Indian coast in the Krishna River delta at midnight on 17 December 1943 after drifting 80 nautical miles (150 km; 92 mi) to the south-southwest, that fishermen rescued three others from the wreckage of a lifeboat 6 nautical miles (11 km; 6.9 mi) offshore in the same area later on 17 December, and that all 16 survivors were picked up at Masulipatam on 18 December 1943. Other sources claim her crew totaled as many as 127 and that only 14 survived. Ro-110′s log claimed that she never surfaced during her attack on the convoy, and whether she was the submarine which attacked Daisy Moller′s survivors is a matter of controversy.

=== Second war patrol ===
During her stay at Penang, Ro-110 was reassigned to Submarine Division 30 in Submarine Squadron 8 in the 6th Fleet on 1 January 1944. On 2 January 1944, she put to sea to conduct her second war patrol in the Indian Ocean. It was uneventful, and she returned to Penang later in January 1944.

=== Third war patrol ===
Ro-110 again left Penang on 2 February 1944 to begin her third war patrol, assigned a patrol area in the Bay of Bengal. After she departed Penang, the Japanese never heard from her again.

=== Loss ===
On 11 February 1944, Ro-110 attacked Convoy JC-36 — which was bound from Colombo, Ceylon, to Calcutta, India — in the Bay of Bengal 200 nautical miles (370 km; 230 mi) northeast of Madras. She scored two torpedo hits on the British 6,274-gross register ton merchant ship Asphalion. The torpedoes left six members of Asphalion′s crew missing and ten injured and flooded her No. 3 hold and engine room, crippling her. Her surviving crew abandoned ship at 17°28′N 083°32′E, but she remained afloat and later was towed to port.

Meanwhile, the convoy's escorts counterattacked. The Royal Indian Navy sloop HMIS Jumna and the Royal Australian Navy corvettes HMAS Ipswich and HMAS Launceston gained sonar contact on Ro-110 and attacked her with depth charges. Their crews subsequently observed a large amount of oil rising to the surface and heard several large underwater explosions, marking the sinking of Ro-110 at 17°25′N 083°21′E.

On 15 March 1944, the Imperial Japanese Navy declared Ro-110 to be presumed lost with all 47 men on board. The Japanese struck her from the Navy list on 30 April 1944.
