= HMAS Launceston (J179) =

1941 Bathurst-class corvette

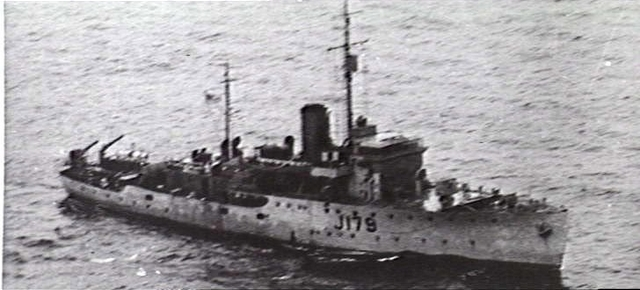

History

Australia
- Namesake: City of Launceston, Tasmania
- Builder: Evans Deakin & Co
- Laid down: 23 December 1940
- Launched: 30 June 1941
- Commissioned: 9 April 1942
- Decommissioned: 23 March 1946
- Honours and awards: Battle honours: Pacific 1942–45; Indian Ocean 1942–44; East Indies 1944; Okinawa 1945
- Fate: Transferred to Turkish Navy
- Badge

Turkey
- Name: Ayancik
- Renamed: Hamit Naci
- Fate: Withdrawn from military service, 1965. Transferred to the Turkish Seamanship College.

General characteristics during RAN service
- Class & type: Bathurst-class corvette
- Displacement: 650 tons (standard), 1,025 tons (full war load)
- Length: 186 ft (57 m)
- Beam: 31 ft (9.4 m)
- Draught: 8.5 ft (2.6 m)
- Propulsion: triple expansion engine, 2 shafts, 2,000 hp (1,500 kW)
- Speed: 15 knots (28 km/h; 17 mph) at 1,750 hp
- Complement: 85
- Armament: 1 × 12-pounder gun; 3 × Oerlikon 20 mm cannons (1 later removed); 1 × Bofors 40 mm L/60 gun (installed later); Machine guns; Depth charges chutes and throwers

HMAS Launceston (J179/B246/A120), named for the city of Launceston, Tasmania, was one of 60 Bathurst-class corvettes constructed during World War II and one of 20 built for the Admiralty but manned by personnel of and commissioned into the Royal Australian Navy (RAN).

== Design and construction ==
In 1938, the Australian Commonwealth Naval Board (ACNB) identified the need for a general purpose 'local defence vessel' capable of both anti-submarine and mine-warfare duties, while easy to construct and operate. The vessel was initially envisaged as having a displacement of approximately 500 tons, a speed of at least 10 knots (19 km/h; 12 mph), and a range of 2,000 nautical miles (3,700 km; 2,300 mi) The opportunity to build a prototype in the place of a cancelled Bar-class boom defence vessel saw the proposed design increased to a 680-ton vessel, with a 15.5 knots (28.7 km/h; 17.8 mph) top speed, and a range of 2,850 nautical miles (5,280 km; 3,280 mi), armed with a 4-inch gun, equipped with asdic, and able to fitted with either depth charges or minesweeping equipment depending on the planned operations: although closer in size to a sloop than a local defence vessel, the resulting increased capabilities were accepted due to advantages over British-designed mine warfare and anti-submarine vessels. Construction of the prototype HMAS Kangaroo did not go ahead, but the plans were retained. The need for locally built 'all-rounder' vessels at the start of World War II saw the "Australian Minesweepers" (designated as such to hide their anti-submarine capability, but popularly referred to as "corvettes") approved in September 1939, with 60 constructed during the course of the war: 36 ordered by the RAN, 20 (including Launceston) ordered by the British Admiralty but manned and commissioned as RAN vessels, and 4 for the Royal Indian Navy.

Launceston was laid down by Evans Deakin & Co at Brisbane, Queensland on 23 December 1940. She was launched on 30 June 1941 by the wife of William Forgan Smith, then Premier of Queensland, and was commissioned into the RAN on 9 April 1942.

== Operational history ==
=== RAN service ===
After entering service, Launceston was initially assigned to convoy escort duties in Australian waters before sailing to Colombo in September 1942 to join the British Eastern Fleet. The corvette as used to escort convoys across the Indian Ocean. On 11 February 1944, Launceston, sister ship HMAS Ipswich and the Indian sloop HMIS Jumna destroyed Japanese submarine Ro-110. Convoy duties continued until September 1944, when the corvette returned to Fremantle for refit. After refit, Launceston operated from Fremantle as an anti-submarine patrol ship until February 1945, when she was sent to Manus Island to join the British Pacific Fleet. As part of the Pacific Fleet, the corvette was involved in the Battle of Okinawa.

Following the end of World War II, Launceston was based in Hong Kong as a minesweeper and anty-piracy patrol ship, before returning to Australia in late 1945. Official visits were made to cities in Tasmania, including the corvette's namesake city, before the corvette sailed to Sydney.

The corvette received four battle honours for her wartime service: "Pacific 1942–45", "Indian Ocean 1942–44", "East Indies 1944", and "Okinawa 1945".

=== Turkish service ===
After the war's end, Launceston was marked for transfer to the Turkish Navy. The corvette was placed in reserve in mid-April 1946, then was recommissioned into the Royal Navy on 21 May as HMS Launceston for the transfer. The corvette, along with sister ships Pirie and Gawler sailed for Colombo, where they were commissioned into the Turkish Navy.

Launceston was initially named TCG Ayancik and she served as a minelayer and minesweeper. She was later withdrawn from military service in 1965. Then, she is transferred to Turkish Seamanship College and renamed as Hamit Naci after the founder of that school.
