= INS Jamuna (U21) =

History

India
- Name: Jumna
- Namesake: Yamuna River
- Ordered: 8 September 1939
- Builder: William Denny and Brothers
- Laid down: 20 February 1940
- Launched: 16 November 1940
- Commissioned: 13 May 1941
- Decommissioned: 31 December 1980
- Fate: Broken up 1981

General characteristics
- Class & type: Black Swan-class sloop
- Displacement: 1,250 tons original; 1,350 tons modified
- Length: 299 ft 6 in (91.29 m)
- Beam: 37 ft 6 in (11.43 m) original; 38 ft 6 in (11.73 m) modified
- Draught: 11 ft (3.4 m)
- Propulsion: Geared turbines, 2 shafts: 3,600 hp (2,700 kW) (original); 4,300 hp (3,200 kW) (3.21 MW) (modified)
- Speed: 19 knots (35 km/h) (original); 20 knots (37 km/h) (modified)
- Range: 7,500 nmi (13,900 km) at 12 kn (22 km/h)
- Complement: 180 (original); 192 (modified)
- Armament: 6 × QF 4 in (102 mm) Mk XVI AA guns (3 × 2); 4 × 2-pounder AA pom-pom; 4 × 0.5-inch (12.7 mm) AA machine guns (original); 12 × 20 mm Oerlikon AA (6 × 2) (modified)

HMIS Jumna (U21) was a Black Swan-class sloop, which served in the Royal Indian Navy (RIN) during World War II.

After India became a republic on 26 January 1950, the vessel was renamed as the Indian Navy's INS Jamuna.

== History ==
HMIS Jumna was ordered in 1939, and built by William Denny and Brothers. She was commissioned in 1941, and with World War II underway, was immediately deployed as a convoy escort. Jumna served as an anti-aircraft escort during the Java Sea campaign in early 1942, and was involved in intensive anti-aircraft action against attacking Japanese twin-engined level bombers and dive bombers, claiming five aircraft downed from 24 to 28 February 1942:
"Chief Ordnance Artificer, Peter Cajetan Mascarenhas was awarded the Distinguished Service Medal for his part in defending the convoy against the Japanese aircraft which attacked it in the Sunda Strait. The citation in the London Gazette said that he had carried out repairs to guns during dive-bombing and machine-gun attacks, and had shown great devotion to duty. Leading Seaman Khan Mohammed, who displayed skill and initiative in engaging the Japanese with an Oerlikon gun was also awarded the Distinguished Service Medal. The Gunnery Officer, Lieut. A.J.V. LeCocq, R.I.N.V.R., was decorated with the Distinguished Service Cross and six of the Jumna's ratings were mentioned in Despatches, having shown "devotion to duty during heavy and continuous dive-bombing attacks".

On 12 February 1944, The Japanese submarine Ro-110 was depth charged and sunk east-south-east off Visakhapatnam, India by the Indian sloop Jumna and the Australian minesweepers HMAS Launceston and HMAS Ipswich. Ro-110 had attacked convoy JC 36 (Colombo-Calcutta) and torpedoed and damaged the British merchant Asphalion (6274 GRT).

In early January 1945, she was deployed with HMIS Narbada to support the landing of the 74th Indian Brigade of the British Indian Army on the Akyab Peninsula, as a part of Operation Lightning. Jumna and Narbada engaged Japanese batteries up the Kaladan River near Ponnagyun. After embarking troops, she joined Task Force 64 headed by HMS Phoebe for support of landing by 3rd British Commando Brigade between Akyab and Ramree with the destroyer HMAS Napier and HMIS Narbada.

Following Indian independence, she was allotted to India, becoming INS Jamuna in 1950 when India became a republic. She was later converted to a survey vessel and was decommissioned on 31 December 1980.
