= SS Empire Cobbett =

World War II merchant ship of the United Kingdom

History
- Name: Empire Cobbett (1942–46); San Wilfrido (1946–59)
- Namesake: William Cobbett; Saint Wilfrid
- Owner: Ministry of War Transport (1942–46); Eagle Oil & Shipping Co. Ltd. (1946–59)
- Operator: Eagle Oil & Shipping Co. Ltd.
- Port of registry: (United Kingdom) Middlesbrough (1942–46); (United Kingdom) London (1946–59)
- Builder: Furness Shipbuilding Co. Ltd.
- Yard number: 350
- Launched: 19 November 1942
- Completed: December 1942
- Identification: Code Letters BFFN; United Kingdom Official Number 164861
- Fate: Scrapped in 1959

General characteristics
- Class & type: Tanker
- Tonnage: 9,811 GRT; 5,779 NRT
- Length: 483 ft 8 in (147.42 m)
- Beam: 68 ft 3 in (20.80 m)
- Depth: 36 ft 1 in (11.00 m)
- Installed power: Triple expansion steam engine
- Propulsion: Screw propeller

SS Empire Cobbett was a 9,811 GRT tanker which was built in 1942 by Furness Shipbuilding Co Ltd, Haverton Hill-on-Tees for the Ministry of War Transport (MoWT). In 1946 she was sold into merchant service and renamed San Wilfrido. She was scrapped in 1959.

== Description ==
The ship was built by Furness Shipbuilding Co Ltd, Haverton Hill-on-Tees, as yard number 350. She was launched on 19 November 1942 and completed in December 1942.

She was 483 feet 8 inches (147.42 m) long, with a beam of 68 feet 3 inches (20.80 m) and a depth of 36 feet 1 inch (11.00 m). She had a GRT of 9,811 and a NRT of 5,779.

The ship was propelled by a triple expansion steam engine, which had cylinders of 27 inches (69 cm), 44 inches (110 cm) and 76 inches (190 cm) diameter by 48 inches (120 cm) stroke. The engine was built by Richardsons, Westgart & Co Ltd, Hartlepool.

== History ==
Empire Cobbett was built for the MoWT, who placed her under the management of Eagle Oil and Shipping Company Ltd, Middlesbrough. Her port of registry was Middlesbrough. The Code Letters BFFN and United Kingdom Official Number 164861 were allocated.

Empire Cobbett was a member of a number of convoys during the Second World War.

HX 249

Convoy HX 249 sailed from New York City on 23 July 1943 and reached Liverpool on 6 August. Empire Cobbett was bound for Avonmouth, Somerset.

HX 255

Convoy HX 255 departed New York on 2 September 1943 and arrived at Liverpool on 16 September. Empire Cobbett was bound for Stanlow Refinery, Ellesmere Port.

HX 313

Convoy HX 313 departed New York on 10 October 1944 and arrived at Liverpool on 24 October 1944. Empire Cobbett was due to have joined this convoy, bound for Milford Haven, Pembrokeshire.

In 1946 Empire Cobbett was sold to Eagle Oil & Shipping Co Ltd, London, who renamed her San Wilfrido and changed her port of registry to London. Her name came from an earlier San Wilfrido, which had been launched for Eagle Oil in 1914 and sunk by a mine that same year.

She served until 1959, arriving on 10 November at Hong Kong for scrapping by Four Seasons Enterprises.
