= Wilfrido Terrazas =

Mexican flutist, composer, improviser, and educator

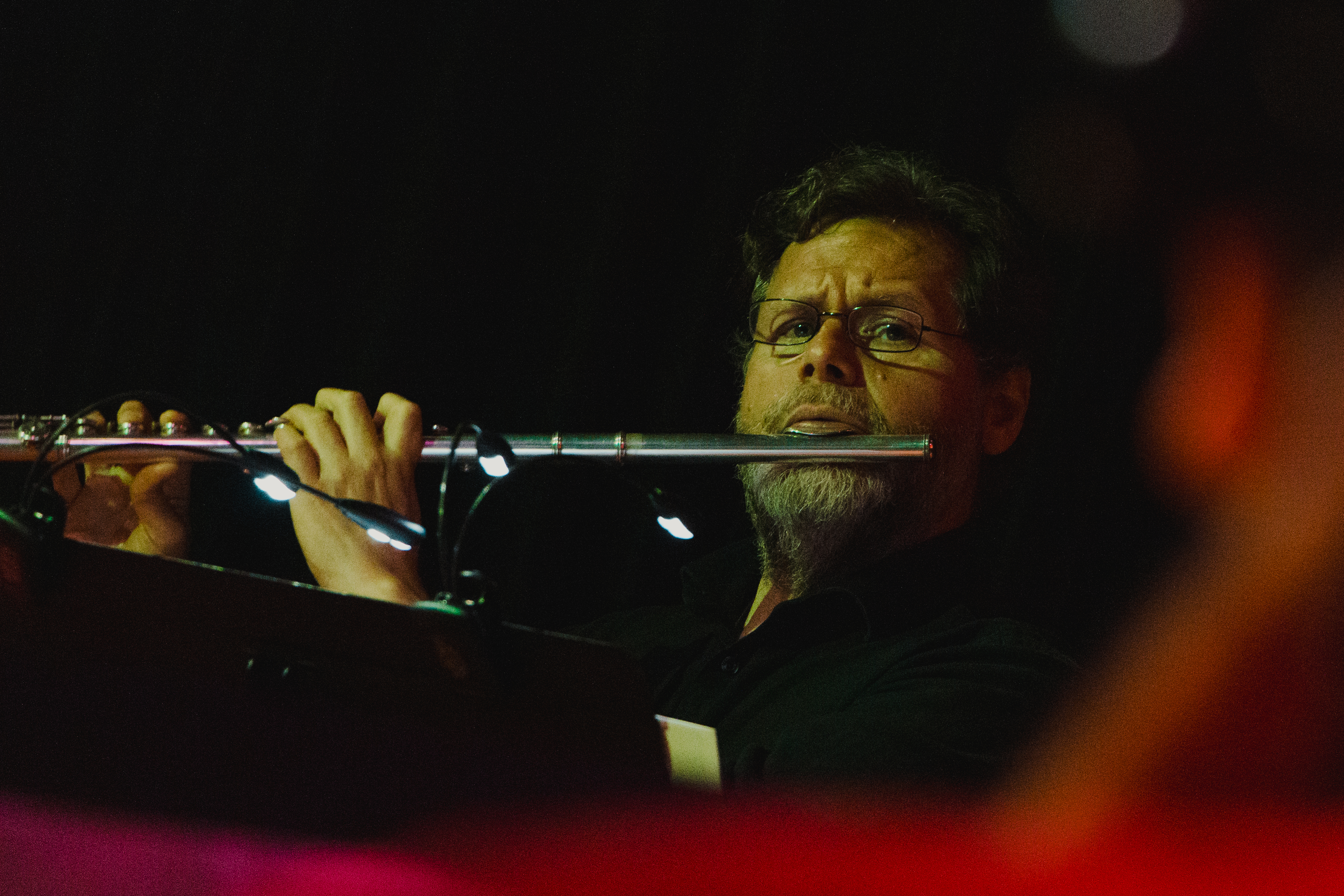

Background information
- Born: 1974 (age 51–52); Camargo, Chihuahua, Mexico
- Origin: Mexico–United States border
- Genres: Contemporary classical; experimental; improvisation
- Occupations: Flutist; composer; improviser; educator
- Instruments: Flute; voice; percussion
- Years active: 1990–present
- Labels: Ápice; Cero Records; New Focus Recordings; Transvection Ltd.

Wilfrido Damián Terrazas Pérez (born 1974) is a Mexican flutist, composer, improviser, and educator. He is connected to the music scene of the Mexico–United States border and has been a professor at the University of California, San Diego (UC San Diego) since 2017.

== Early life and education ==
Wilfrido Damián Terrazas Pérez was born in Camargo, Chihuahua, Mexico, in 1974. He first came into contact with musical instruments during his teenage years; he began playing the flute in 1990, at age 15. He studied at the Center for Musical Studies of the Autonomous University of Baja California (UABC) and later at the Conservatorio de las Rosas from 1996 to 2000, in addition to pursuing further studies in San Diego, California. He later pursued graduate studies at National Autonomous University of Mexico (UNAM) from 2004 to 2006. He graduated with a thesis on Mexican works featuring improvisation in 2021.

== Career ==
Ítaca

The album Ítaca was released by Cero Records, with an official release date of 1 December 2020. In 2021, San Diego Reader reported that the album was recorded at UC San Diego in January 2019 and later mixed and mastered in Mexico City by Ramón del Buey before being published by Cero Records in December 2020.

Sequenza21 described Ítaca as a ten-track album for solo flute, exploring a variety of sonorities and extended techniques, with references to Greek epic.

The Torres Cycle

In 2022, The Torres Cycle was released on New Focus Recordings, described by the label as a seven-part work.

My Shadow Leads the Way

In 2022, My Shadow Leads the Way was released by Transvection Ltd. In a review, Foxy Digitalis noted that the album uses texts by poet Ricardo Cázares and that Terrazas alternates between Spanish and English in the vocals, along with flute and percussive resources.

Wilfrido Terrazas Sea Quintet

Nexos magazine mentioned the Wilfrido Terrazas Sea Quintet and recorded its lineup as Iván Trujillo (trumpet), Edwin Montes (guitar), José Solares (saxophone), and Abraham Lizardo (drums). In 2018, the ensemble released the album Pirate Songs (Ápice, 2018).

== Selected Discography ==
- Pirate Songs — Wilfrido Terrazas Sea Quintet (Ápice, 2018).
- Ítaca (Cero Records, 2020).
- The Torres Cycle (New Focus Recordings, 2022).
- My Shadow Leads the Way (Transvection Ltd., 2022).
- Seven Gifts — with Kyle Motl (2024)
- Trilogía del Dolor (Trilogy of Pain) (2026)

== Reception ==
Sequenza21 reviewed Ítaca, highlighting its exploration of extended techniques and its reference framework in Greek epic. Foxy Digitalis reviewed My Shadow Leads the Way, describing its integration of poetry (Ricardo Cázares), voice, and instrumental elements. KPBS featured one of the pieces from The Torres Cycle and described its overall structure (the “tower” and “totem” works), as well as its production between UC San Diego and Mexico City.
