= Japanese submarine Ro-100 =

Ro-100-class submarine

History

Japan
- Name: Submarine No. 210
- Builder: Kure Naval Arsenal, Kure, Japan
- Laid down: 30 June 1941
- Renamed: Ro-100
- Launched: 6 December 1941
- Completed: 23 September 1942
- Commissioned: 23 September 1942
- Fate: Sunk 25 November 1943
- Stricken: 5 February 1944

General characteristics
- Class & type: Ro-100-class submarine
- Displacement: 611 tonnes (601 long tons) surfaced; 795 tonnes (782 long tons) submerged
- Length: 60.90 m (199 ft 10 in) overall
- Beam: 6.00 m (19 ft 8 in)
- Draft: 3.51 m (11 ft 6 in)
- Installed power: 1,000 bhp (750 kW) (diesel); 760 hp (570 kW) (electric motor)
- Propulsion: Diesel-electric; 1 × diesel engine; 1 × electric motor
- Speed: 14.2 knots (26.3 km/h; 16.3 mph) surfaced; 8 knots (15 km/h; 9.2 mph) submerged
- Range: 3,500 nmi (6,500 km; 4,000 mi) at 12 knots (22 km/h; 14 mph) surfaced; 60 nmi (110 km; 69 mi) at 3 knots (5.6 km/h; 3.5 mph) submerged
- Test depth: 75 m (246 ft)
- Crew: 38
- Armament: 4 × bow 533 mm (21 in) torpedo tubes; 2 × 25 mm (1 in) Type 96 anti-aircraft guns or 1 × 76.2 mm (3.00 in) L/40 AA gun

Ro-100 was an Imperial Japanese Navy Ro-100-class submarine. Completed and commissioned in September 1942, she served in World War II, operating in the Solomon Islands, Rabaul, and New Guinea areas. She sank in November 1943 when she struck a mine during her seventh war patrol.

== Design and description ==
The Ro-100 class was a medium-sized, coastal submarine derived from the preceding Kaichū type. They displaced 611 tonnes (601 long tons) surfaced and 795 tonnes (782 long tons) submerged. The submarines were 60.9 meters (199 ft 10 in) long, had a beam of 6 meters (19 ft 8 in) and a draft of 3.51 meters (11 ft 6 in). They had a double hull and a diving depth of 75 meters (246 ft).

For surface running, the boats were powered by two 500-brake-horsepower (373 kW) diesel engines, each driving one propeller shaft. When submerged each propeller was driven by a 380-horsepower (283 kW) electric motor. They could reach 14.2 knots (26.3 km/h; 16.3 mph) on the surface and 8 knots (15 km/h; 9.2 mph) underwater. On the surface, the Ro-100s had a range of 3,500 nautical miles (6,500 km; 4,000 mi) at 12 knots (22 km/h; 14 mph); submerged, they had a range of 60 nmi (110 km; 69 mi) at 3 knots (5.6 km/h; 3.5 mph).

The boats were armed with four internal bow 53.3 cm (21.0 in) torpedo tubes and carried a total of eight torpedoes. They were also armed with two single mounts for 25 mm (1 in) Type 96 anti-aircraft guns or a single 76.2 mm (3.00 in) L/40 AA gun.

== Construction and commissioning ==
Ro-100 was laid down as Submarine No. 210 on 30 June 1941 by the Kure Naval Arsenal at Kure, Japan. She had been renamed Ro-100 by the time she was launched on 6 December 1941. She was completed and commissioned on 23 September 1942.

== Service history ==
=== September 1942–February 1943 ===
Upon commissioning, Ro-100 was attached to the Yokosuka Naval District and assigned to the Kure Submarine Squadron for workups. She was reassigned to Submarine Squadron 7 in the 8th Fleet on 15 December 1942. On 20 December 1942, she departed Yokosuka bound for Truk, which she reached on 28 December 1942.

Ro-100 departed Truk bound for Rabaul on New Britain on 6 January 1943, but suffered a diesel engine breakdown that forced her to return to Truk on 7 January 1943 for repairs. With her engine repaired, she again set out for Rabaul on 3 February 1943. While she was in the Bismarck Sea northwest of Rabaul on 6 February 1943, an Imperial Japanese Navy Air Service Aichi E13A1 (Allied reporting name "Jake") floatplane mistakenly bombed her, but she suffered only minor damage. She arrived at Rabaul on 7 February 1943.

=== First war patrol ===
On 8 February 1943, Ro-100 departed Rabaul to begin her first war patrol, assigned a patrol area in the Coral Sea south of Port Moresby, New Guinea. She was 40 nautical miles (74 km; 46 mi) south-southwest of Port Moresby on 14 February 1943 when she sighted an Allied convoy after 16:30 and began a submerged approach at 2.5 knots (4.6 km/h; 2.9 mph) to reach an attack position. During the approach, her commanding officer neglected to conduct a periscope sweep to watch for other Allied ships, and he did not notice an approaching Allied destroyer until it was almost on top of Ro-100. Ro-100 crash-dived to 140 feet (43 m), and the destroyer dropped more than a dozen depth charges. The exploding depth charges caused several leaks in Ro-100's main engine room and conning tower, knocked out both of her periscopes, and caused her to take on a steep up-angle. To assist in getting Ro-100 back on an even keel so that her crew could regain control of her before she sank to collapse depth, her commanding officer ordered every available crewman to the forward torpedo room to weigh down her bow. Ro-100 survived, but was forced to abandon her patrol and return to Rabaul for repairs. After she arrived at Rabaul on 20 February 1943, several of her officers were replaced.

=== Operation I-Go ===
After the Combined Fleet initiated Operation I-Go — a reinforcement of the 11th Air Fleet base at Rabaul by planes from the aircraft carriers Zuikaku and Zuihō and of the Japanese naval air base on Balalae Island in the Shortland Islands by planes from the aircraft carriers Hiyō and Jun'yō. — Ro-100 departed Rabaul on 1 April 1943 to support the operation by patrolling southeast of Guadalcanal, but soon after she arrived in her patrol area her gyrocompass broke, forcing her to abort her patrol. She returned to Rabaul on 12 April 1943.

=== Second and third war patrols ===
Ro-100 got underway from Rabaul on 22 April 1943 for her second war patrol, again bound for a patrol area southeast of Guadalcanal. The patrol was uneventful, and she returned to Rabaul on 14 May 1943. She put to sea on 27 May for her third war patrol, again southeast of Guadalcanal, but it also passed quietly, and she returned to Rabaul on 20 June 1943.

=== Fourth war patrol ===
On 30 June 1943, the New Georgia campaign began with the U.S. landings on New Georgia, Rendova, and other islands in the central Solomon Islands. Ro-100 departed Rabaul on 2 July 1943 for her fourth war patrol, assigned a patrol area south of Rendova. While in the Blanche Channel during darkness in early July 1943 conducting a reconnaissance of the American airfield on New Georgia, Ro-100 struck a reef, suffering damage to a fuel tank and two of her bow torpedo tubes. After reporting her damage, she received orders to pick up stranded Imperial Japanese Navy pilots of the 201st and 204th Naval Air Group at Simbo in the western Solomon Islands and then proceed to Rabaul for repairs. After picking up the pilots, she disembarked them at Buin on Bougainville, then arrived at Rabaul on 12 July 1943.

=== August 1943 ===
On 7 August 1943, Ro-100 left Rabaul bound for the waters off New Guinea. Her crew soon noticed a leak from her recently repaired fuel tank, and she turned back. She was on the surface off Buka Island on 8 August 1943 when an unidentified submarine attacked her; she sighted the wakes of four torpedoes, but all of them missed. While she was on the surface off Cape St. George on New Ireland that night, an Allied patrol plane surprised her, dropping flares, missing her with two bombs, and strafing her. She crash-dived, escaped, and arrived at Rabaul on 11 August 1943.

=== Fifth and sixth war patrols ===
Ro-100 got underway from Rabaul in mid-August 1943 for her fifth war patrol. While at sea, she was reassigned to Submarine Division 51 on 20 August 1943, but otherwise the patrol was uneventful, and she returned to Rabaul in early September 1943. She put to sea on 7 September 1943 for her sixth war patrol, assigned a patrol area north of New Guinea. It also passed quietly, and she returned to Rabaul on 18 September 1943. She later proceeded to Truk, where she was drydocked on 30 September 1943.

=== Seventh war patrol ===
On 1 November 1943, the Bougainville campaign began with U.S. landings at Cape Torokina on Bougainville. Tasked to run supplies to Japanese forces fighting on Bougainville and then patrol off Bougainville, Ro-100 departed Truk on 10 November and reached Rabaul on 19 November 1943. After loading a cargo of rubber containers packed with food, she departed Rabaul at 05:00 on 23 November 1943 on an emergency supply run to Buin on Bougainville.

=== Loss ===
On 25 November 1943, Ro-100 was on the surface in Bougainville Strait, making her way to Bougainville via the northern channel to Buin, when she struck a mine at 19:10 local time 2 nautical miles (3.7 km; 2.3 mi) west of Oema Island at 06°50′S 155°58′E. The explosion blew her commanding officer and lookouts overboard, and she began to sink rapidly. Her engineering officer ordered all hands still on board to abandon ship. Sharks attacked her survivors as they tried to swim to Buin, and ultimately only 12 men out of her crew of 50 survived.

The Japanese struck Ro-100 from the Navy list on 5 February 1944.
