= Eagle Oil and Shipping Company =

U.K. shipping company

Eagle Oil and Shipping Company was a United Kingdom merchant shipping company that operated oil tankers between the Gulf of Mexico and the UK. Weetman Pearson, 1st Viscount Cowdray founded it as the Eagle Oil Transport Company in 1912 and sold it to Royal Dutch Shell in 1919. It was renamed Eagle Oil and Shipping Company in about 1930, and remained a separate company within the Royal Dutch Shell group until it was absorbed in 1959.

== Pearson oil interests in Mexico ==
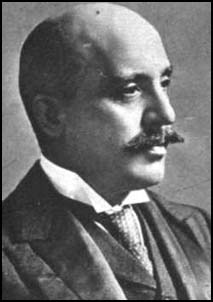
Weetman Pearson, Viscount Cowdray

House flag of Eagle Oil Shipping Co. Ltd.

Sir Weetman Pearson, Bart. (ennobled as Viscount Cowdray in 1910) headed a successful civil engineering contractor, S. Pearson and Sons, that had contracts in Mexico from 1889. He initiated oil prospecting there in 1901 and founded the Mexican Eagle Petroleum Company in 1909, which had its first major oil strike in 1910 (near Tampico on the Gulf of Mexico coast).

Before Pearson struck oil, he started to order oil tankers to carry the oil that he hoped to produce. Armstrong Whitworth on the River Tyne launched San Cristobal (2,041 tons) in 1906 and Swan Hunter, also on Tyneside, launched San Antonio (5,251 tons) in 1909. Pearson also bought James Brand (3,907 tons), which had been built by Armstrong Whitworth in 1893, and renamed her San Bernardo.

== Eagle Oil Transport Company ==
In 1912 Pearson founded the Eagle Oil Transport Company in the UK to take over his ships and carry Mexican Eagle's products. He also founded the Anglo-Mexican Petroleum Company in the UK to sell Mexican Eagle's products outside Mexico.

Eagle Oil Transport immediately ordered 20 modern steam tankers at a cost of £3 million. The company gave all the ships the Spanish names of Christian saints, most of them ending in "o". Swan Hunter launched San Dunstano (6,238 tons) and San Eduardo (6,225 tons) in 1912, San Fraterno (11,929 tons) San Silvestre (6,223 tons), San Tirso (6,236 tons) and San Gregorio (12,093 tons) in 1913 and San Lorenzo (12,097 tons) in 1914. Palmers Shipbuilding and Iron Company, also on the Tyne, launched San Hilario (10,157 tons) and San Valerio (6,493 tons) in 1913 and San Melito (12,286 tons) in 1914. William Doxford & Sons launched San Jeronimo (12,398 tons), San Nazario (12,029 tons) and San Zeferino (6,433 tons) in 1914. Armstrong Whitworth launched San Ricardo (6,465 tons) and San Urbano (6,458 tons) in 1913, San Wilfrido (6,458 tons), San Isidoro (9,718 tons) and San Onofre (9,717 tons) in 1914 and San Patricio (12,092 tons) in 1915.

Eagle Oil Transport suffered significant war losses in the First World War. On 3 August 1914 San Wilfrido struck a mine and sank off Cuxhaven in the North Sea, making her the first merchant ship sunk in the First World War. German submarines torpedoed and sank San Hilario in April 1917 and San Urbano and San Onofre in May 1917, all in the North Atlantic to the west of Ireland. In 1915 the company had bought a dry cargo steamship, Drumlanrig, which was renamed Santa Amalia. In December 1917 the German submarine SM U-19 torpedoed and sank Santa Amalia in the North Atlantic to the west of Islay, with the loss of 43 officers and crew. San Zeferino was damaged by enemy action during the war.

Eagle Oil Transport had at least one motor tanker by the end of the War; San Dario (1,137 tons), which had been launched in 1918 by Short Brothers of Sunderland. The company continued to buy new steam tankers until at least 1928, when J.L. Thompson and Sons launched San Casto (2,446 tons) on the River Wear and Armstrong Whitworth launched San Claudio (2,712 tons).

In 1919 Viscount Cowdray sold his group of oil companies to Royal Dutch Shell. Eagle Oil Transport renewed and expanded its fleet, and some of the new ships were very large by the standards of the day. Armstrong Whitworth launched San Fernando (13,056 tons) in 1919, San Felix (13,037 tons) in 1921 and San Fabian (13,013 tons) in 1922. Swan Hunter launched San Florentino (12,842 tons) in 1919 and Palmers launched San Gaspar (12,910 tons) in 1921 and San Gerardo (12,915 tons) in 1922.

Eagle Oil also bought new medium-sized tankers. Swan Hunter built the War Standard Type Z tanker War Kookri (5,582 tons) for the UK Shipping Controller, but when she was launched in 1919 Cowdray bought her and renamed her San Zotico. Cowdray then turned to the US for new ships of this size. Standard Shipbuilding Company of Shooters Island, New York launched San Teodoro (6,137 tons), San Tiburcio (5,995 tons) and San Ubaldo (5,999 tons) in 1921.

After 1921 Cowdray reverted to UK shipyards. Armstrong Whitworth launched San Roberto (5,890 tons) and San Rosendo (5,891 tons) in 1922, San Quirino (5,843 tons) in 1923 and San Salvador (5,805 tons) in 1924.

In 1927 San Fraterno was wrecked on a rock at Bonet Island in the Strait of Magellan and in 1929 San Dunstano was wrecked at the entrance to Tampico harbour.

In about 1930 the Eagle Oil Transport Company was renamed the Eagle Oil and Shipping Company. In about 1935 the company started adding a new generation of motor tankers including San Adolfo (7,365 tons) launched by the Furness Shipbuilding Company on the River Tees, San Alberto (7,397 tons) launched by Lithgows on the River Clyde, San Alvaro (7,385 tons) launched by Swan Hunter, San Amado (7,316 tons) launched by the Blythswood Shipbuilding Company on the Clyde, San Ambrosio (7,410 tons) launched by Hawthorn Leslie and Company on the Tyne and San Arcadio (7,419 tons) launched by Harland and Wolff in Belfast, Northern Ireland. New additions continued until 1939, when Lithgows launched San Eliseo (8,042 tons), Harland and Wolff launched San Emiliano (8,071 tons) and Furness Shipbuilding launched San Ernesto (8,078 tons).

Eagle Oil and Shipping was registered in the United Kingdom. Therefore, after 1938 although the Mexican government had nationalised Mexican Eagle Petroleum, Eagle Oil and Shipping remained a subsidiary of Royal Dutch Shell. After 1938 the fleet continued to carry oil from the Gulf of Mexico to the UK. During the Second World War the company played an important role in supplying petroleum and petroleum products to the United Kingdom. Oil tankers were a particular target in Germany's economic warfare against the Allies. Enemy action sank 17 Eagle Oil ships, killing at least 206 officers, men and DEMS gunners.

San Calisto (8,018 tons) was launched by Lithgows on the Clyde in 1937. On 2 December 1939 she struck a mine off the Tongue Lightship in the Thames Estuary and sank with the loss of six men. On 4 May 1940 San Tiburcio struck a mine and sank in the North Sea off the Moray Firth.

San Casimiro (8,045 tons) and San Conrado (7,982 tons) were sister ships launched by Blythswood at Scotstoun in 1936. San Casimiro was captured off Cape Race, Newfoundland by the German battleship Gneisenau on 15 March 1941 and scuttled off the Azores five days later. San Conrado was bombed and sunk by enemy aircraft off The Smalls on the coast of west Wales on 1 April 1941.

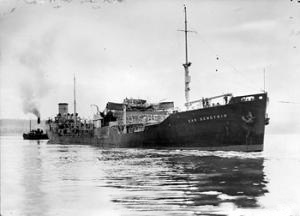
San Demetrio reached the Clyde in 1940 carrying a cargo of aviation spirit, despite having been damaged and set on fire by shelling from the Admiral Scheer

San Demetrio (8,073 tons), which Blythswood had launched at Port Glasgow in 1938, became famous for surviving a naval bombardment by the German heavy cruiser Admiral Scheer in 1940. San Demetrio's crew succeeded in extinguishing the resultant fire and bringing the ship and her cargo of aviation spirit to Glasgow, Scotland. San Demetrio was repaired and returned to service, but the German submarine U-404 torpedoed and sank her in the western Atlantic off Virginia on 17 March 1942 with the loss of 19 lives.

On 2 October 1941 U-98 torpedoed and sank San Florentino north of the Azores with the loss of 22 lives. On 31 January 1942 U-107 torpedoed and sank San Arcadio north of Bermuda with the loss of 41 lives. On 31 March 1942 U-71 torpedoed and sank San Gerardo off the eastern coast of the US with the loss of 51 lives. On 9 April 1942 U-203 torpedoed and sank San Delfino (8,072 tons) in the North Atlantic off Cape Hatteras, USA with the loss of 28 lives. On 17 May 1942 U-155 torpedoed and sank San Demetrio's sister ship San Victorio in the eastern Caribbean southwest of Grenada with the loss of 52 lives. On 27 August 1942 U-511 torpedoed and sank San Fabian between Jamaica and the Dominican Republic in the Caribbean with the loss of 26 lives.

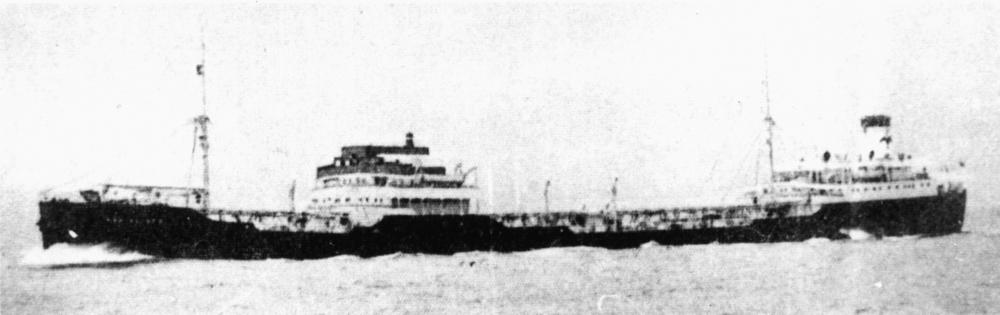
The Japanese submarine I-37 torpedoed San Ernesto in the Indian Ocean in 1943. The crew abandoned ship but the tanker stayed afloat and drifted 2,000 miles to Nias in the Dutch East Indies, where occupying Japanese forces dismantled her.

In 1942 the Ministry of War Transport placed the Empire ships Empire Airman, Empire Cobbett and Empire Norseman under Eagle Oil and Shipping's management. In 1943 two U-boats torpedoed and sank Empire Norseman (9,811 tons) in the Atlantic south of the Azores. After the Second World War the company bought Empire Airman and Empire Cobbett from the ministry, renamed them San Wenceslao and San Wilfrido respectively and kept them in service until 1959.

During the war Eagle Oil and Shipping bought several new tankers to replace war losses. Harland and Wolff launched San Veronico (8,198 tons) and San Vulframo (8,167 tons) in 1942 and San Vito (8,163 tons) in 1943. Hawthorn Leslie launched San Venancio (8,152 tons) in 1942 and San Velino (8,210 tons) in 1944. After the War, Eagle Oil bought two US-built T2 tankers: Bryce Canyon in 1948 and Laurel Hill in 1949. The company renamed them San Leonardo and San Leopoldo respectively and kept them in service until 1961.

Between 1950 and 1960 Eagle Oil acquired at least 16 new tankers. Two of the earliest were a second San Salvador (10,802 tons) and a second San Silvestre (10,953 tons), both launched by Furness Shipbuilding in 1950. Later ships included San Flaviano (12,278 tons) and San Fortunato (12,257 tons), both launched in 1956 by Cammell Laird on the River Mersey.

In April 1958 a Douglas B-26 Invader bomber aircraft, painted black and with no markings, bombed and sank San Flaviano in Balikpapan Harbour, Borneo, killing two of her crew. The aircraft, its bombs and its pilot, William H. Beale, were sent by the CIA as part of US covert support for the Permesta rebellion in North Sulawesi. UK Prime Minister Harold Macmillan and Foreign Secretary Selwyn Lloyd supported the US policy to supply Permesta and on 6 May 1958, more than a week after the CIA sank San Flaviano, Lloyd secretly told US Secretary of State John Foster Dulles that this was still his position. On 18 May, Indonesian forces shot down a different Permesta B-26 and captured its CIA pilot, Allen Pope. Nevertheless, in June 1958 both Indonesia and the UK publicly claimed that the aircraft had been flown by Indonesian rebels, concealing the CIA involvement of which both governments were well aware. The CIA pilots had orders to target commercial shipping in order to frighten foreign merchant ships away from Indonesian waters, thereby weakening the Indonesian economy and destabilising the Indonesian government of President Sukarno. In this they were at least partly successful: Royal Dutch Shell suspended its tanker service to Balikpapan and evacuated shore-based wives and families to Singapore.

Several new ships delivered to Eagle Oil in the later 1950s were in the order of 18,000 to 19,500 tons. One of the last new ships to be delivered for the fleet was also one of the largest; the second San Conrado (34,750 tons), launched by Furness Shipbuilding in 1960. By then Royal Dutch Shell had absorbed Eagle Oil and Shipping, which ceased to be a separate member of the group in 1959.

== Sources ==
- Conboy, Kenneth; Morrison, James (1999). Feet to the Fire CIA Covert Operations in Indonesia, 1957–1958. Annapolis: Naval Institute Press. ISBN 1-55750-193-9.
- Godley, Andrew (2007). Weetman Pearson in Mexico and the emergence of a British oil major 1900–1919. Reading, Berkshire: Henley School of Management.
- Kahin, Audrey R; Kahin, George McT (1997) [1995]. Subversion as Foreign Policy The Secret Eisenhower and Dulles Debacle in Indonesia. Seattle and London: University of Washington Press. ISBN 0-295-97618-7.
- Talbot-Booth, E.C. (1942) [1936]. Ships and the Sea (Seventh ed.). London: Sampson Low, Marston & Co. Ltd.
