= SS San Wilfrido (1914) =

History

United Kingdom
- Name: San Wilfrido
- Namesake: Saint Wilfrid
- Owner: Eagle Oil & Shipping Co Ltd
- Operator: Eagle Oil & Shipping Co Ltd
- Port of registry: London
- Builder: Armstrong, Whitworth, Low Walker
- Yard number: 856
- Launched: 11 February 1914
- Completed: April 1914
- Identification: UK official number 136658; Code letters JFHC
- Fate: Sunk by mine, 3 August 1914

General characteristics
- Type: tanker
- Tonnage: 6,458 GRT, 3,928 NRT, 9,400 DWT
- Length: 420.3 ft (128.1 m)
- Beam: 54.7 ft (16.7 m)
- Depth: 32.6 ft (9.9 m)
- Installed power: 554 nhp
- Propulsion: 1 × screw; 1 × quadruple expansion engine
- Speed: 11 knots (20 km/h)
- Notes: sister ships: San Urbano, San Valerio, San Zeferino

SS San Wilfrido was a 6,458 GRT steam-powered British tanker that was launched in February 1914 and sunk by a German mine less than six months later. Armstrong, Whitworth & Co Ltd built her on the River Tyne for the Eagle Oil Transport Co Ltd.

San Wilfrido struck the mine in the North Sea on 3 August 1914, one day before Britain declared war on Germany. She was Britain's first naval loss of the First World War.

This was the first of two Eagle Oil tankers to be called San Wilfrido. The second was the Empire ship Empire Cobbett, which Eagle Oil bought and renamed San Wilfrido in 1946.

== Building ==
Armstrong, Whitworth & Co Ltd built San Wilfrido at Low Walker as yard number 856. She was launched on 11 February 1914 and completed in April 1914.

San Wilfrido was the third of four sister ships. In 1913 Armstrong Whitworth built San Urbano and Palmers Shipbuilding and Iron Company built San Valerio. In 1914 Palmer's launched San Zeferino the day after Armstrong, Whitworth launched San Wilfrido.

San Wilfrido was 420.3 ft (128.1 m) long, with a beam of 54.7 ft (16.7 m) and a depth of 32.6 ft (9.9 m). Her tonnages were 6,458 GRT, 3,928 NRT and 9,400 DWT. She had a single screw, powered by a quadruple expansion engine built by the Wallsend Slipway & Engineering Company Ltd, Wallsend. It was rated at 554 nhp and gave San Wilfrido a speed of 11 knots (20 km/h).

San Wilfrido's UK official number was 136658 and her code letters were JFHC.

== History ==
San Wilfrido made trips with usually 8,000 tonnes of oil out of her tonnage of 9,000. The ship was sunk just four months after her completion.

=== Sinking ===
On 3 August 1914 San Wilfrido was sailing from Hamburg to Portland in ballast. The trip was expected to take two and a half days, after which she would sail for New Orleans.

While navigating the Elbe about eight miles above Brunsbüttel she was given permission to proceed until Cuxhaven at the mouth of the North Sea. No pilot vessel was available to take her through the minefield at Cuxhaven so she tried to proceed on her own along the usual channel. Tugboat men of the harbour tried to warn San Wilfrido's master of the danger by shouting. The master then tried to evade the mines by attempting to go full speed astern. However, at about 4 p.m., a strong ebb tide carried San Wilfrido into the mines. Three explosions followed and crippled the ship making her the first British naval loss of the war. A German tug took the crew away as internees.

The British Consul-General in Antwerp was informed and he in turn notified the British Admiralty. The information was passed on to Lloyd's of London. When the news of the ship's sinking arrived to Britain four days later, on 7 August, Britain was already at war with Germany.

Most of her 44-strong crew were from Tyneside, with three or four believed to be from London. Her Master was Captain CH Williams of Cardiff. The crew was interned and had to survive on raw herring for two days until they were transferred to Ruhleben internment camp.

San Wilfrido carried a Marconi Company wireless telegraphy installation. Ben Baxter, one of her wireless operators, made a model ship of San Wilfrido while interned, and after the war he submitted it to the Ruhleben Exhibition at Central Hall Westminster. The model is now in the collections of the Imperial War Museum in London.

The wreck was removed from Cuxhaven in September 1920.

== See also ==
- Glitra, the first British merchant ship to be sunk by a submarine after war had been declared.
