= Anglo-Saxon Petroleum =

British oil and gas business

Anglo Saxon Petroleum Company Limited
- House flag
- Type: Subsidiary
- Industry: Shipping
- Founded: 29 June 1907
- Headquarters: Shell Centre, London, England,
- Parent: Shell

Anglo-Saxon Petroleum Company Limited is a dormant company owned by Shell.

== History ==
Around 1898, the company became responsible for the ships of Shell Transport and Trading. In 1907, the Dutch Petroleum Company was established to take over the petroleum business of the Dutch state authorities and Shell. The same year it was incorporated into Royal Dutch Shell.

In 1908, Shell Transport and Trading had placed all of its assets in Anglo-Saxon Petroleum Co. and Bataafsche Petroleum Maatschappij, which also held all of the assets of Royal Dutch Shell. Since then, the company owned and ran the oil transport and storage activities of the Shell group of companies. In order to match transport demand, the company commissioned new vessels based on their own design, as well as bought and re-designed existing ships.

Liner ships, general cargo vessels, sailing ships and train ferries were re-built and made into oil carriers.

In November 1955 Shell took over the assets of Anglo-Saxon, which ceased to function as a separate company.

== Managing Directors appointed 1907-1946 ==
General managing directors of Royal Dutch and chairmen of Shell Transport are marked with an asterisk - see the appropriate list above for their dates in office. In November 1955 The Shell Petroleum Company Ltd. took over the assets of Anglo-Saxon, which ceased to function as a separate company.

- Arnold J. Cohen Stuart 1 July 1907 – 1 January 1915
- • Marcus Samuel (first Viscount Bearsted) 1 July 1907 – 21 June 1921
- Robert Waley Cohen 1 July 1907 – 19 December 1928
- • Henri Wilhelm August Deterding 1 July 1907 – 31 December 1936
- Hendrikus Colijn 1 January 1921 – 31 March 1922
- Sir Andrew Agnew 1 October 1922 – 31 December 1922
- Ir. Jean Baptist August Kessler 1 November 1922 – 30 June 1948
- • Frederick Godber 1 February 1929 – 12 July 1946

(first Lord Godber of Mayfield)

- Jan Carel van Panthaleon Baron van Eck 1 January 1937 – 31 December 1946
- (Sir) George Legh-Jones 1 January 1938 – 30 July 1951
- • Drs. Barthold T. W. van Hasselt 20 July 1944 – 31 December 1951
- Francis Hopwood 19 July 1946 - November 1955

(second Lord Southborough)
