= Mexican Eagle Petroleum Company =

Mexican Oil Company (1909-1959)

Compañía Mexicana de Petróleo El Águila S.A.
- Type: S.A.
- Industry: Petroleum
- Founded: 1909
- Founder: Weetman Pearson
- Defunct: 1959; 67 years ago
- Fate: Merged to Royal Dutch Shell
- Successor: Royal Dutch Shell
- Headquarters: Mexico
- Products: Gasoline, lubricants

Compañía Mexicana de Petróleo El Águila SA, (El Águila for short, called in English the Mexican Eagle Oil Company or Mexican Eagle Petroleum Corporation, was a Mexican oil company in the 20th century. The company, established in 1909, produced and commercialised gasoline and lubricants until it was absorbed by the Royal Dutch Shell in 1959.

== History ==
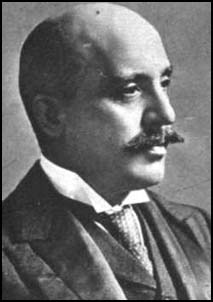
Weetman Pearson, founder

Sir Weetman Pearson, Bart. (Viscount Cowdray from 1910) founded the company in 1909 to develop his investments in the Mexican oil fields.

Pearson's interests in Mexico had begun in 1889 when he won a contract from the government of Porfirio Díaz for his civil engineering company, S. Pearson and Sons Ltd, to build the Gran Canal in Mexico City. This was followed by contracts in 1895 to build a harbour at Veracruz and in 1896 to build the Tehuantepec Railway. Pearson diversified into mining, landholding, transport and electrical utilities around Veracruz. He and the engineer F.S. Pearson (no relation) founded the Mexico Power and Light Company, which provided Mexico City's first public electricity supply. Pearson's businesses and government contracts put him in a favourable position with members of the Díaz dictatorship.

Oil production in Mexico was begun in 1901 by a US oil investor, Henry Clay Pierce. He was quickly followed by a rival, Edward L. Doheny, in the same year. Pearson's land surveys in the vicinities of Pedregal and San Cristóbal for the route of the Tehuantepec Railway had reported oil seepage from the ground, so in April 1901 he ordered his manager in Mexico to secure prospecting options on "...all land for miles around". Pearson built a refinery, pipelines and port facilities to handle the oil in 1905–06, but his company didn't make a major oil strike until 1908. In the same year one of Pearson's oil strikes caught fire and burned out of control for eight weeks, destroying the entire oil field.

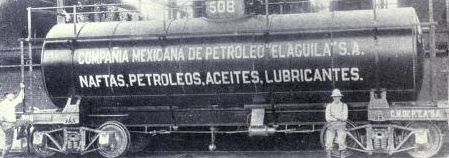
Rail tank car of the company, 1914

In 1909 Pearson founded the Compañía Mexicana de Petróleo El Aguila SA ("Mexican Eagle Oil Company") in Mexico to take over S. Pearson and Sons' oil interests. This followed Pearson's creation of Whitehall Securities Corporation Ltd. in the UK in 1908 to manage all of S. Pearson and Sons' investments outside the oil industry. Pearson's prospecting continued without success until 27 December 1910, when a well on the Gulf of Mexico coast between Veracruz and Tampico struck oil that flowed at a rate of 100,000 barrels per day. This single well turned the fortunes of Pearson's oil business. Within a few years he was one of Mexico's two major oil magnates, the other being Doheny. Other oil companies from the USA and Europe had entered the Mexican oil industry but Doheny and Pearson's companies remained pre-eminent until after the First World War.

In 1911 the Mexican Revolution overthrew the Díaz dictatorship that had favoured Pearson, ending the civil engineering contracts for which he had first become involved in Mexico. However, Pearson had exclusive rights to prospect for oil in several Mexican states and by 1914 the company 1,500,000 acres (6,100 km^{2}) of prospecting rights, 175 miles (282 kilometres) of pipeline, two refineries (the second being newly built at Tampico) and storage for seven million barrels of oil.

By June 1913 Mexican Eagle was the largest company in the Pearson group, with net assets valued at £6.8 million. However, in December 1918 Pearson claimed in a letter to the UK Chancellor of the Exchequer, David Lloyd George, that Mexican Eagle was worth £8 million. Mexican Eagle was the largest contributor to the Pearson group's valuation in 1913 of £17 million, which made it the seventh largest business in the UK and among the 30 largest businesses in the World. By 1919 the Pearson group was worth £29.6 million, of which in June of that year Mexican Eagle made up £13.4 million. To what extent this represents a growth in value must be considered against the degree of inflation that took place in the First World War. However, in 1919 the Pearson group's share value was £79.1 million, of which Mexican Eagle made up £62.6 million. This made Mexican Eagle roughly the equal of Burmah Oil and far bigger than the Anglo-Persian Oil Company or Shell Transport and Trading.

== Buyout offers and eventual sale ==
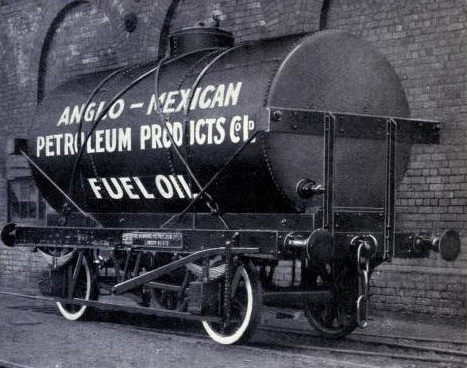
Fuel oil railway tank car. Fifteen tons capacity. Anglo-Mexican Petroleum Company. London, 1914

In 1911 Pearson declined an offer from the Texas Oil Company offered to buy his oil interests. In 1912 and 1913 he declined buyout bids from Royal Dutch Shell. and in 1913 and 1916 he declined bids from Standard Oil of New Jersey. By 1916 Pearson was keen to sell, but the UK Government persuaded him for strategic reasons not to do so. Pearson asked the UK Government to buy 50% of his oil interests, but it responded in 1917 by imposing restrictions that prevented him from transferring ownership as long as the war continued. The Constitution of Mexico adopted in 1917 nationalised oil deposits.

In October 1918, a month before the Armistice, Calouste Gulbenkian started negotiations with Pearson for Royal Dutch Shell to buy Mexican Eagle. On April 2, 1919 the Royal Dutch Petroleum Company and the "Shell" Transport and Trading Company jointly bought Mexican Eagle for US$75 million.

Mexican Eagle was the dominant firm in the Mexican petroleum industry until March 18, 1938, when the government of Lázaro Cárdenas nationalized it, along with all other foreign-owned oil interests, to create Petróleos Mexicanos (Pemex).

El Aguila formally dissolved itself on May 24, 1963.

== Eagle Oil and Shipping Company ==
Pearson started to acquire steam tankers to carry the oil that he hoped to produce. Armstrong Whitworth on the River Tyne launched SS San Cristobal (2,041 tons) in 1906 and Swan Hunter, also on Tyneside, launched SS San Antonio (5,251 tons) in 1909. Pearson also bought SS James Brand (3,907 tons), which had been built by Armstrong Whitworth in 1893, and renamed her San Bernardo.

In 1912 Pearson founded the Eagle Oil Transport Company in the UK to take over his ships and carry Mexican Eagle's products and the "Anglo-Mexican Petroleum Company" in the UK to sell Mexican Eagle's products outside Mexico.

Eagle Oil Transport immediately ordered 20 modern steam tankers at a cost of £3 million. Eagle Oil Transport lost a number of ships to enemy action in the First World War. After the First World War, Eagle Oil Transport renewed and expanded its fleet. It bought numerous new tankers, including six of about 13,000 tons each. When Royal Dutch Shell bought Pearson's oil interests, that included Eagle Oil Transport and Anglo-Saxon Petroleum as well as Mexical Eagle Petroleum.

In about 1930 the Eagle Oil Transport Company was renamed the Eagle Oil and Shipping Company. In about 1935 the company started adding a new generation of motor tankers of about 8,000 tons each.

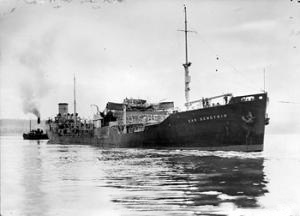
MV San Demetrio reached the Clyde in 1940 with a cargo of aviation spirit despite having been damaged by shellfire from the Admiral Scheer

Eagle Oil and Shipping was registered in the United Kingdom. Therefore, after 1938 although the Mexican government had nationalised Mexican Eagle Petroleum, Eagle Oil and Shipping remained a subsidiary of Royal Dutch Shell. After 1938 the fleet continued to carry oil from the Gulf of Mexico to the UK. During the Second World War the company played an important role in supplying petroleum and petroleum products to the United Kingdom. Oil tankers were a particular target in Germany's economic warfare against the UK. Enemy action sank 17 Eagle Oil's ships and killed at least 206 officers, men and DEMS gunners serving aboard them.

Among the ships lost was MV San Demetrio (8,073 tons), which was famous for surviving a naval bombardment by the German heavy cruiser Admiral Scheer in 1940 that set the tanker on fire. San Demetrio was repaired and returned to service, but the U-boat U-404 torpedoed and sank her in the western Atlantic off Virginia in 1942 with the loss of 19 lives.

In 1942 the Ministry of War Transport placed a number of Empire ships under Eagle Oil and Shipping's management. One was sunk by enemy action in 1943 but after the war the company bought two of the surviving ships from the ministry. The company also bought two T2 tankers that had been built in the USA. The company further renewed its fleet with 16 new ships between 1950 and 1960, and maximum tonnages steadily rose towards the end of the decade. The Royal Dutch Shell parent group absorbed Eagle Oil and Shipping in 1959.

== Sources ==
- Bud Frierman, Lisa; Godley, Andrew C.; Wale, Judith (2007). Weetman Pearson in Mexico and the emergence of a British oil major 1900–1919 (PDF). Reading, UK: Centre for International Business History, University of Reading Business School. Archived from the original (PDF) on December 24, 2016.
- Talbot-Booth, E.C. (1942) [1936]. Ships and the Sea (Seventh ed.). London: Sampson Low, Marston & Co. Ltd.
