= HMS Serapis =

Five ships of the Royal Navy have been named HMS Serapis, after the god Serapis of Hellenistic Egypt.

- HMS Serapis (1779) was a 44-gun Roebuck-class two-decker fifth rate launched in 1779 and captured later that year by the American John Paul Jones. She became a French privateer and was lost to a fire in 1781.
- HMS Serapis (1782) was a 44-gun fifth rate, launched in 1782, converted to a storeship in 1795, and sold at Jamaica in 1826.
- HMS Serapis (1866) was an iron screw Euphrates-class troopship in service from 1866 to 1894.
- HMS Serapis (1918) was a World War I S-class destroyer launched in 1918 and sold 1934.
- HMS Serapis (G94) was a World War II S-class destroyer launched in March 1943, transferred to the Royal Netherlands Navy in October 1945 as HNLMS Piet Hein, and broken up in 1962.
