= HMS Termagant (R89) =

T-class destroyer converted to Type 16 frigate of the Royal Navy

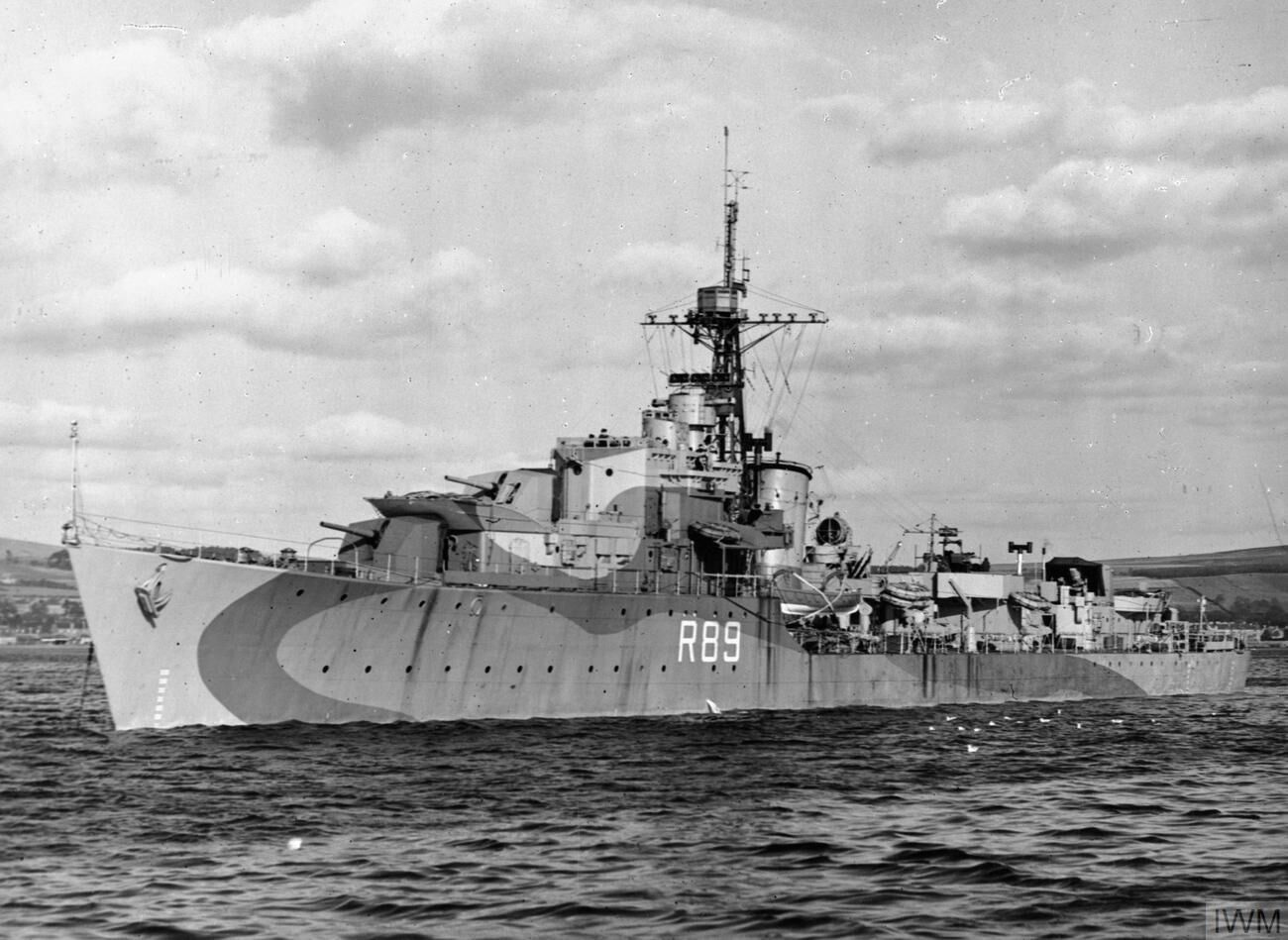
- HMS Termagant at anchor, c. 1943 (IWM)

History

United Kingdom
- Name: HMS Termagant
- Ordered: 14 March 1941
- Builder: William Denny and Brothers, Dumbarton
- Laid down: 25 November 1941
- Launched: 22 March 1943
- Commissioned: 8 October 1943
- Identification: Pennant number: R89 (later F189)
- Motto: 'Untameable'
- Honours and awards: Arctic 1943; Mediterranean 1943-44; Adriatic 1944; South France 1944; Aegean 1944; Okinawa 1945
- Fate: Arrived for scrapping on 5 November 1965
- Badge: On a field White, a shrew mouse proper.

General characteristics as T–class
- Class & type: T-class destroyer
- Displacement: 1,710 long tons (1,737 t) – 1,730 long tons (1,758 t) (standard nominal); 1,780 long tons (1,809 t) – 1,810 long tons (1,839 t) (actual); 2,505 long tons (2,545 t) – 2,545 long tons (2,586 t) (deep load)
- Length: 339 ft 6 in (103.48 m) pp; 362 ft 9 in (110.57 m) oa
- Beam: 35 ft 8 in (10.87 m)
- Draught: 14 ft 2 in (4.32 m)
- Propulsion: 2 shaft Parsons geared turbines; 2 Admiralty 3-drum boilers; 40,000 shp (30,000 kW)
- Speed: 36.75 knots (42.29 mph; 68.06 km/h)
- Complement: 180-225
- Armament: 4 × 4.7-inch (120-mm) QF Mk IX guns (4×1); 2 × 40mm Bofors (1x2); 8 × 20 mm guns anti-aircraft guns; 8 × 21-inch (533 mm) torpedo tubes (2×4)

General characteristics as Type 16
- Class & type: Type 16 frigate
- Displacement: 1,800 long tons (1,800 t) standard; 2,300 long tons (2,300 t) full load
- Length: 362 ft 9 in (110.57 m) o/a
- Beam: 37 ft 9 in (11.51 m)
- Draught: 14 ft 6 in (4.42 m)
- Propulsion: 2 × Admiralty 3-drum boilers; Steam turbines, 40,000 shp; 2 shafts
- Speed: 32 knots (37 mph; 59 km/h) full load
- Complement: 175
- Sensors & processing systems: Type 293Q target indication Radar; Type 974 navigation Radar; Type 1010 Cossor Mark 10 IFF; Type 146B search Sonar; Type 147 depth finder Sonar; Type 162 target classification Sonar; Type 174 attack Sonar
- Armament: 1 × twin 4 in gun Mark 19; 1 × twin 40 mm Bofors gun Mk.5; 5 × single 40 mm Bofors gun Mk.9; 2 × Squid A/S mortar; 1 × quad 21 in (533 mm) tubes for Mk.9 torpedoes

HMS Termagant was a T-class destroyer of the Royal Navy that saw service during the Second World War. She was built by William Denny and Brothers, of Dumbarton and launched on 22 March 1943. She was scrapped in 1965.

== Design and construction ==
The British Admiralty ordered the eight destroyers of the T-class on 14 March 1941 as the 6th Emergency Flotilla. The T-class were War Emergency Programme destroyers, intended for general duties, including use as anti-submarine escort, and were to be suitable for mass-production. They were based on the hull and machinery of the pre-war J-class destroyers, but with a lighter armament (effectively whatever armament was available) in order to speed production. The T-class closely resembled the preceding S-class, but unlike the S-class, were not fitted for operations in the Arctic.

The T-class were 362 feet 9 inches (110.57 m) long overall, 348 feet 0 inches (106.07 m) at the waterline and 339 feet 6 inches (103.48 m) between perpendiculars, with a beam of 35 feet 8 inches (10.87 m) and a draught of 10 feet 0 inches (3.05 m) mean and 14 feet 3 inches (4.34 m) full load. Displacement was 1,802 long tons (1,831 t) standard and 2,530 long tons (2,570 t) full load. Two Admiralty 3-drum water-tube boilers supplied steam at 300 pounds per square inch (2,100 kPa) and 630 °F (332 °C) to two sets of Parsons single-reduction geared steam turbines, which drove two propeller shafts. The machinery was rated at 40,000 shaft horsepower (30,000 kW) giving a maximum speed of 36 knots (41 mph; 67 km/h) and 32 knots (37 mph; 59 km/h) at full load. 615 tons of oil were carried, giving a range of 4,675 nautical miles (5,380 mi; 8,658 km) at 20 knots (23 mph; 37 km/h).

The ship had a main gun armament of four 4.7 inch (120 mm) QF Mk. IX guns, capable of elevating to an angle of 55 degrees, giving a degree of anti-aircraft capability. The close-in anti-aircraft armament, varied between ships of the class, but Termagant was fitted with one Hazemayer stabilised twin mount for the Bofors 40 mm gun and eight Oerlikon 20 mm cannons (4 twin mounts). Two quadruple mounts for 21 inch (533 mm) torpedoes were fitted, while the ship had a depth charge outfit of four depth charge mortars and two racks, with a total of 70 charges carried. She was fitted with an extra 40-mm Bofors gun while operating in the Mediterranean in 1944, and later with another Bofors gun when deployed to the Pacific.

Termagant was fitted with a Type 272 surface warning radar and a high-frequency direction finding (HF/DF) aerial on the ship's lattice foremast, together with a Type 291 air warning radar on a pole mast aft. A Type 285 fire control radar integrated with the ship's high-angle gun director. She had a crew of 179 officers and other ranks.

Termagant was laid down at Denny's Dumbarton shipyard on 25 November 1941 and was launched on 22 March 1943. She was completed on 18 October 1943, and assigned the Pennant number R89.

=== Type 16 conversion ===
After the end of the Second World War and as the Cold War started, the Royal Navy found itself with a shortage of fast anti-submarine escorts capable of dealing with modern Soviet diesel-electric submarines, with existing sloops and frigates too slow. At the same time, the relatively recent War Emergency destroyers, with their low-angle guns and basic fire control systems, were considered unsuitable for modern warfare, so it was decided to convert these obsolete destroyers into fast escorts, acting as a stop-gap solution until new-build ships, such as the Type 12 frigates could be built in sufficient numbers. The Type 16 frigate was a simple "second-rate" conversion, less capable than the "first-rate" Type 15, but cheaper and quicker to convert.

The Type 16 conversion involved removing most of the ship's armament and sensors, while retaining the ship's superstructure. Gun armament consisted of a twin 4-inch (102 mm) mount forward of the bridge, with a close-in anti-aircraft armament of seven 40-mm Bofors guns (1 twin and 5 single mounts). Two Squid anti-submarine mortars provided the ship's primary anti-submarine armament, while one quadruple torpedo-tube mount was retained to give a limited anti-surface capability (or to launch homing anti-submarine torpedoes if available). Type 293Q surface/air-search radar was fitted on the mainmast, with Type 274 navigation radar fitted below. Sonar consisted of Type 146B search sonar, Type 147P depth-finding sonar, together with Type 162 sonar for detecting targets on the sea bottom and Type 174 for control of the Squid mortars.

Termagant was converted by Grayson Rollo at Birkenhead from August 1951 to April 1953.

== Service ==
=== Second World War ===
After working up at Scapa Flow, Termagant formed part of the local escort for the Arctic convoy JW54A for the initial leg of the convoy from 15 to 18 November 1943, when it was relieved by the convoy's Ocean escort. She was then sent to join the Mediterranean Fleet, arriving at Alexandria on 14 January 1944 to join the 24th Destroyer Flotilla, having escorted the battleships Queen Elizabeth, Valiant and the battlecruiser Renown on her passage to the Mediterranean, as the capital ships made their way to the Eastern Fleet.

On the night of 12/13 February 1944, Termagant and sister ship Troubridge shelled Vela Luka in Croatia and on 6/7 April bombarded Bar, Montenegro. On 19 May, the German submarine U-453 attacked a convoy off the heel of Italy, sinking the merchant ship Fort Missanabie. Termagant and the destroyers Tenacious and Liddesdale were ordered to hunt the U-boat, making contact on 20 May and carrying out a series of depth charge attacks until U-453 was forced to the surface early in the morning on 21 May, and was sunk by gunfire from the three destroyers. On 15 August 1944, Termagant took part in Operation Dragoon, the Allied invasion of Southern France, providing fire support for the landings. She remained on duty off the South of France until 28 August.

In September 1944, Germany started to evacuate its troops from islands in the Aegean and from southern Greece, and in response, the British launched an offensive to disrupt the evacuation, with the Royal Navy deploying a task force consisting of seven escort carriers, supported by cruisers and destroyers, with the force including Termagant. On 7 October 1944 she and Tuscan intercepted a German convoy in the Gulf of Salonica, with the two destroyers sinking the German torpedo boat TA37, the subchaser UJ210 and the harbour patrol boat GK32. On 19 October Termagant and Tuscan intercepted and sank the German torpedo boat TA18 (formerly the Italian Solferino) off Volos.

On 1 November 1944, with major operations in the Aegean ended, Termagant set out for Britain, arriving at Portsmouth on 11 November, and was refitted in preparation for operations in the Pacific. The refit was completed at the end of January 1945, and after working up in Malta, sailed via Trincomalee in Ceylon to join the British Pacific Fleet at its base in Australia, receiving the new pennant number D47 for operations in the Pacific. In May 1945, Termagant operated in support of the British Pacific Fleets carriers during operations in support of the Okinawa campaign. On 14–15 June, Termagant formed part of the escort for the aircraft carrier Implacable for Operation Inmate, an attack on the Japanese base at Truk Atoll intended to provide combat experience for Implacable's crew ahead of operations off Japan. Termagant again supported the British carrier fleet during operations against Japan in July 1945, and remained on station into August that year, and was present at the signing of the Surrender of Japan in Tokyo Bay on 2 September.

=== Postwar ===
Between 1946 and 1951 Termagant was held in reserve at Portsmouth. In August 1951, she was towed to Grayson & Rollo's Birkenhead yard from conversion to a Type 16 fast anti-submarine frigate. On 4 March 1953, an oil fire broke out in the ship's engine room, causing paintwork damage, and on 12 March a pipe failure caused the ship's engine room to be flooded to a depth of 5 ft (1.5 m), it taking over three hours for the ship's crew and firefighters to empty the flooded compartment. Despite these incidents, Termagant recommissioned on 28 April 1953 with the new pennant number F189. After commissioning she joined the 3rd Submarine Flotilla at Rothesay as a target ship. In the same year she took part in the Fleet Review to celebrate the Coronation of Queen Elizabeth II.

On 26 September 1957 Termagant returned to the reserve at Devonport, being replaced by the Type 14 frigate Blackwood in the 3rd Submarine Flotilla. She re-commissioning briefly in 1958 for trials.

== Decommissioning and disposal ==
After decommissioning for the last time Termagant was held in reserve at Lisahally between 1961 and 1965. She was then sold for scrapping in 1965 to Arnott Young, Dalmuir, arriving there on 5 November 1965.

== Publications ==
- Blair, Clay (2000). Hitler's U-Boat War: The Hunted, 1942–1945. New York: Modern Library. ISBN 0-679-64033-9.
- Colledge, J. J.; Warlow, Ben (2006) [1969]. Ships of the Royal Navy: The Complete Record of All Fighting Ships of the Royal Navy from the 15th Century to the Present (3rd Rev ed.). London: Chatham Publishing. ISBN 978-1-86176-281-8. OCLC 67375475.
- Critchley, Mike (1982). British Warships Since 1945: Part 3: Destroyers. Liskeard, UK: Maritime Books. ISBN 0-9506323-9-2.
- English, John (2008). Obdurate to Daring: British Fleet Destroyers 1941–45. Windsor, UK: World Ship Society. ISBN 978-0-9560769-0-8.
- Friedman, Norman (2008). British Destroyers & Frigates: The Second World War and After. Barnsley, UK: Seaforth Publishing. ISBN 978-1-84832-015-4.
- Gardiner, Robert; Chesneau, Roger, eds. (1980). Conway's All The World's Fighting Ships 1922–1946. London: Conway Maritime Press. ISBN 0-85177-146-7.
- Gardiner, Robert; Chumbley, Stephen, eds. (1995). Conway's All The World's Fighting Ships 1947–1995. Annapolis, Maryland, USA: Naval Institute Press. ISBN 1-55750-132-7.
- Hobbs, David (2017). The British Pacific Fleet: The Royal Navy's Most Powerful Strike Force. Barnsley, UK: Seaforth Publishing. ISBN 978-1-5267-0283-8.
- Kemp, Paul (1997). U-Boats Destroyed: German Submarine Losses in the World Wars. London: Arms & Armour Press. ISBN 1-85409-321-5.
- Lenton, H. T. (1970). Navies of the Second World War: British Fleet & Escort Destroyers Volume Two. London: Macdonald & Co. ISBN 0-356-03122-5.
- Marriott, Leo (1983). Royal Navy Frigates 1945–1983. Shepperton, UK: Ian Allan. ISBN 0-7110-1322-5.
- O'Hara, Vincent P. (2011). The German Fleet at War, 1939–1945 (eBook ed.). Annapolis, Maryland, USA: Naval Institute Press. ISBN 978-1-61251-397-3.
- Raven, Alan; Roberts, John (1978). War Built Destroyers O to Z Classes. London: Bivouac Books. ISBN 0-85680-010-4.
- Rohwer, Jürgen; Hümmelchen, Gerhard (1992). Chronology of the War at Sea 1939–1945. London: Greenhill Books. ISBN 1-85367-117-7.
- Roskill, Stephen (1961). The War at Sea 1939–1945: Volume III: The Offensive Part II, 1st June 1944 – 14th August 1945. London: Her Majesty's Stationery Office.
- Ruegg, Bob; Hague, Arnold (1993). Convoys to Russia 1941–1945. Kendal, UK: World Ship Society. ISBN 0-905617-66-5.
- Whitley, M. J. (1988). Destroyers of World War 2. Annapolis, Maryland: Naval Institute Press. ISBN 0-87021-326-1.
- Whitley, M. J. (2000). Destroyers of World War 2: An International Encyclopedia. London: Cassell & Co. ISBN 1-85409-521-8.
- Winser, John de S. (2002). British Invasion Fleets: The Mediterranean and beyond 1942–1945. Gravesend, UK: World Ship Society. ISBN 0-9543310-0-1.
