= HMS Tyrian =

Five ships of the Royal Navy have borne the name HMS Tyrian:

- HMS Tyrian (1808) was a 10-gun Cherokee-class brig-sloop launched in 1808 and sold in 1819.
- HMS Tyrian (1826) was a 10-gun Cherokee-class brig-sloop launched in 1826 that became a Post Office Packet Service packet, sailing out of Falmouth, Cornwall. She was used as a quarantine hulk from 1847, a coastguard depot ship from 1866, and was sold in 1892.
- HMS Tyrian (1861) was a Britomart-class wooden screw gunboat launched in 1861, used as a tug from 1883 and was sold in 1891.
- HMS Tyrian (1919) was an S-class destroyer launched in 1919 and scrapped in 1930.
- HMS Tyrian (R67) was a T-class destroyer launched in 1942. She was converted to a Type 16 frigate between 1951 and 1952, and was scrapped in 1965.
