= Task Force 88 (United States Navy) =

Escort carrier force

Task Force 88 (TF88) was the escort carrier force, commanded by Rear Admiral Thomas Hope Troubridge of the Royal Navy, that supported Operation Dragoon, the Allied invasion of southern France. It was activated in August 1944, and dispersed on 29 August when the carrier force departed to operate in the Aegean.

TF88 was a mixed task force of Royal Navy and United States Navy ships that was stationed off Provence. Its tasks were to achieve air superiority over the landing beaches, provide air support for the ground forces by suppressing enemy resistance and movement, destroying military infrastructure and artillery spotting for the naval bombardment.

The TF 88 designation was later used for Operation Argus, an ocean-based US nuclear test series in the late 1950s.

== Task Force 88 order of battle ==
Task Force 88 was made up of two naval groups, 88.1 and 88.2 with VOC-01, an observation composite squadron with 12 Grumman F6F Hellcat nightfighters operating out of Corsica.

Task Group 88.1	Task Group 88.2
HMS Pursuer, 881 Naval Air Squadron (Grumman F4F Wildcat)	USS Tulagi, VOF-01 (Grumman Hellcat)
HMS Searcher, 882 Naval Air Squadron (Grumman Wildcat Mark V)	USS Kasaan Bay VF-74 (F6F Hellcat)
HMS Attacker, 879 Naval Air Squadron Supermarine Seafire	HMS Hunter, 807 Naval Air Squadron Seafire
HMS Emperor, 800 Naval Air Squadron F6F Hellcat	HMS Stalker, 809 Naval Air Squadron Seafire
HMS Khedive, 899 Naval Air Squadron Seafire	HMS Colombo (anti-aircraft cruiser)
HMS Delhi (anti-aircraft cruiser)	HMS Caledon (anti-aircraft cruiser)
HMS Royalist (flagship and Fighter Direction operations)	6 US destroyers
British destroyers (Tuscan, Tenacious, Tumult, Tyrian, Teazer, Wheatland)	
Greek destroyer Navarinon	
