= HMS Troubridge =

T-class destroyer converted to Type 15 frigate of the Royal Navy

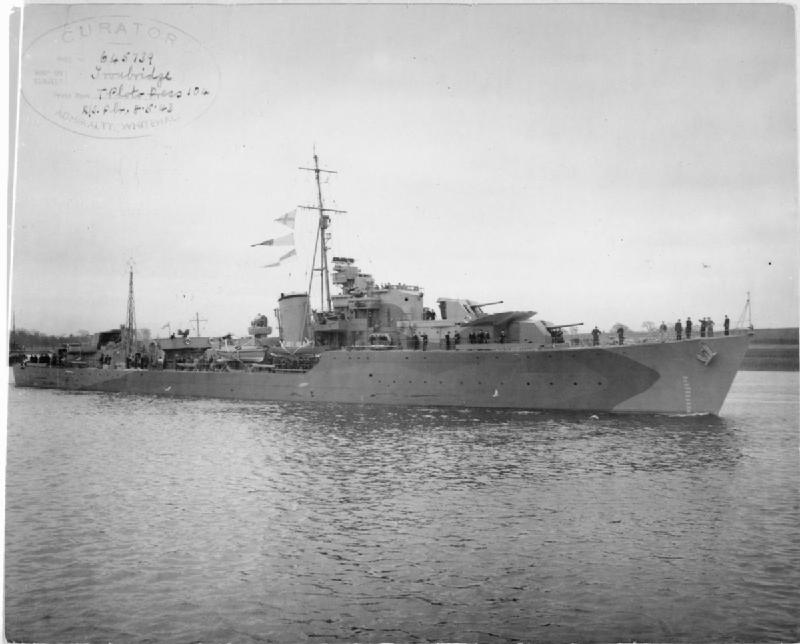
- HMS Troubridge as built

History

United Kingdom
- Name: HMS Troubridge
- Ordered: 13 March 1941
- Builder: John Brown
- Laid down: 10 November 1941
- Launched: 23 September 1942
- Commissioned: 8 March 1943
- Identification: Pennant number R00
- Converted: Type 15 frigate 1955 – 1957
- Decommissioned: 27 March 1969
- Identification: Pennant number F09
- Fate: Broken up May 1970

General characteristics
- Class & type: T-class destroyer
- Displacement: 1,710 long tons (1,737 t) – 1,730 long tons (1,758 t) (standard nominal); 1,780 long tons (1,809 t) – 1,810 long tons (1,839 t) (actual); 2,505 long tons (2,545 t) – 2,545 long tons (2,586 t) (deep load)
- Length: 339 ft 6 in (103.48 m) pp; 362 ft 9 in (110.57 m) oa
- Beam: 35 ft 8 in (10.87 m)
- Draught: 14 ft 2 in (4.32 m)
- Propulsion: 2 shaft Parsons geared turbines; 2 Admiralty 3-drum boilers; 40,000 shp (30,000 kW)
- Speed: 36.75 knots (42.29 mph; 68.06 km/h)
- Complement: 180-225
- Armament: 4 × 4.7-inch (120-mm) QF Mk IX guns (4×1); 2 × 40mm Bofors (1x2); 8 × 20 mm guns anti-aircraft guns; 8 × 21-inch (533 mm) torpedo tubes (2×4)

General characteristics
- Class & type: Type 15 frigate
- Displacement: 2,300 long tons (2,337 t) standard; 2,700 long tons (2,743 t) full load
- Length: 358 ft (109 m) o/a
- Beam: 37 ft 9 in (11.51 m)
- Draught: 14 ft 6 in (4.42 m)
- Propulsion: 2 × Admiralty 3-drum boilers; Steam turbines on 2 shafts; 40,000 shp (30 MW)
- Speed: 31 knots (57 km/h; 36 mph) (full load)
- Complement: 174
- Sensors & processing systems: Radar: Type 293Q target indication .; Type 277Q surface search; Type 974 navigation; Type 262 fire control on director CRBF; Type 1010 Cossor Mark 10 IFF; Sonar: Type 174 search; Type 162 target classification; Type 170 attack
- Armament: 1 × twin 4 in (100 mm) Mark 19 gun; 1 × twin 40mm Bofors Mk.5; 2 × Squid or Limbo Mark 10 anti-submarine mortars

HMS Troubridge was a T-class destroyer of the British Royal Navy that saw service during the Second World War. Post war she was converted into a Type 15 frigate.

== Design ==
Troubridge was one of eight T-class destroyers ordered as the 6th Emergency Flotilla on 14 March 1941. The T-class were War Emergency Programme destroyers, intended for general duties, including use as anti-submarine escort, and were to be suitable for mass-production. They were based on the hull and machinery of the pre-war J-class destroyers, but with a lighter armament (effectively whatever armament was available) in order to speed production. The T-class were almost identical to the S-class ordered as the 5th Emergency Flotilla earlier in the year, but were not fitted for operations in Arctic waters.

The T-class were 362 feet 9 inches (110.57 m) long overall, 348 feet 0 inches (106.07 m) at the waterline and 339 feet 6 inches (103.48 m) between perpendiculars, with a beam of 35 feet 8 inches (10.87 m) and a draught of 10 feet 0 inches (3.05 m) mean and 14 feet 3 inches (4.34 m) full load. Displacement was 1,802 long tons (1,831 t) standard and 2,530 long tons (2,570 t) full load. Two Admiralty 3-drum water-tube boilers supplied steam at 300 pounds per square inch (2,100 kPa) and 630 °F (332 °C) to two sets of Parsons single-reduction geared steam turbines, which drove two propeller shafts. The machinery was rated at 40,000 shaft horsepower (30,000 kW) giving a maximum speed of 36 knots (67 km/h; 41 mph) and 32 knots (59 km/h; 37 mph) at full load. 615 tons of oil were carried, giving a range of 4,675 nautical miles (8,658 km; 5,380 mi) at 20 knots (37 km/h; 23 mph).

The ship had a main gun armament of four 4.7 inch (120 mm) QF Mk. IX guns on single CP Mk XXII mountings, capable of elevating to an angle of 55 degrees, giving a degree of anti-aircraft capability. The intended close-in anti-aircraft armament for the class was one Hazemayer stabilised twin mount for the Bofors 40 mm gun and four twin Oerlikon 20 mm cannons, although limited availability of the Bofors mount meant that Troubridge was completed with an additional two single Oerlikon guns instead. The Oerlikons were gradually replaced by Bofors guns as the war progressed, with Troubridge being fitted with two single Bofors guns in 1944, with further guns (with one single mount on the searchlight platform and possibly another four power operated mounts) added on joining the British Pacific Fleet. Two quadruple mounts for 21 inch (533 mm) torpedoes were fitted, while the ship had a depth charge outfit of four depth charge mortars and two racks, with a total of 70 charges carried.

Troubridge was fitted with a Type 291 air warning radar on the ship's tripod foremast, with a Type 285 fire control radar integrated with the ship's high-angle gun director. A high-frequency direction finding (HF/DF) aerial was fitted to a lattice mainmast. Troubridge was fitted as a leader, and as such had a crew of 225 officers and other ranks.

=== Type 15 modification ===
After the end of the Second World War and as the Cold War started, the Royal Navy found itself with a shortage of fast anti-submarine escorts capable of dealing with modern Soviet diesel-electric submarines, with existing sloops and frigates too slow. At the same time, the relatively recent War Emergency destroyers, with their low-angle guns and basic fire control systems, were considered unsuitable for modern warfare, so it was decided to convert these obsolete destroyers into fast escorts, acting as a stop-gap solution until new-build ships, such as the Type 12 frigates could be built in sufficient numbers. The Type 15 frigate was a rebuild of War Emergency destroyers into 'first-rate' anti-submarine ships, with similar anti-submarine equipment as the new frigates. The ships' superstructure and armament was removed, with the ships' forecastle extended rearwards and a new, low but full width superstructure fitted. The revised ships had a much reduced gun armament of one twin 4-inch (102 mm) anti aircraft mount aft of the main superstructure and one twin Bofors mount, but anti-submarine equipment was as fitted to the Type 12s, with Troubridge being fitted with two Limbo anti-submarine mortars, directed by Type 170 and 172 sonar. Troubridge was completed with a modified design of bridge to the other Type 15 ships, which was higher and had angled sides to improve visibility. She was the only T-class destroyer converted to Type 15 standard, with the other ships converted to the cheaper but less effective Type 16 frigate design. She, together with Ulster and Zest, and was the last Type 15 conversion completed.

== Construction ==
Troubridge was laid down at John Brown & Company's Clydebank shipyard on 10 November 1941 and was launched on 23 September 1942. She was completed on 8 March 1943, and assigned the Pennant number R00.

== Service history ==
=== Second World War ===
On commissioning, Troubridge was sent to the Mediterranean, joining the 24th Destroyer Flotilla. Troubridge took part in Operation Corkscrew, the reduction by bombardment and capture of the island of Pantellaria. On 31 May 1943, Troubridge and the destroyer Petard accompanied the light cruiser Orion when Orion shelled the island, and on 2/3 June Troubridge, Orion and the destroyer Paladin shelled Pantellaria again. On 5 June the cruiser Newfoundland together with Troubridge and Paladin bombarded the island, while on 8 June the bombardment force consisted of the cruisers Aurora, Newfoundland, Orion, Penelope and Euryalus, together in conjunction with the destroyers Troubridge, Jervis, Laforey, Lookout, Loyal. Nubian, Tartar and Whaddon. Finally, on the night of 10/11 June Troubridge accompanied an invasion force to the island, which surrendered without fighting on 11 June. On 10 July Troubridge formed part of the covering force for Operation Husky, the Allied invasion of Sicily, with the force patrolling in the Ionian Sea to prevent intervention by the Italian Navy.

After the Allies conquered Sicily, their next step was the invasion of mainland Italy. From 31 August Troubridge took part in Operation Baytown, their landings in Calabria, escorting the bombardment force and providing artillery support herself, while on 9 September she took part in Operation Avalanche, the Allied landings at Salerno, where she formed part of the covering force. In early 1944, the 24th Flotilla moved to the Adriatic, with Troubridge carrying out bombardment operations against targets on the Dalmatian coast and the island of Korčula. On 15 August 1944, the Allies invaded the South of France, with Troubridge forming part of the screen for the Escort carriers of TG88.1, which were providing air cover for the landings. In September 1944 Troubridge, with the rest of her flotilla, returned to the Aegean, where they were employed in interfering with the German evacuation of the Greek islands. On 13 September Troubridge and sister ship Tuscan sank the cargo ship Toni, while on 19 September Troubridge, Terpsichore, and the Polish destroyer ORP Garland depth-charged and sank the German submarine U-407 south of Milos, in position 36°27'N, 24°33'E.

After a refit at Chatham in December 1944 to January 1945, Troubridge set out for eastern waters for the war against Japan. She briefly served with the East Indies Fleet in March 1945 before joining the British Pacific Fleet in May 1945. Amongst other engagements, she took part in an attack on Truk led by the aircraft carrier Implacable on 14–15 June. Implacable's air group launched strikes against Truk on 14 July and Troubridge escorted the cruiser Newfoundland when she bombarded coastal artillery positions and an airfield on 15 July. She returned to Portsmouth in 1946.

=== Postwar service ===
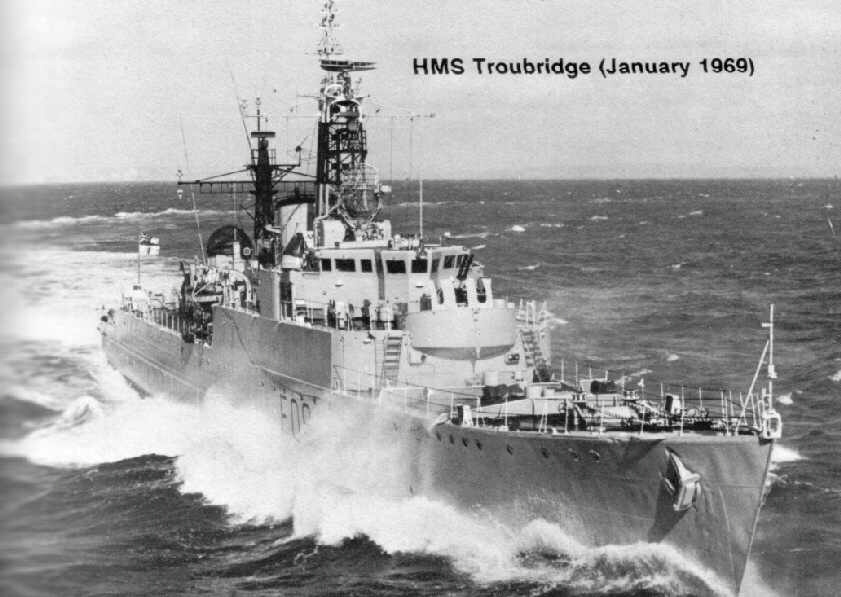
Troubridge after conversion to Type 15 Frigate

In December 1946, Troubridge replaced Saumarez, badly damaged by a mine off Albania, as leader of the 3rd Destroyer Flotilla (later Squadron) in the Mediterranean, returning to Chatham on 16 August 1949, where she was placed in reserve at Chatham Dockyard.

Between 1955 and 1957 she was converted into a Type 15 fast anti-submarine frigate by Portsmouth Dockyard and J S White at Cowes on the Isle of Wight. She also received a new pennant number F09. Troubridge recommissioned on 9 July 1957, and in December that year she became part of the 8th Frigate Squadron for service on the America and West Indies Station. In January–February 1958, Troubridge took Lord Hailes, the Governor-General of the West Indies Federation on a tour of the West Indies, and in April that year, she was at Trinidad for the opening of the Federal Parliament of the West Indies Federation. On 21 August 1958, Troubridge was ordered to Grenada in response to a strike on the island, with a detachment being landed to run the island's power station and restore electricity until the strike ended on 26 August. In 1959 Troubridge took part in 'Navy Days' in Portsmouth during that year. Following this she was again deployed to the West Indies.

On 29 May 1961, the Danish frigate Niels Ebbersen attempted to arrest the British trawler Red Crusader off the Faroe Islands for fishing in a prohibited area. Niels Ebbersen put an unarmed boarding party aboard the trawler, but instead of heading for Tórshavn as instructed, Red Crusader set course for Britain with the boarding party still on board. Niels Ebbersen fired warning shots at Red Crusader, and when those failed, fired solid shot, which slightly damaged the trawler, which continued towards Scotland with Niels Ebbersen in pursuit. Troubridge and the British minesweeper Wotton then arrived on the scene, and after a consultation between the commanders of the four ships, the Danish boarding party returned to Niels Ebbersen, while Troubridge and Wotton escorted Red Crusader into Aberdeen, with Niels Ebberson following in nominal pursuit until the ships reached British territorial waters. An international commission later ruled that Niels Ebbersen had used excessive force in the confrontation with Red Crusader. At the end of October 1961, Troubridge, together with the frigate Londonderry and the survey ship Vidal, carried out relief operations in Belize following Hurricane Hattie. On 3 November 1961 Troubridge was the first ship to enter Belize harbour after the hurricane. Troubridge's crew helped to restore water supplies and attempted to repair Belize's power station.

After rioting in Georgetown, British Guiana on 16 February 1962, Troubridge, at Trinidad when the disturbances broke out, was ordered to Georgetown, acting as a command post for Britain's response, and with detachments of her crew carrying out patrols on shore and fighting fires.

On 15 May 1963 she was towed from Portsmouth to Malta for refit. She recommissioned on 7 September 1964 and was part of the 27th Escort Squadron, serving in the Far East. along with the vessels Galatea, Agincourt and Carysfort.

On 8 September 1966 she entered refit at Portsmouth Dockyard. Between 1966 and 1968 she was commanded by Richard Thomas.

=== Decommissioning and disposal ===
Troubridge was decommissioned for the last time on 29 March 1969 at Chatham. She was subsequently sold for scrap and arrived at the yard of John Cashmore Ltd at Newport, Wales on 5 May 1970.

== In popular culture ==
Troubridge was the punning inspiration for the fictional "HMS TrouTbridge" in the long-running Radio Comedy The Navy Lark. (The September 1967 episode is entitled Troutbridge's Silver Jubilee, which exactly accords with Troubridge's own September 1942 launch date and the crew were the audience for the December 1960 episode "Johnson's Birthday").

HMS Troubridge also supplied the landing crew which rescued the marooned children at the end of the 1963 film version of William Golding's Lord of the Flies. The destroyer's name can be seen on the caps of two sailors among the landing party.

In a very different role, Troubridge was used to depict the interior of the fictional "USS Bedford" in the 1965 cold-war film drama The Bedford Incident. British military equipment is visible in several shots, including a rack of Lee–Enfield rifles. Troubridge's novel forward-sloping bridge windows are also to be seen in the Bridge shots. (The Type 15 frigate used for the opening scenes is F159: HMS Wakeful).

== Bibliography ==
- Campbell, N.J.M. (1980). "Great Britain". In Chesneau, Roger (ed.). Conway's All the World's Fighting Ships 1922–1946. New York: Mayflower Books. pp. 2–85. ISBN 0-8317-0303-2.
- Colledge, J. J.; Warlow, Ben (2006) [1969]. Ships of the Royal Navy: The Complete Record of All Fighting Ships of the Royal Navy from the 15th Century to the Present (3rd Rev ed.). London: Chatham Publishing. ISBN 978-1-86176-281-8. OCLC 67375475.
- Critchley, Mike (1982). British Warships Since 1945: Part 3: Destroyers. Liskeard, UK: Maritime Books. ISBN 0-9506323-9-2.
- English, John (2008). Obdurate to Daring: British Fleet Destroyers 1941–45. Windsor, UK: World Ship Society. ISBN 978-0-9560769-0-8.
- Friedman, Norman (2008). British Destroyers & Frigates: The Second World War and After. Barnsley, UK: Seaforth Publishing. ISBN 978-1-84832-015-4.
- Gardiner, Robert; Chumbley, Stephen, eds. (1995). Conway's All The World's Fighting Ships 1947–1995. Annapolis, Maryland: Naval Institute Press. ISBN 1-55750-132-7.
- Hobbs, Davis (2017). The British Pacific Fleet: The Royal Navy's Most Powerful Strike Force. Barnsley, UK: Seaforth Publishing. ISBN 978-1-5267-0283-8.
- Johnson, D. H. N. (July 1961). "Law of the Sea". The International and Comparative Law Quarterly. 10 (3): 587–597. doi:10.1093/iclqaj/10.3.587. JSTOR 755929.
- Lenton, H. T. (1970). Navies of the Second World War: British Fleet & Escort Destroyers Volume Two. London: Macdonald & Co. ISBN 0-356-03122-5.
- Marriott, Leo (1983). Royal Navy Frigates 1945–1983. Shepperton, UK: Ian Allan. ISBN 0-7110-1322-5.
- Marriott, Leo (1989). Royal Navy Destroyers Since 1945. Ian Allan. ISBN 0-7110-1817-0.
- Raven, Alan; Roberts, John (1978). War Built Destroyers O to Z Classes. London: Bivouac Books. ISBN 0-85680-010-4.
- Richardson, Ian (August 2021). Osborne, Richard (ed.). "Type 15 Frigates, Part 2: Ship Histories". Warships: Marine News Supplement. 75 (8): 381–391. ISSN 0966-6958.
- Roberts, John (2009). Safeguarding the Nation: The Story of the Modern Royal Navy. Annapolis, Maryland, US: Naval Institute Press. ISBN 978-1-59114-812-8.
- Rohwer, Jürgen; Hümmelchen, Gerhard (1992). Chronology of the War at Sea 1939–1945. London: Greenhill Books. ISBN 1-85367-117-7.
- Roskill, S. W. (1960). The War at Sea 1939–1945: Volume III: The Offensive: Part I 1st June 1943–31st May 1944. London: Her Majesty's Stationery Office.
- Whitley, M. J. (2000). Destroyers of World War 2: An International Encyclopedia. London: Cassell & Co. ISBN 1-85409-521-8.
