= Tyrian =

Tyrian may refer to the following:

- Tyre, Lebanon, an adjective for Tyre, a city in the South Governorate of Lebanon
- Tyrian (video game), an arcade-style shooter video game by Epic MegaGames
- Tyrian purple, a colour
- Tyrian, a person who worships the Old Norse god, Tyr
- HMS Tyrian, the name of five ships of the Royal Navy
