= Task Force 88 =

Task Force 88 may refer to:

- Operation Argus: 1950s nuclear weapons test program
- Task Force 88 (Operation Dragoon), an Escort carrier force that participated in Operation Dragoon
- Task Force 88 (Pakistan Navy), see 34th Light Infantry Division § Organization
- Task Force 88 (United States Navy)
