= HMS Liddesdale =

Destroyer of the Royal Navy

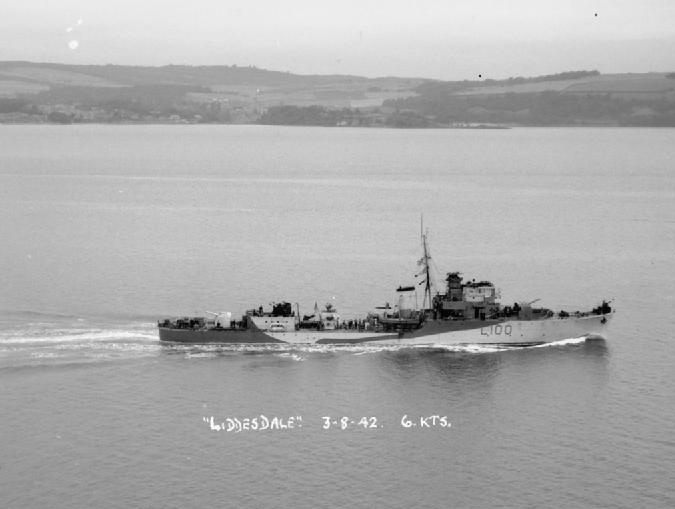
- HMS Liddesdale

History

United Kingdom
- Name: Liddesdale
- Ordered: 4 September 1939
- Builder: Vickers-Armstrongs (Newcastle-on-Tyne, U.K.): Parsons
- Laid down: 20 November 1939
- Launched: 19 August 1940
- Commissioned: 28 February 1941
- Identification: Pennant number: L100
- Fate: Scrapped in 1948 at Gateshead

General characteristics
- Class & type: Hunt-class destroyer
- Displacement: 1,000 long tons (1,016 t) standard; 1,340 long tons (1,362 t) full load
- Length: 85.3 m (279 ft 10 in) o/a
- Beam: 10.16 m (33 ft 4 in)
- Draught: 3.51 m (11 ft 6 in)
- Propulsion: 2 Admiralty 3-drum boilers; 2 shaft Parsons geared turbines, 19,000 shp
- Speed: 27 knots (31 mph; 50 km/h); 25.5 kn (29.3 mph; 47.2 km/h) full
- Range: 2,350 nmi (4,350 km) at 20 kn (37 km/h)
- Complement: 168
- Armament: 4 × QF 4 in Mark XVI guns on twin mounts Mk. XIX; 4 × QF 2 pdr Mk. VIII on quad mount MK.VII; 2 × 20 mm Oerlikons on single mounts P Mk. III; 2 × 21 in (533 mm) torpedo tubes; 110 depth charges, 4 throwers, 3 racks

HMS Liddesdale was a Type II Hunt-class destroyer of the Royal Navy built by Vickers-Armstrongs in Newcastle and launched on 19 August 1940. She was laid down on 20 November 1939 and commissioned 28 February 1941. She served as a convoy escort in the Mediterranean Sea.

== War service ==
HMS Liddesdale served as a convoy escort based from Malta for the majority of World War II. On 21 May 1944, Liddesdale, alongside the destroyers Termagant and Tenacious sank U-453 using depth charges off the south coast of Italy.
