= F67 =

F67 may refer to:

- F67 type frigate or Tourville-class frigate type, a class of large high-sea destroyers of the French Navy specialised in anti-submarine warfare
- HMS Bedouin (F67), Tribal-class destroyer of the British Royal Navy that saw service in World War II
- HMS Tyrian (F67), S-class destroyer built for the Royal Navy during the Second World War
