= USS Kasaan Bay =

Casablanca-class escort carrier of the U.S. Navy

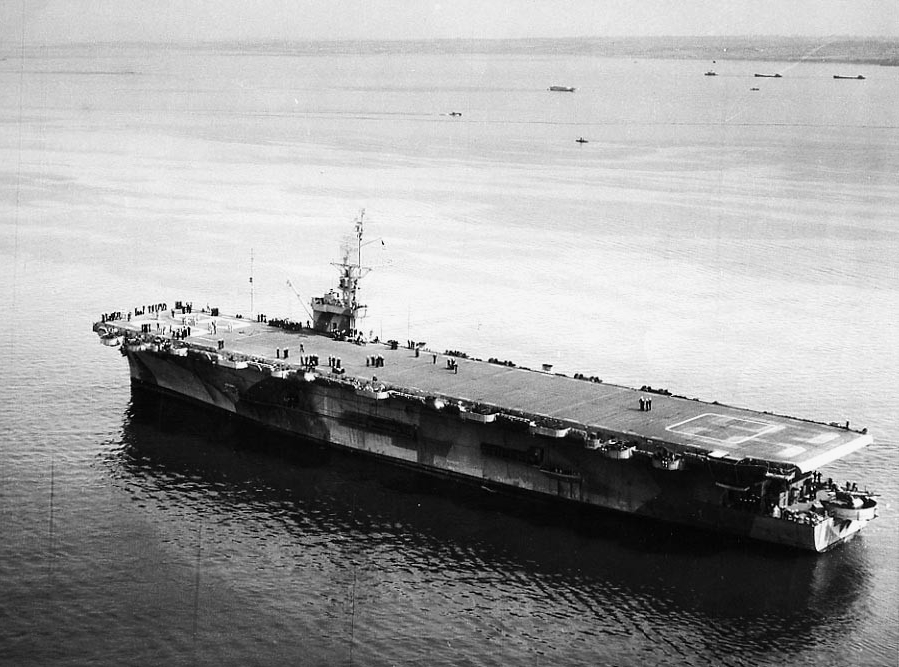
- USS Kasaan Bay anchored in Narragansett Bay, Rhode Island, 16 September 1944

History

United States
- Name: Kasaan Bay
- Namesake: Kasaan Bay, Prince of Wales Island, Alaska
- Ordered: as a Type S4-S2-BB3 hull, MC hull 1106
- Awarded: 18 June 1942
- Builder: Kaiser Shipyards
- Laid down: 11 May 1943
- Launched: 24 October 1943
- Commissioned: 4 December 1943
- Decommissioned: 6 July 1946
- Stricken: 1 March 1959
- Identification: Hull symbol: CVE-69
- Nickname(s): "Sassy Kassy"
- Honors and awards: 1 Battle star
- Fate: Scrapped in March 1960

General characteristics
- Class & type: Casablanca-class escort carrier
- Displacement: 8,188 long tons (8,319 t) (standard); 10,902 long tons (11,077 t) (full load)
- Length: 512 ft 3 in (156.13 m) (oa); 490 ft (150 m) (wl); 474 ft (144 m) (fd)
- Beam: 65 ft 2 in (19.86 m); 108 ft (33 m) (extreme width)
- Draft: 20 ft 9 in (6.32 m) (max)
- Installed power: 4 × Babcock & Wilcox boilers; 9,000 shp (6,700 kW)
- Propulsion: 2 × Skinner Unaflow reciprocating steam engines; 2 × screws
- Speed: 19 knots (35 km/h; 22 mph)
- Range: 10,240 nmi (18,960 km; 11,780 mi) at 15 kn (28 km/h; 17 mph)
- Complement: Total: 910 – 916 officers and men; Embarked Squadron: 50 – 56; Ship's Crew: 860
- Armament: As designed: 1 × 5 in (127 mm)/38 cal dual-purpose gun; 4 × twin 40 mm (1.57 in) Bofors anti-aircraft guns; 12 × 20 mm (0.79 in) Oerlikon anti-aircraft cannons; Varied, ultimate armament: 1 × 5 in (127 mm)/38 cal dual-purpose gun; 8 × twin 40 mm (1.57 in) Bofors anti-aircraft guns; 20 × 20 mm (0.79 in) Oerlikon anti-aircraft cannons
- Aircraft carried: 27
- Aviation facilities: 1 × catapult; 2 × elevators

Service record
- Part of: United States Atlantic Fleet (1943–1944); United States Pacific Fleet (1944–1946); Atlantic Reserve Fleet (1946–1959)
- Operations: Operation Magic Carpet; Operation Dragoon

USS Kasaan Bay (CVE-69) was the fifteenth of fifty Casablanca-class escort carriers built for the United States Navy during World War II. She was named after Kasaan Bay, a name assigned to the bay by the local Haida Indians. The bay is located within Prince of Wales Island, which at the time was a part of the Territory of Alaska. The ship was launched in October 1943, commissioned in December, and served as a transport carrier in both the Atlantic and the Pacific, as well as taking part in Operation Dragoon, the Allied invasion of occupied Southern France. Her aircraft provided air support and strategic bombing capabilities, disrupting German supply lines, and earning Kasaan Bay a battle star. Postwar, she participated in Operation Magic Carpet. Ultimately, she was broken up in March 1960.

== Design and description ==
A side profile of the design of Thetis Bay.

Kasaan Bay was a Casablanca-class escort carrier, the most numerous type of aircraft carriers ever built. Built to stem heavy losses during the Battle of the Atlantic, they came into service in late 1943, by which time the U-boat threat was already in retreat. Although some did see service in the Atlantic, the majority were utilized in the Pacific, ferrying aircraft, providing logistics support, and conducting close air support for the island-hopping campaigns. The Casablanca-class carriers were built on the standardized Type S4-S2-BB3 hull, a lengthened variant of the Doyen-class hull, and specifically designed to be mass-produced using welded prefabricated sections. This allowed them to be produced at unprecedented speeds: the final ship of her class, Munda, was delivered to the Navy just 101 days after the laying of her keel.

Kasaan Bay was 512 ft 3 in (156.13 m) long overall (490 ft (150 m) at the waterline), had a beam of 65 ft 2 in (19.86 m), and a draft of 20 ft 9 in (6.32 m). She displaced 8,188 long tons (8,319 t) standard, which increased to 10,902 long tons (11,077 t) with a full load. To carry out flight operations, the ship had a 257 ft (78 m) hangar deck and a 474 ft (144 m) flight deck. Her compact size necessitated the installation of an aircraft catapult at her bow, and there were two aircraft elevators to facilitate movement of aircraft between the flight and hangar deck: one each fore and aft.

She was powered by four Babcock & Wilcox Express D boilers that raised 285 psi (1,970 kPa) of steam at 577 °F (303 °C). The steam generated by these boilers fed two Skinner Unaflow reciprocating steam engines, delivering 9,000 hp (6,700 kW) to two propeller shafts. This allowed her to reach speeds of 19 kn (35 km/h; 22 mph), with a cruising range of 10,240 nmi (18,960 km; 11,780 mi) at 15 kn (28 km/h; 17 mph). For armament, one 5 in (127 mm)/38 caliber dual-purpose gun was mounted on the stern. Additional anti-aircraft defense was provided by eight Bofors 40 mm (1.57 in) anti-aircraft guns in single mounts and twelve Oerlikon 20 mm (0.79 in) cannons mounted around the perimeter of the deck. By 1945, Casablanca-class carriers had been modified to carry twenty Oerlikon cannons and sixteen Bofors guns; the doubling of the latter was accomplished by putting them into twin mounts. Sensors onboard consisted of a SG surface-search radar and a SK air-search radar.

Although Casablanca-class escort carriers were intended to function with a crew of 860 and an embarked squadron of 50 to 56, the exigencies of wartime often necessitated the inflation of the crew count. They were designed to operate with 27 aircraft, but the hangar deck could accommodate much more during transport or training missions. During Operation Dragoon, she carried 24 F6F-5 Hellcat fighters, 3 TBF Avenger torpedo bombers, and 8 F6F-3N Hellcat variant night fighters for a total of 35 aircraft, a rare occurrence, as Hellcats typically tended to operate on fleet carriers, rather than escort carriers.

== Service history ==
=== World War II ===
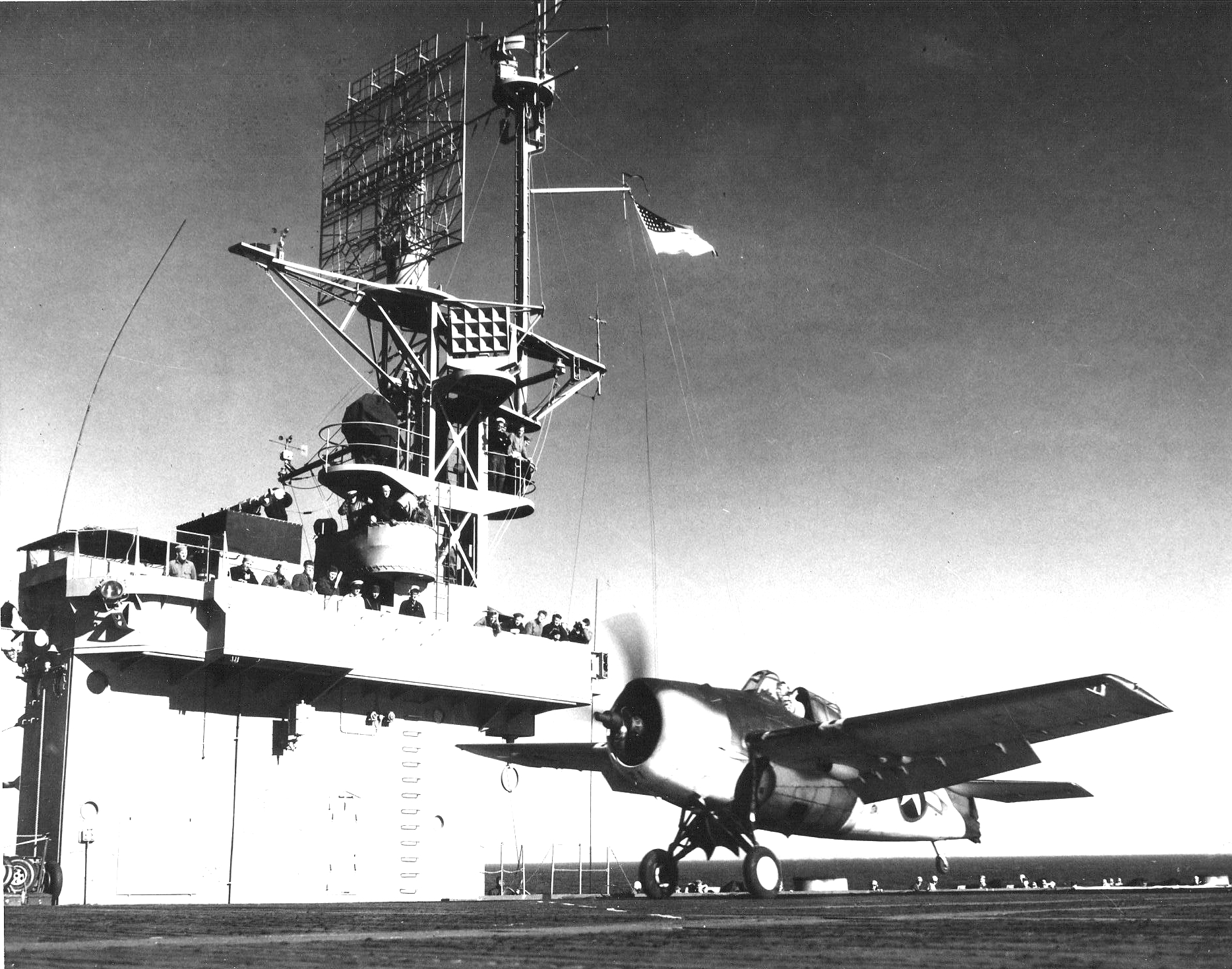
An FM-1 Wildcat fighter aircraft takes off from the deck of Kasaan Bay, 6 February 1944.

Upon being commissioned, Kasaan Bay underwent a shakedown cruise down the West Coast to San Diego. Upon finishing, she was assigned to transport duty, and sailed from San Francisco on 8 January 1944 with a load of aircraft and passengers, bound for Pearl Harbor. After returning to Naval Air Station San Diego, she was assigned to the Atlantic Fleet and sailed for Norfolk, arriving on 28 February for overhaul and operations along the East Coast. On 28 May, she left New York City in conjunction with her sisters Tulagi and Mission Bay, ferrying aircraft on a round trip to Casablanca, French Morocco. She arrived at Casablanca on 6 June, departed on 8 June, and returned to New York on 17 June, carrying onboard 342 survivors of the Bogue-class escort carrier Block Island, which had been torpedoed by a German U-boat on 29 May.

Upon returning to the East Coast, Kasaan Bay and Tulagi were informed that they were to take part in Operation Dragoon, the Allied landings in Southern France. She first took on her fighting aircraft contingent Fighter Squadron (VF) 74, commanded by Lieutenant Commander H. Brinkley Bass, before heading to Quonset Point, Rhode Island, arriving on 29 June, where Rear Admiral Calvin T. Durgin and his staff turned Tulagi into his flagship. The next day, on 30 June, Kasaan Bay and Tulagi left port, accompanied by six destroyer escorts as a part of Task Group 27.7, heading for Oran, French Algeria. En route, the two carriers conducted extensive exercises, as both the carriers' crews and their aircraft contingents were relatively inexperienced.

Arriving at Oran on 10 July, Task Group 27.7 dissolved, with Durgin heading for Naples, Allied occupied Italy for invasion planning. In the meantime, Kasaan Bay participated in training and spotting exercises off of the Algerian coast. On 17 July, the force, now reconstituted as Task Group 80.2, which now had a wholly new complement of escorting destroyers, left Oran for Malta. During the passage, the screening Gleaves-class destroyer Niblack picked up a suspicious contact on sonar and dropped depth charges. As one of Kasaan Bay's Avengers was up on anti-submarine patrol at the time, it headed for Niblack's course and assisted in dropping more depth charges, albeit their combined efforts resulted in no apparent results.

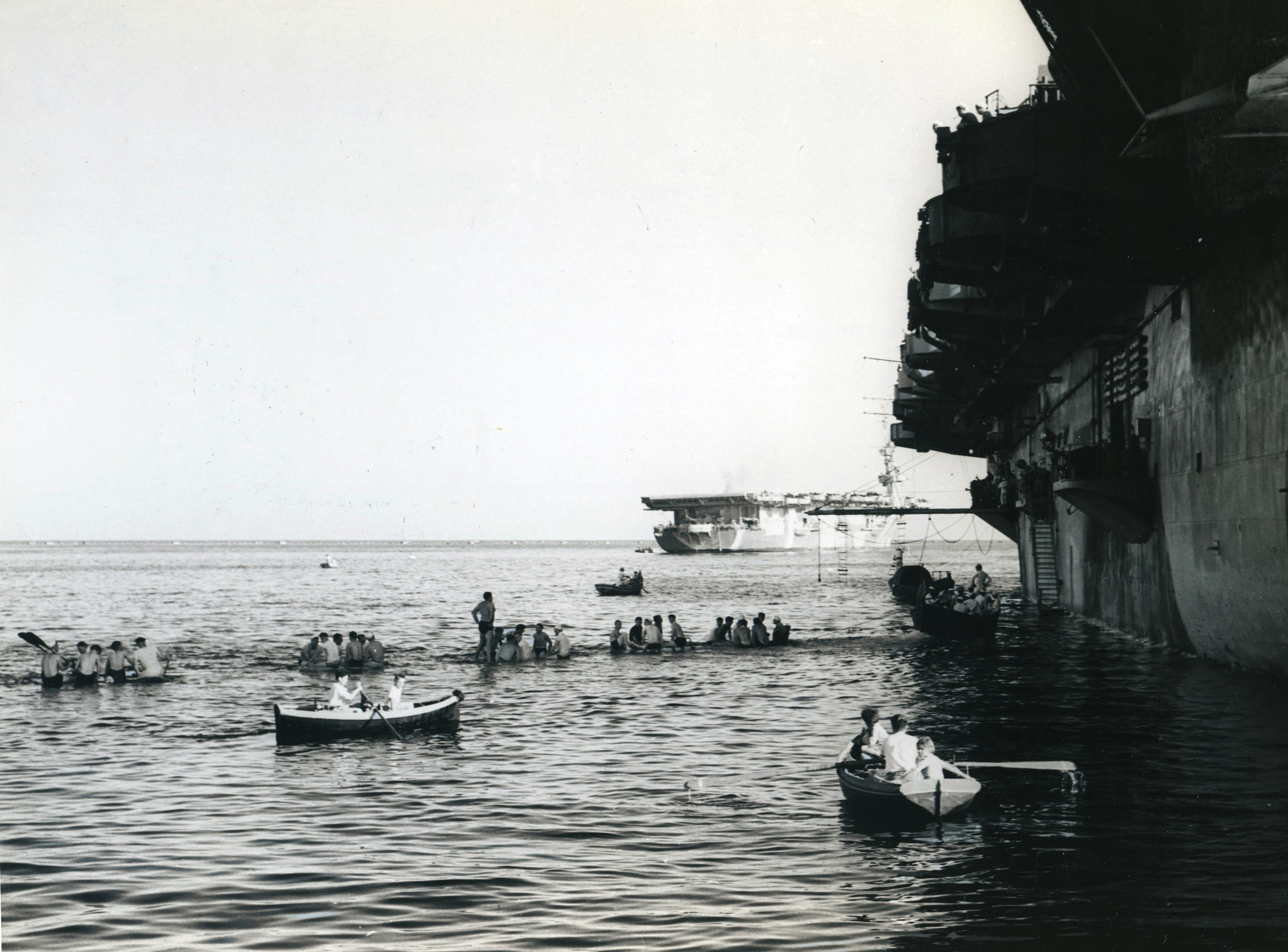
Tulagi (foreground) and Kasaan Bay photographed anchored at Malta.

The task group, stopping at Malta on 26 July, took Durgin back on board, and had the British Bogue-class escort carriers Hunter and Stalker join the force. Both of the British ships had 24 Supermarine Seafire fighters on board, and would assist in providing a fighter screen throughout the operation. Later that same day, the task group departed for Alexandria, Egypt, for additional training operations. Arriving at Alexandria, the task group was assigned to operate under the command of Rear admiral Thomas Hope Troubridge, as a part of Task Force 88. Thus, her task group's code was changed to Task Group 88.2. Altogether, Task Force 88 would consist of nine carriers, two British light cruisers, six U.S. destroyers, and six British minelayers. After conducting exercises, the Task Group returned to Malta on 3 August, and then proceeded onwards to Salerno on 7 August in order to take part in a dress rehearsal of the invasion. During the transit, Kasaan Bay's Avengers and Hellcat night fighters were detached and sent to Corsica. On 10 August, the Task Force was back in Malta.

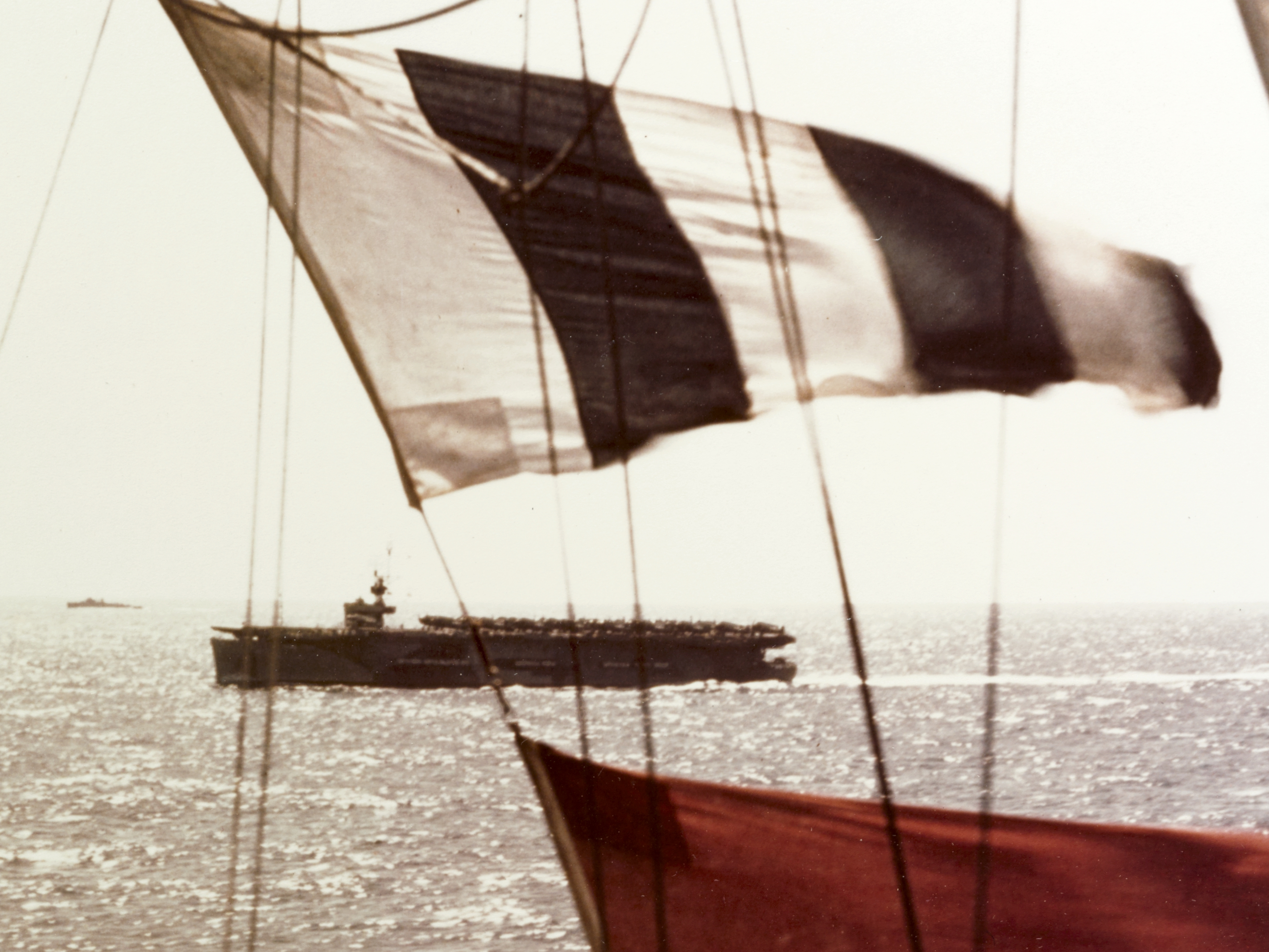
Kasaan Bay photographed through the signal flags of Tulagi, 15 August 1944.

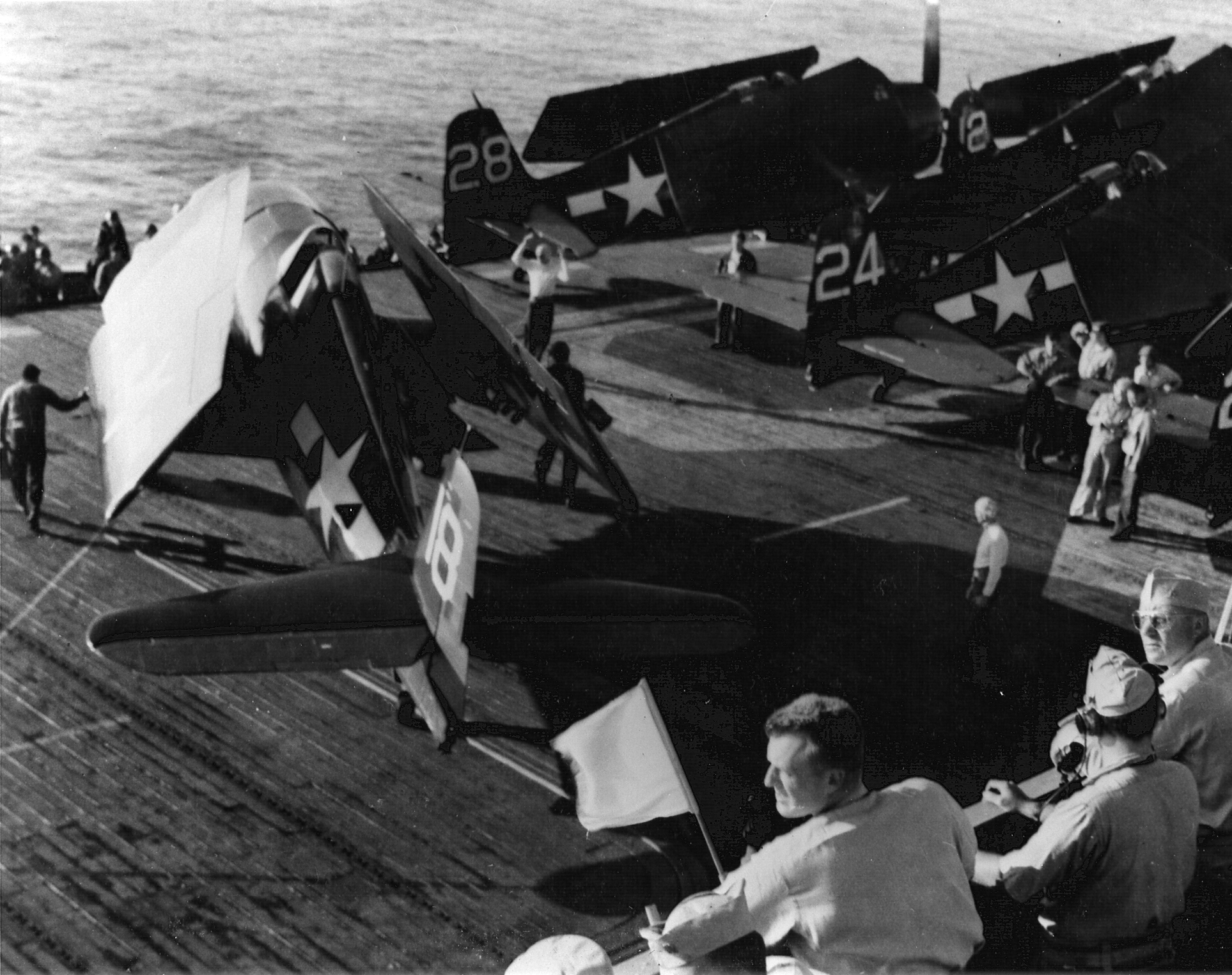
Multiple F6F Hellcats, with their wings folded up, on the flight deck of Kasaan Bay, 15 August 1944. One of the Hellcats is being maneuvered into a launching position.

On 12 August, the Task Force sortied from Malta, this time to support the invasion. In order to deceive enemy observations regarding the force's intentions, the Task Force first headed due west, and upon reaching the longitude of Provence on the night on 13 August, turned due north. On the morning of 15 August, D-Day, the Allied surface forces opened fire on the German coastal defenses. For the next six days, Kasaan Bay and Tulagi provided close air support for the Seventh Army as it established its beachheads and pushed inland. There was generally very little resistance from the Germans in the air, with the Luftwaffe having been stretched thinly across multiple fronts, but the anti-aircraft fire was heavy at times. The initial targets for VF-74 were a group of four coastal batteries situated on Porquerolles, whilst the aircraft contingent of Tulagi, Observation Fighting Squadron (VOF) 1, directed naval surface fire. On the initial day of the landings, VF-74 tallied up sixty sorties.

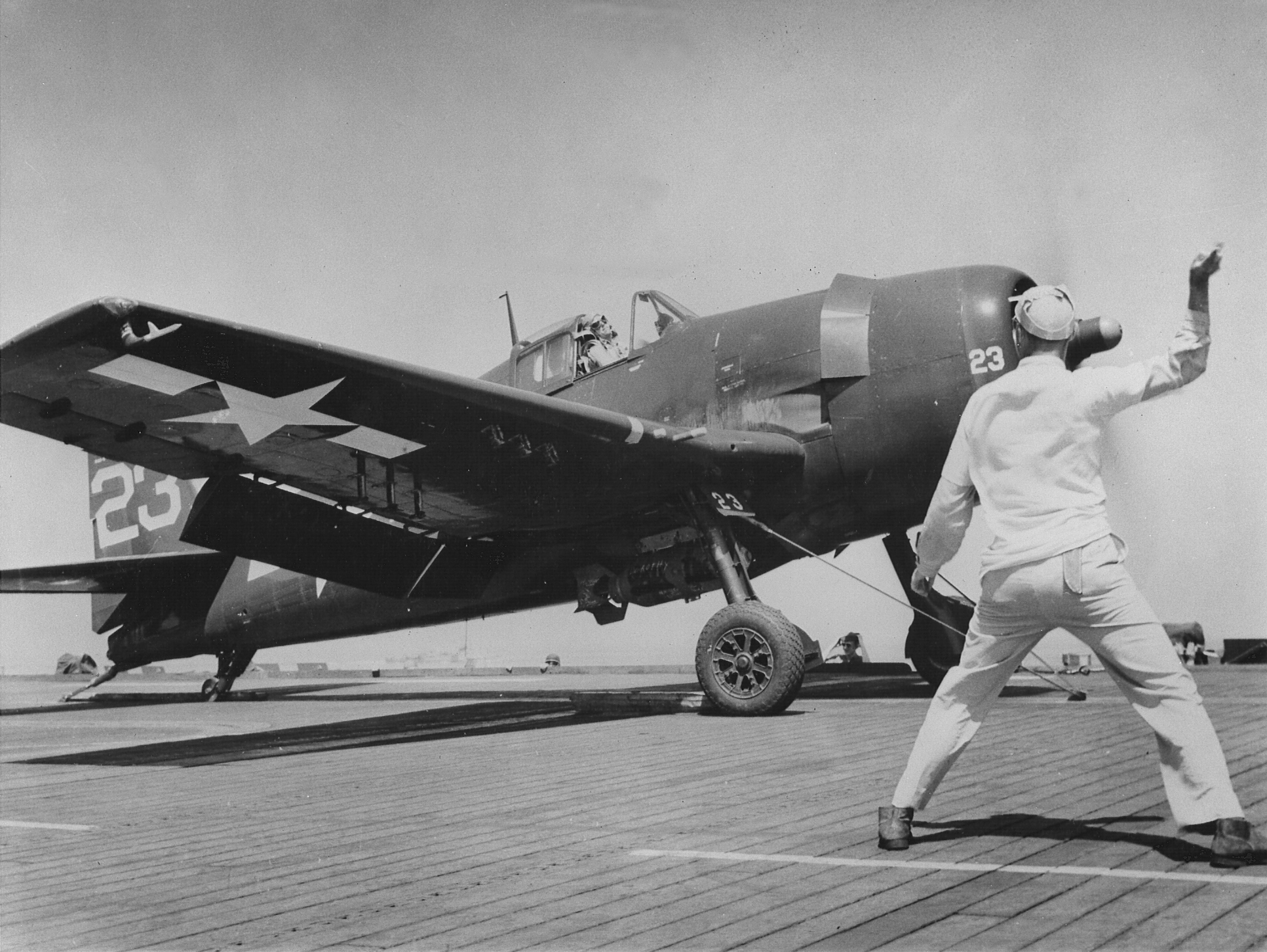
A F6F-5 variant Hellcat fighter of VF-74 preparing to be launched from the flight deck of Kasaan Bay in support of Operation Dragoon, 15 August 1944.

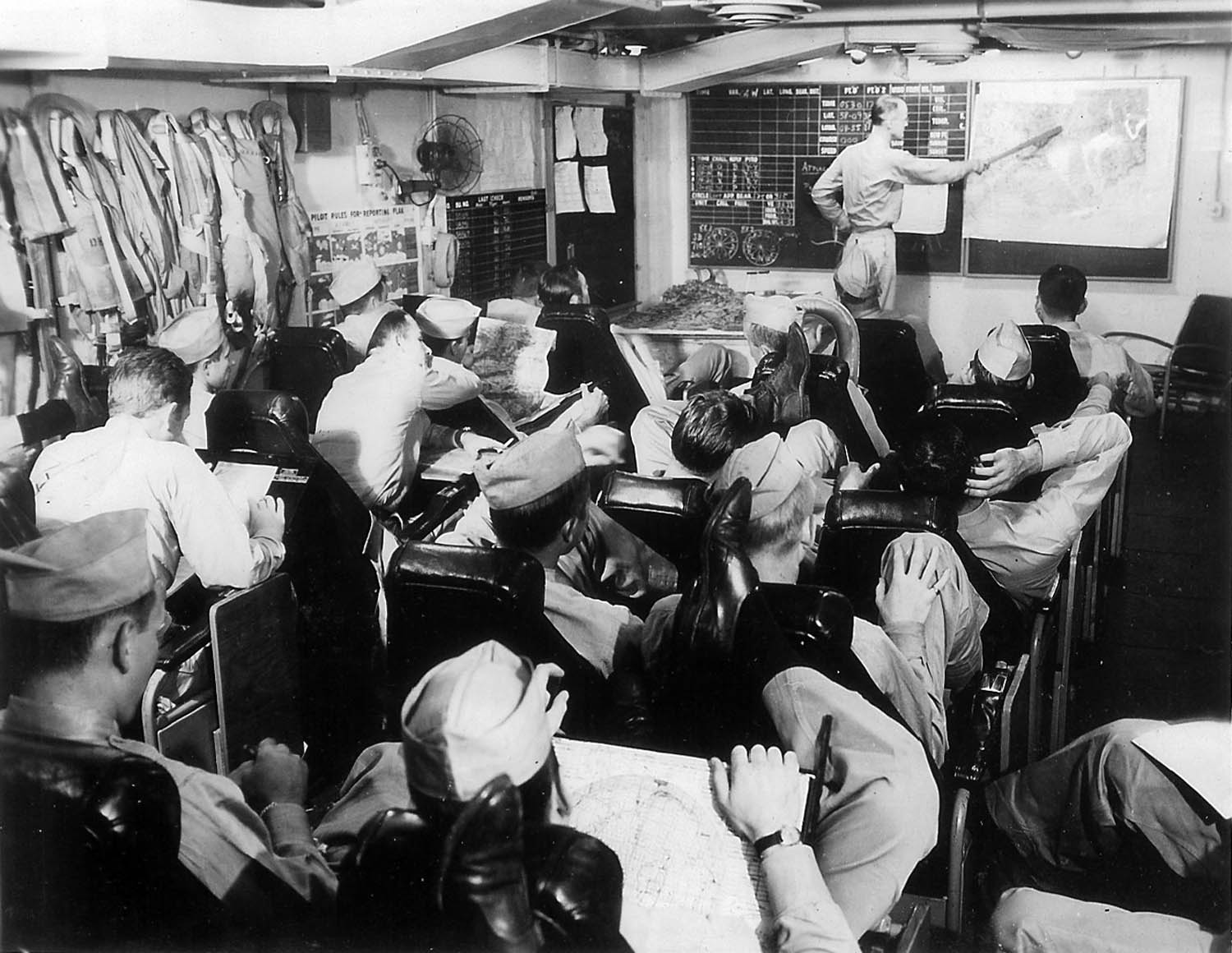
The pilots of VF-74 are briefed on a ground mission over Southern France in support of Operation Dragoon in Kasaan Bay's "Ready Room".

On 17 August, VF-74 launched a successful attack on a coastal battery situated on Port-Cros. However, on the last flight of the day, eight of VF-74's Hellcats had been launched, with instructions to opportunistically strike targets. Whilst the Hellcats were strafing a German truck convoy under the fading light, two of the Hellcats went missing, albeit whether it was due to German anti-aircraft fire or thunderstorms was never determined. Returning to the carrier, another Hellcat went into the flight deck's crash barrier, blocking the deck, and forcing the remaining Hellcats to divert to Tulagi.

On the morning of 19 August, a Junkers Ju 88 bomber was intercepted by eight of Kasaan Bay's Hellcats, led by VF-74's skipper, Bass, and shot down. Later that same day, six of Kasaan Bay's Hellcats intercepted and shot down a lone Dornier Do 217 bomber. On the morning of 20 August, the second flight of the day for VF-74, consisting of six Hellcats, involved strafing a train of ammunition wagons. In the course of the action, one of the wagons exploded, bringing down one of the Hellcats, and damaging two others, forcing them to return to ship. Near Villefranche-sur-Mer, one of the three remaining Hellcats was hit and downed by anti-aircraft fire, albeit the pilot escaped back to Allied lines via Bordeaux. On the afternoon of that same day, Bass was leading a group of eight Hellcats up the Rhône valley striking targets of opportunity. Spotting what appeared to be a German motorcycle, Bass dived his plane for an attack, but much too low. His Hellcat's belly tank was torn off, destabilizing the aircraft, and sending it into the ground, killing Bass. Later in that same mission, another Hellcat clipped an electrical transmission line, tearing off a part of its left wing. However, the pilot was able to maneuver the plane into a safe landing onto a ground runway at Ramatuelle.

At the end of the day on 21 August, after the escort carriers had retrieved their aircraft, (incidentally, during this process, Kasaan Bay recorded her 2,000th landing), Task Group 88.2 retired to Maddalena, Sardinia, to refuel and resupply. However, finding bombs trimmed to the American standard that would enable them to be utilized by her Hellcats proved to be an elusive task, even after proceeding southwards to Propriano, Corsica. Thus, the ordnancemen on Kasaan Bay found it necessary to grind the bomb suspension lugs of other bombs in order to trim them to the extent such that they would be compatible with her Hellcats' bomb racks. The task group was back off the coast of the French Riviera on 23 August, but by then, the frontlines had proceeded farther inland and quieted down. Kasaan Bay's F6F-3N night fighters had their radar gunsights stripped off, with the intention of only using them for screening missions from then onwards. Nonetheless, both Kasaan Bay and Tulagi continued conducting close air support missions until 30 August, when the task group headed for Ajaccio, Corsica, and dissolved, with ground based air bases having been secured and repaired to the extent as to render the escort carriers redundant. In the course of thirteen days of frontline duty, the two escort carriers had lost 11 Hellcats, but shot down 8 German planes, destroyed 825 trucks and other vehicles, damaging 334 more, destroyed 84 locomotives, and recorded significant damage on German supply lines and infrastructure. Three of the men from VF-74 and VOF-1 received Navy Crosses during that short period of combat.

Leaving her aircraft contingent behind, Kasaan Bay first headed back to Oran, before leaving port on 6 September, arriving back at Norfolk on 18 September. She conducted another roundtrip aircraft transport mission to Casablanca in late October, returning to the East Coast in November. There, Captain Albert Noble Perkins took over command of the vessel, and she was assigned to the United States Pacific Fleet. Steaming westwards, she arrived at San Diego on 2 January 1945, and ferried aircraft to Pearl Harbor, Guam, and Ulithi throughout January, where they would be used to resupply the frontline Fast Carrier Task Force. Having completed her mission, she returned to Pearl Harbor on 14 February, where she served as a training carrier, providing pilot qualifications in the waters off of Hawaii. She continued this duty until early June, when she was assigned to conduct antisubmarine operations in the shipping lines between the Marshall and Mariana Islands. Whilst she was undergoing these duties, word came of the Japanese surrender.

=== Post-war ===
Upon hearing of the end of the war, Kasaan Bay returned to Guam, where she joined the Operation Magic Carpet fleet, which repatriated U.S. servicemen from throughout the Pacific. She departed Saipan on 13 September with her first load of servicemen, steaming into San Diego on 30 September. Throughout the next three months, she made three cruises to Hawaii and the Philippines. Upon returning to San Francisco on 28 December, she headed for the East Coast on 29 January 1946, arriving at Boston on 22 February. She was decommissioned and mothballed on 31 July 1946, joining the Boston group of the Atlantic Reserve Fleet. On 12 June 1955, she was redesignated as a helicopter escort carrier, receiving the hull symbol CVHE-69. She was struck from the Navy list on 1 March 1959, and she was sold for scrapping on 2 February 1960. She was ultimately broken up in Hamburg, West Germany during March 1960. Kasaan Bay received one battle star for her World War II service.

== Sources ==
=== Online sources ===
- "Kasaan Bay (CVE-69)". Dictionary of American Naval Fighting Ships. Naval History and Heritage Command. 27 April 2016. Archived from the original on 21 March 2021. This article incorporates text from this source, which is in the public domain.
- "Kaiser Vancouver, Vancouver WA". ShipbuildingHistory.com. 27 November 2010. Archived from the original on 16 June 2019.
- "World Aircraft Carriers List: US Escort Carriers, S4 Hulls". Hazegray.org. 14 December 1998. Archived from the original on 19 November 2021.
- Maksel, Rebecca (14 August 2012). "How Do You Name an Aircraft Carrier?". Air & Space/Smithsonian.

=== Bibliography ===
- Adcock, Al (1996), Escort Carriers in Action - Warships No. 9, Carrollton, Texas: Squadron/Signal Publications, ISBN 9780897473569
- Bright, William (2004), Native American Placenames of the United States, University of Oklahoma Press, ISBN 9780806135984
- Chesneau, Robert; Gardiner, Robert (1980), Conway's All the World's Fighting Ships 1922–1946, London, England: Naval Institute Press, ISBN 9780870219139
- Friedman, Norman (1983), U.S. Aircraft Carriers: An Illustrated Design History, Annapolis, Maryland: Naval Institute Press, ISBN 9780870217395
- Ross, Al (1993), The Escort Carrier Gambier Bay, Anatomy of the Ship, London, England: Conway Maritime Press, ISBN 9781557502353
- Y'Blood, William (2012), Hunter-killer : U.S. Escort Carriers in the Battle of the Atlantic (E-book), Annapolis, Maryland: Naval Institute Press, ISBN 9780870212864
- Y'Blood, William T. (2012), The Little Giants: U.S. Escort Carriers Against Japan, Annapolis, Maryland: Naval Institute Press, ISBN 9781612512471
