= HNLMS Piet Hein =

HNLMS Piet Hein (Dutch: Hr.Ms. or Zr.Ms. Piet Hein) may refer to following ships of the Royal Netherlands Navy:

- HNLMS Piet Hein (1894), an Evertsen-class coastal defence ship
- HNLMS Piet Hein (1927), an Admiralen-class destroyer
- HNLMS Piet Hein (F811), a Kortenaer-class frigate, now the yacht Yas
- The ex-HMS Serapis, transferred to the Royal Netherlands Navy and renamed Piet Hein
