= HMS Swift (G46) =

1943 S-class destroyer of the Royal Navy

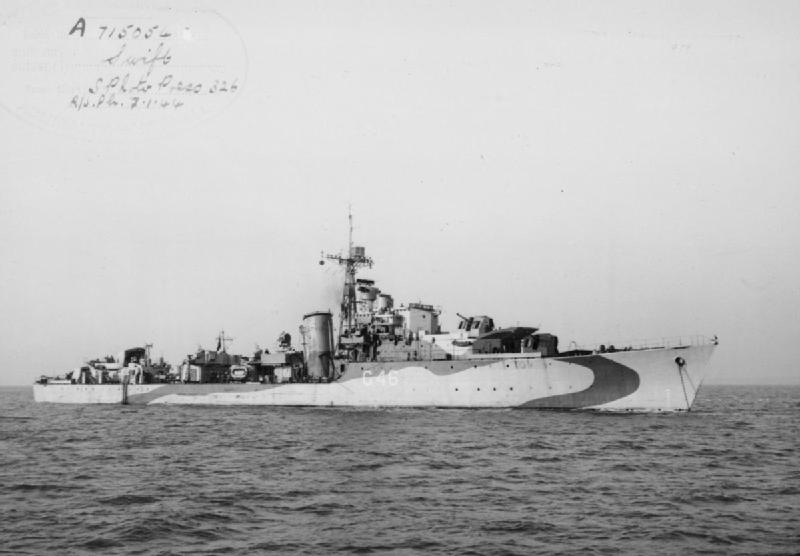

History

United Kingdom
- Name: Swift
- Ordered: 9 January 1941
- Builder: J. Samuel White, Cowes
- Yard number: 1922
- Laid down: 12 June 1942
- Launched: 15 June 1943
- Commissioned: 12 December 1943
- Identification: Pennant number G46
- Fate: Sunk by mine on 24 June 1944

General characteristics
- Class & type: S-class destroyer
- Displacement: 1,710 tons
- Length: 362 ft 9 in (110.57 m)
- Beam: 35 ft 9 in (10.90 m)
- Draught: 10 ft 0 in (3.05 m)
- Installed power: 40,000 shp
- Propulsion: twin screws; steam turbines

HMS Swift was an S-class destroyer built for the Royal Navy in the Second World War. The ship belonged to the January 1941 order of the Royal Navy from the War Emergency program. The destroyer was launched from the shipyard J. Samuel White in Cowes on 15 June 1943 and was put into service on 12 December 1943.

In early 1944 Swift saw service escorting Arctic Convoys to and from the Kola Inlet. The ship participated in the Normandy landings providing fire support. She was sunk off Sword Beach by mine on 24 June 1944 with 53 casualties.

== Design ==
Swift was one of eight S-class destroyers ordered as the 5th Emergency Flotilla on 9 January 1941. The S-class were War Emergency Programme destroyers, intended for general duties, including use as anti-submarine escort, and were to be suitable for mass-production. They were based on the hull and machinery of the pre-war J-class destroyers, but with a lighter armament (effectively whatever armament was available) in order to speed production.

The S-class were 362 feet 9 inches (110.57 m) long overall, 348 feet 0 inches (106.07 m) at the waterline and 339 feet 6 inches (103.48 m) between perpendiculars, with a beam of 35 feet 8 inches (10.87 m) and a draught of 10 feet 0 inches (3.05 m) mean and 14 feet 3 inches (4.34 m) full load. Displacement was 1,710 long tons (1,740 t) standard and 2,530 long tons (2,570 t) full load. Two Admiralty 3-drum water-tube boilers supplied steam at 300 pounds per square inch (2,100 kPa) and 630 °F (332 °C) to two sets of Parsons single-reduction geared steam turbines, which drove two propeller shafts. The machinery was rated at 40,000 shaft horsepower (30,000 kW) giving a maximum speed of 36 knots (41 mph; 67 km/h) and 32 knots (37 mph; 59 km/h) at full load. 615 tons of oil were carried, giving a range of 4,675 nautical miles (5,380 mi; 8,658 km) at 20 knots (23 mph; 37 km/h).

The ship had a main gun armament of four 4.7 inch (120 mm) QF Mk. IX guns on single mountings, capable of elevating to an angle of 55 degrees rather than the 40 degree of previous War Emergency destroyers, giving improved anti-aircraft capability. The close-in anti-aircraft armament was one Hazemayer stabilised twin mount for the Bofors 40 mm gun and four twin Oerlikon 20 mm cannons. Two quadruple mounts for 21 inch (533 mm) torpedoes were fitted, while the ship had a depth charge outfit of four depth charge mortars and two racks, with a total of 70 charges carried.

Swift was fitted with a Type 272 surface warning radar and a high-frequency direction finding (HF/DF) aerial on the ship's tripod foremast, with a Type 291 air warning radar on a pole mast aft and Type 285 fire control radar integrated with the ship's high-angle gun director. She had a crew of 170 officers and other ranks.

== Construction and service ==
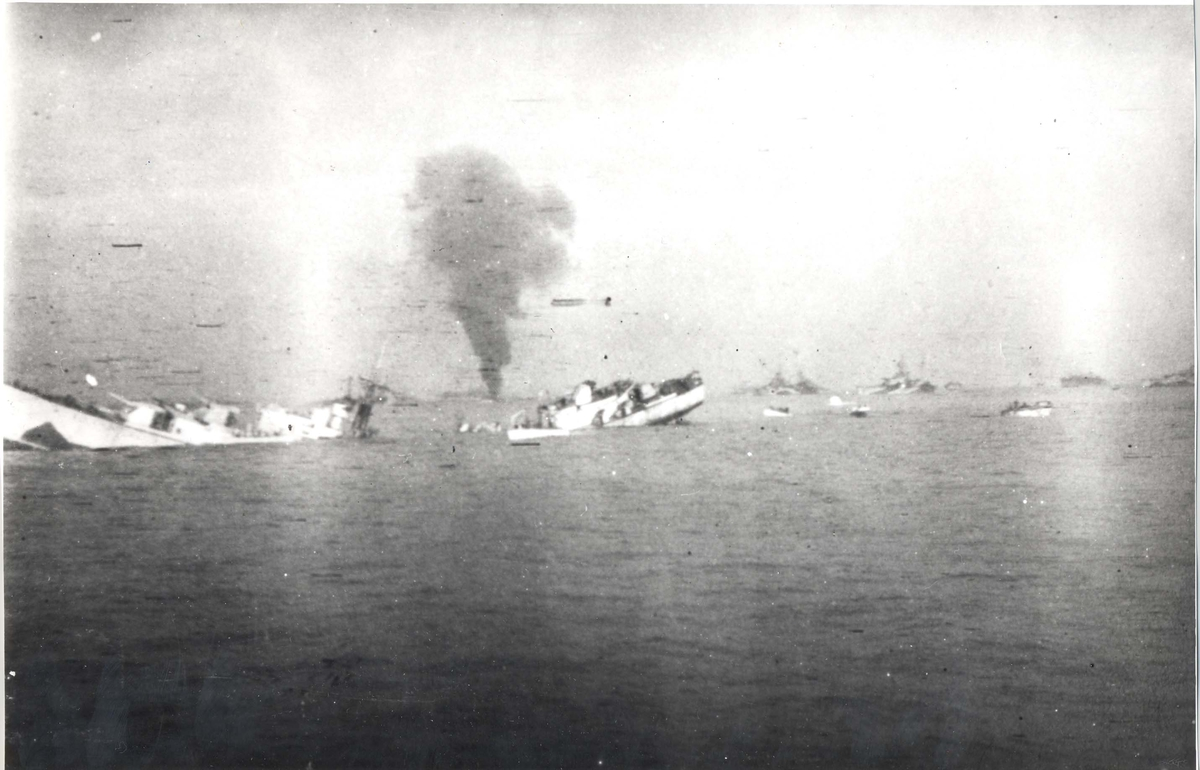
Swift sinking on 24 June.

Swift was laid down at J. Samuel White's Cowes, Isle of Wight shipyard on 12 June 1942 and was launched on 15 June 1943. She was completed on 6 December 1943, and assigned the Pennant number G46.

Following commissioning and workup, Swift, like the other S-class destroyers, joined the 23rd Destroyer Flotilla of the British Home Fleet.
