= HNoMS Svenner =

At least two ships of the Royal Norwegian Navy have been named HNoMS Svenner, after the island of Svenner:

- HNoMS Svenner (G03), an S-class destroyer acquired from the Royal Navy in 1944 and also sunk in 1944.
- HNoMS Svenner (S309), a Kobben-class submarine commissioned in 1967 and transferred to Poland in 2003.
