= Type 16 frigate =

1951 class of frigates of the Royal Navy

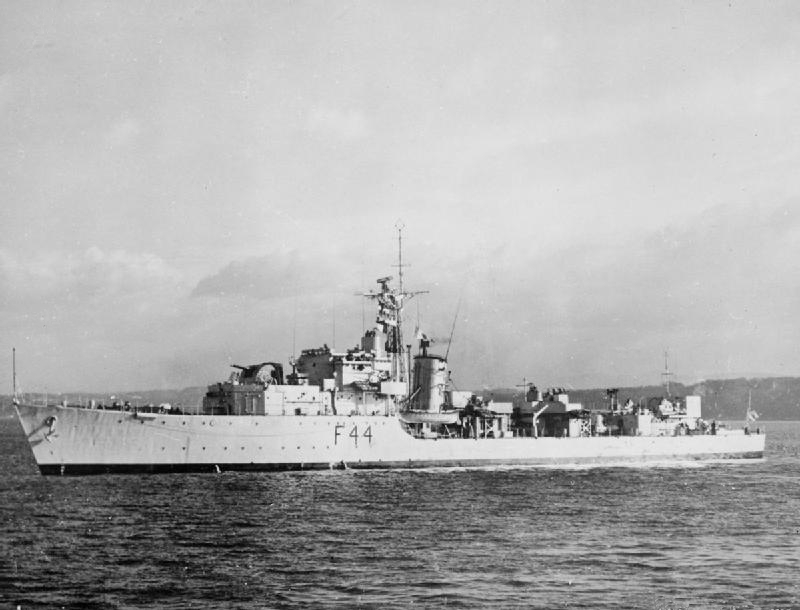
- Type 16 frigate HMS Tenacious (F44)

Class overview
- Operators: Royal Navy; Pakistan Navy
- Built: 1949–1954
- In commission: 1951–1967
- Completed: 10

General characteristics for T-class conversion
- Type: Anti-submarine Frigate
- Displacement: 1,800 long tons (1,800 t) standard; 2,300 long tons (2,300 t) full load
- Length: 362 ft 9 in (110.57 m) o/a
- Beam: 37 ft 9 in (11.51 m)
- Draught: 14 ft 6 in (4.42 m)
- Propulsion: 2 × Admiralty 3-drum boilers; Steam turbines, 40,000 shp; 2 shafts
- Speed: 32 knots (37 mph; 59 km/h) full load
- Complement: 175
- Sensors & processing systems: Type 293Q target indication Radar; Type 974 navigation Radar; Type 1010 Cossor Mark 10 IFF; Type 146B search Sonar; Type 147 depth finder Sonar; Type 162 target classification Sonar; Type 174 attack Sonar
- Armament: 1 × twin 4-inch (102 mm) gun Mark 19; 1 × twin 40 mm Bofors gun Mk.5; 5 × single 40 mm Bofors gun Mk.9; 2 × Squid A/S mortar; 1 × quad 21 in (533 mm) tubes for Mk.9 torpedoes

The Type 16 frigates were a class of British anti-submarine frigates of the Royal Navy. They were based on the hulls of World War II-era destroyers that had been rendered obsolete by rapid advances in technology. They were similar in concept to the Type 15 frigate, but were a far more limited design rendered necessary by budget constraints.

== History ==
At the start of the Cold War, the Royal Navy was in urgent need of fast escort ships to counter the large number of Whiskey-class submarines being built by the Soviet Union, which were faster than the Royal Navy's existing sloops and frigates. Britain had large numbers of War Emergency Programme destroyers, which while relatively new, were poorly equipped for modern fleet purposes, with poor anti-aircraft armament and fire control. It was therefore decided to convert the Emergency Programme destroyers to interim escorts to meet the Royal Navy's requirements until new-build ships (which eventually became the Type 12 and Type 14 frigates) could be designed and built. The initial design was the Type 15 frigate or Rapid class, which was a major rebuild of the ships, with an extended forecastle and new superstructure giving improved accommodation and complete replacement of the ships' armament and sensors. At one time, it was planned to convert 57 destroyers to the Type 15 standard, but the cost of such a large programme proved prohibitive, with only 23 ships becoming Type 15 frigates. Instead, a simpler and cheaper conversion, the Type 16 was ordered.

The Type 16 conversion removed the existing gun armament, substituting a twin 4 inch gun forward with a close-in anti-aircraft armament of seven Bofors 40 mm guns, with simpler fire control than used in the Type 15. Anti-submarine armament consisted of two Squid anti-submarine mortars, while a quadruple set of 21-inch (533 mm) torpedo tubes provided a limited anti-surface ship armament.

== Ships ==
Name	Pennant	Built by	Laid down	Launched	Completed	Converted by	Fate
O and P-class conversion
Orwell	F98	Thornycroft, Woolston	16 May 1940	2 April 1942	7 October 1942	Royal Dockyard, Rosyth, 1952	Broken up, 1965
Paladin	F169	J Brown, Clydebank	22 July 1940	11 June 1941	12 December 1941	Royal Dockyard, Rosyth, 1954	Broken up, 1962
Petard	F56	Vickers Armstrong, Tyne	26 December 1939	27 March 1941	14 June 1942	Harland & Wolff, Belfast, 1953–1955	Broken up, 1967
T-class conversion
Teazer	F23	Cammell Laird	20 October 1940	7 January 1943	13 September 1943	Mountstart Dry Docks, Cardiff, 1953–1954	Broken up, 1965
Tenacious	F44	Cammell Laird	3 December 1941	24 March 1943	30 October 1943	Royal Dockyard, Rosyth, 1951–1952	Broken up, 1965
Termagant	F189	Denny, Dumbarton	25 November 1941	22 March 1943	30 October 1943	Grayson Rollo, Birkenhead, 1952–1953	Broken up, 1965
Terpsichore	F19	Denny, Dumbarton	25 November 1941	17 June 1943	20 January 1944	J. I. Thornycroft, Woolston, Hampshire, 1953–1954	Broken up, 1966
Tumult	F121	J Brown, Clydebank	16 November 1941	9 November 1941	2 April 1943	Grayson Rollo, Birkenhead, 1949–1950	Broken up, 1965
Tuscan	F156	Swan Hunter, Wallsend	9 September 1941	28 May 1942	11 March 1943	Mountstart Dry Docks, Cardiff, 1949–1950	Broken up, 1966
Tyrian	F67	Swan Hunter, Wallsend	15 October 1941	27 July 1942	8 April 1943	Harland & Wolff, Liverpool & Gordon Alison, Birkenhead, 1951–1953	Broken up, 1965

Ex-O class destroyers of the Pakistan Navy Onslow / Tippu Sultan and Onslaught / Tughril were returned to the UK between 1957 and 1959 to be converted along the lines of the Type 16 frigate.

Also two ex-W class destroyers of the South African Navy: SAS Jan van Riebeeck (ex-Wessex) and SAS Simon van der Stel (ex-Whelp) underwent conversions to modified Type 16 frigates in 1962–66. They differed mainly in ability to carry two Westland Wasp helicopters, instead of having a Squid launcher.

== See also ==
- War Emergency Programme destroyers: The destroyer building programme that the Type 16 frigates were converted from
- Type 15 frigate a more extensive conversion of destroyer hulls than the Type 16

== Publications ==
- Colledge, J. J.; Warlow, Ben (2006) [1969]. Ships of the Royal Navy: The Complete Record of All Fighting Ships of the Royal Navy from the 15th Century to the Present (3rd Rev ed.). London: Chatham Publishing. ISBN 978-1-86176-281-8. OCLC 67375475.
- Friedman, Norman. British Destroyers & Frigates: The Second World War and After. London: Chatham Publishing, 2006. ISBN 978-1-86176-137-8.
- Gardiner, Robert and Stephen Chumbley. Conway's All The World's Fighting Ships 1947–1995. Annapolis, Maryland, USA: Naval Institute Press, 1995. ISBN 1-55750-132-7.
- Marriott, Leo. Royal Navy Frigates 1945-1983 Ian Allan, 1983, ISBN 0-7110-1322-5
