= HMS Tuscan (R56) =

T-class destroyer converted to Type 16 frigate of the Royal Navy

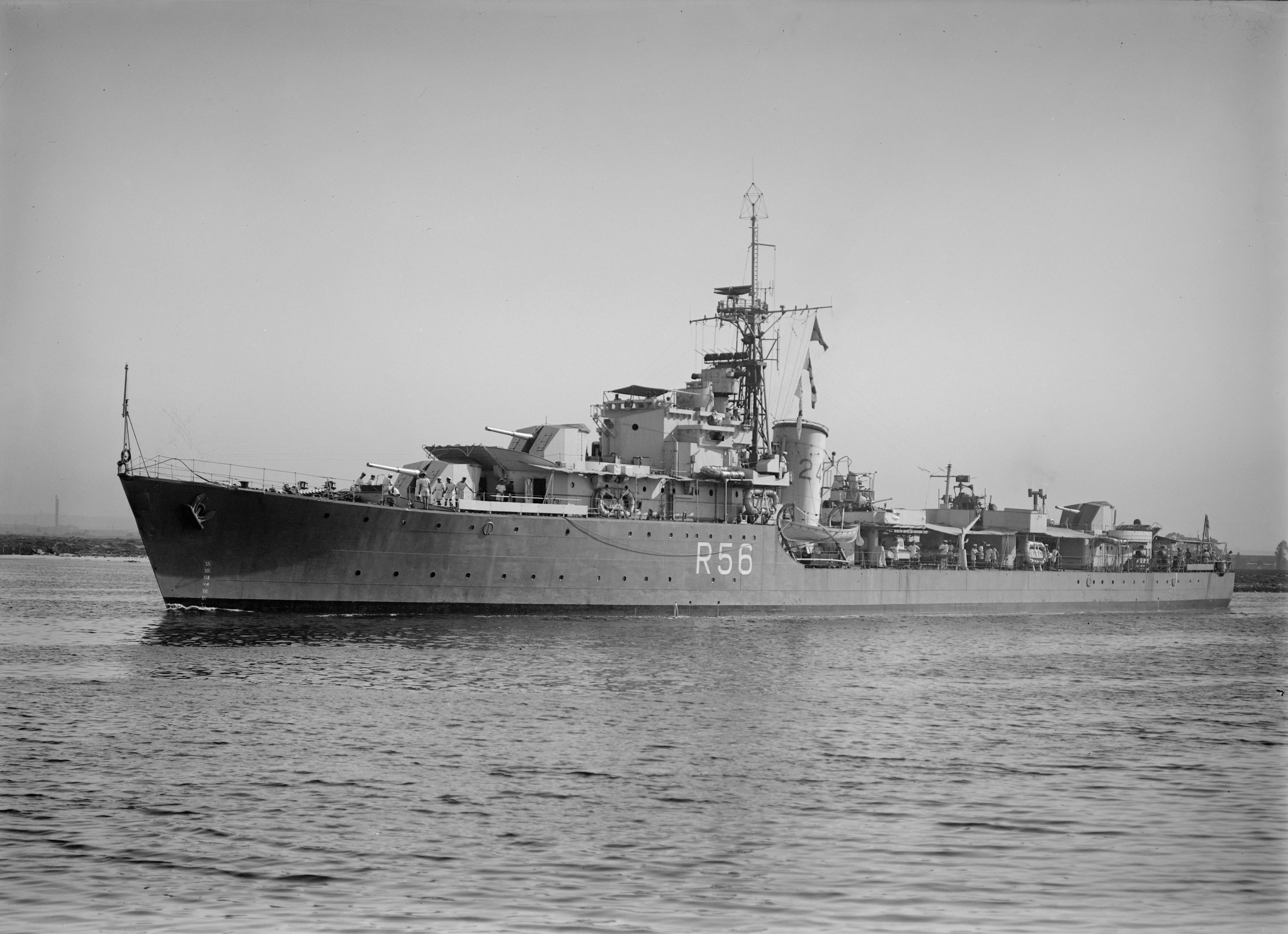
- HMS Tuscan in 1946

History

United Kingdom
- Name: HMS Tuscan
- Ordered: 14 March 1941
- Builder: Swan Hunter
- Laid down: 6 September 1941
- Launched: 28 May 1942
- Commissioned: 11 March 1943
- Reclassified: Converted to Type 16 frigate 1952
- Identification: Pennant number R56/F156
- Motto: I hold what I take
- Fate: Scrapped 26 May 1966

General characteristics as T–class
- Class & type: T-class destroyer
- Displacement: 1,710 long tons (1,737 t) - 1,730 long tons (1,758 t) (standard nominal); 1,780 long tons (1,809 t) - 1,810 long tons (1,839 t) (actual); 2,505 long tons (2,545 t) - 2,545 long tons (2,586 t) (deep load)
- Length: 339 ft 6 in (103.48 m) pp; 362 ft 9 in (110.57 m) oa
- Beam: 35 ft 8 in (10.87 m)
- Draught: 14 ft 2 in (4.32 m)
- Propulsion: 2 shaft Parsons geared turbines; 2 Admiralty 3-drum boilers; 40,000 shp (30,000 kW)
- Speed: 36.75 knots (42.29 mph; 68.06 km/h)
- Complement: 180-225
- Armament: 4 × 4.7-inch (120-mm) QF Mk IX guns (4×1); 2 × 40mm Bofors (1x2); 8 × 20 mm guns anti-aircraft guns; 8 × 21-inch (533 mm) torpedo tubes (2×4)

General characteristics as Type 16
- Class & type: Type 16 frigate
- Displacement: 1,800 long tons (1,800 t) standard; 2,300 long tons (2,300 t) full load
- Length: 362 ft 9 in (110.57 m) o/a
- Beam: 37 ft 9 in (11.51 m)
- Draught: 14 ft 6 in (4.42 m)
- Propulsion: 2 × Admiralty 3-drum boilers; Steam turbines, 40,000 shp; 2 shafts
- Speed: 32 knots (37 mph; 59 km/h) full load
- Complement: 175
- Sensors & processing systems: Type 293Q target indication Radar; Type 974 navigation Radar; Type 1010 Cossor Mark 10 IFF; Type 146B search Sonar; Type 147 depth finder Sonar; Type 162 target classification Sonar; Type 174 attack Sonar
- Armament: 1 × twin 4 in gun Mark 19; 1 × twin 40 mm Bofors gun Mk.5; 5 × single 40 mm Bofors gun Mk.9; 2 × Squid A/S mortar; 1 × quad 21 in (533 mm) tubes for Mk.9 torpedoes

HMS Tuscan was a T-class destroyer of the British Royal Navy that served during the Second World War and was scrapped in 1966.

== Second World War service ==
On 7 October 1944, she and the destroyer Termagant sank the German torpedo boat TA37, the subchaser UJ210 and the harbour patrol boat GK32.

== Post-war service ==
Between 1946 and 1952, Tuscan was held as part of the reserve fleet in Portsmouth. In 1949 and 1950, she had a refit at Cammell Laird in Birkenhead. Between May 1952 and September 1953, she was converted into a Type 16 fast anti-submarine frigate by Mount Stuart Dry Docks, Cardiff and was allocated the new pennant number F156.

In 1953, she was held as part of the Devonport Reserve, and in 1954 the Portsmouth Reserve. In 1960, she was part of the Chatham reserve and between 1961 and 1963 was part of the Portsmouth Operational Reserve. She was eventually sold to McLellan for scrap and arrived at Bo'ness for breaking up on 26 March 1966.

== Publications ==
- Colledge, J. J.; Warlow, Ben (2006) [1969]. Ships of the Royal Navy: The Complete Record of All Fighting Ships of the Royal Navy from the 15th Century to the Present (3rd Rev ed.). London: Chatham Publishing. ISBN 978-1-86176-281-8. OCLC 67375475.
- Raven, Alan; Roberts, John (1978). War Built Destroyers O to Z Classes. London: Bivouac Books. ISBN 0-85680-010-4.
- Rohwer, Jürgen; Hümmelchen, Gerhard (1992). Chronology of the War at Sea 1939–1945. London: Greenhill Books. ISBN 1-85367-117-7.
- Whitley, M. J. (1988). Destroyers of World War 2. Annapolis, Maryland: Naval Institute Press. ISBN 0-87021-326-1.
- "Italian torpedo boat class Ariete". Warshipsww2. Archived from the original on 11 October 2014.
