= HMS Serapis (G94) =

S-class destroyer, British Royal Navy (1943)

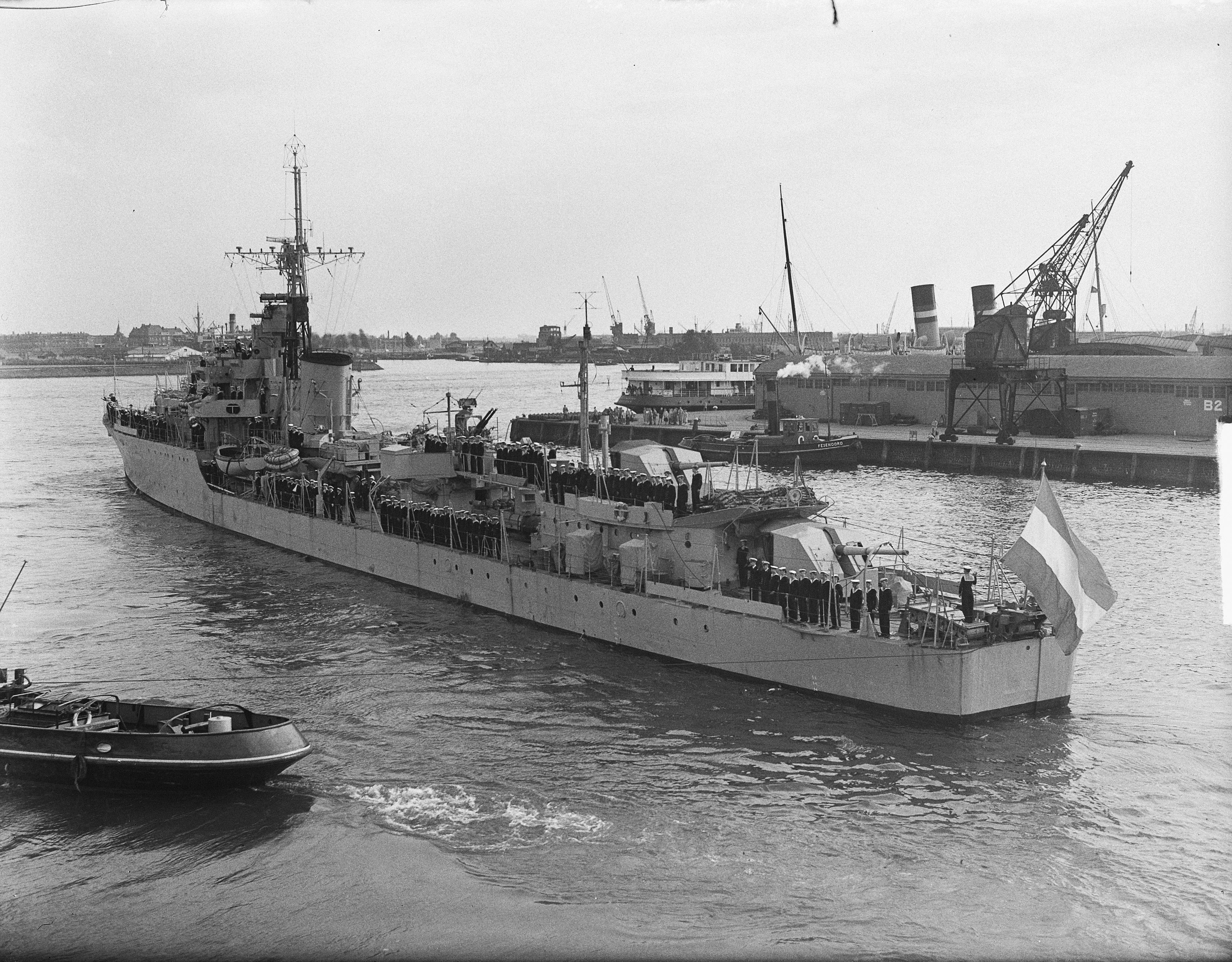
- Piet Hein in 1950

History

United Kingdom
- Name: HMS Serapis
- Ordered: 9 January 1941
- Builder: Scotts, Greenock
- Laid down: 14 August 1941
- Launched: 25 March 1943
- Commissioned: 23 December 1943
- Identification: Pennant number: G94
- Fate: To Netherlands 5 October 1945

Netherlands
- Name: HNLMS Piet Hein
- Commissioned: 5 October 1945
- Identification: Pennant number DD 805
- Fate: Sold for scrap 1962

General characteristics
- Class & type: S-class destroyer
- Displacement: 1,710 long tons (1,737 t) (standard)
- Length: 362 ft 9 in (110.57 m) oa
- Beam: 35 ft 8 in (10.87 m)
- Draught: 14 ft 0 in (4.27 m)
- Propulsion: 2 shaft Parsons geared turbines; 2 Admiralty 3-drum boilers; 40,000 shp (30,000 kW)
- Speed: 36 knots (41 mph; 67 km/h)
- Complement: 180
- Armament: 4 × 4.7-inch (120 mm) QF Mk IX guns (4×1); 2 × 40 mm Bofors (1x2); 8 × 20 mm guns anti-aircraft guns; 8 × 21-inch (533 mm) torpedo tubes (2×4)

HMS Serapis was an S-class destroyer of the British Royal Navy. The ship was built by Scotts Shipbuilding and Engineering Company from 1941 to 1943, and was launched on 25 March 1943 and completed on 25 December 1943.

Serapis operated with the Home Fleet during the Second World War, escorting Arctic Convoys and taking part in the Invasion of Normandy in 1944. After the end of the war, the ship was sold to The Netherlands, being renamed HNLMS Piet Hein. Piet Hein served in Indonesian War of Independence and the Korean War. She was sold for scrap in 1962.

== Design and construction ==
The British Admiralty ordered the eight destroyers of the S class on 9 January 1941 as the 5th Emergency Flotilla. The S class were War Emergency Programme destroyers, intended for general duties, including use as anti-submarine escort, and were to be suitable for mass-production. They were based on the hull and machinery of the pre-war J-class destroyers, but with a lighter armament (effectively whatever armament was available) in order to speed production.

The S class were 362 feet 9 inches (110.57 m) long overall, 348 feet 0 inches (106.07 m) at the waterline and 339 feet 6 inches (103.48 m) between perpendiculars, with a beam of 35 feet 8 inches (10.87 m) and a draught of 10 feet 0 inches (3.05 m) mean and 14 feet 3 inches (4.34 m) full load. Displacement was 1,710 long tons (1,740 t) standard and 2,530 long tons (2,570 t) full load. Two Admiralty 3-drum water-tube boilers supplied steam at 300 pounds per square inch (2,100 kPa) and 630 °F (332 °C) to two sets of Parsons single-reduction geared steam turbines, which drove two propeller shafts. The machinery was rated at 40,000 shaft horsepower (30,000 kW) giving a maximum speed of 36 knots (41 mph; 67 km/h) and 32 knots (37 mph; 59 km/h) at full load. 615 tons of oil were carried, giving a range of 4,675 nautical miles (5,380 mi; 8,658 km) at 20 knots (23 mph; 37 km/h).

The ship had a main gun armament of four 4.7-inch (120 mm) QF Mk. IX guns, capable of elevating to an angle of 55 degrees, giving a degree of anti-aircraft capability. The close-in anti-aircraft armament was one Hazemayer stabilised twin mount for the Bofors 40 mm gun and eight Oerlikon 20 mm cannons (four twin mounts). Two quadruple mounts for 21-inch (533 mm) torpedoes were fitted, while the ship had a depth charge outfit of four depth charge mortars and two racks, with a total of 70 charges carried.

Serapis was fitted with a Type 272 surface warning radar and a high-frequency direction finding (HF/DF) aerial on the ship's lattice foremast, together with a Type 291 air warning radar on a pole mast aft. A Type 285 fire control radar integrated with the ship's high-angle gun director, while the Hazemayer mount had an integrated Type 282 radar. She had a crew of 179 officers and other ranks.

Serapis was laid down at Scotts', Greenock shipyard on 14 August 1941 and was launched on 25 March 1943. She was completed on 23 December 1943, and assigned the pennant number G94.

== Service ==
=== Royal Navy ===
After commissioning and workup, Serapis joined the 23rd Destroyer Flotilla of the Home Fleet based at Scapa Flow. On 22 February 1944, Serapis joined the ocean escort for the Arctic Convoy JW 57, remaining with it until arriving at the Kola Inlet on 28 February and also escorted the return convoy RA 57 from Russia to Loch Ewe. On 29 March, Serapis joined the next Russia bound convoy, JW 58, escorting it until 4 April and the return convoy RA 58 from 29 March until 4 April.

In June 1944, Serapis, along with the rest of the 23rd Flotilla, took part in the Allied Invasion of France, supporting landings on Sword Beach on 6 June, and continuing to provide gunfire support for the fighting on land and carry out escort operations until August. After Normandy duties ended, Serapis returned to the Home Fleet, escorting the aircraft carriers Fencer and Trumpeter as their aircraft carried out anti-shipping strikes and minelaying operations off the coast of Norway on 14–15 October and the carriers Trumpeter and Campania for more air strikes and minelaying operations off Norway on 24 October. From 2 November to 6 November, Serapis formed part of the escort for Convoy JW 61A, which consisted of two troopships, Scythia and Empress of Australia, carrying 11,000 Soviet citizens who had been captured in Normandy while fighting for the German Army, and from 11 to 16 November escorted the two troopships on their return journey as Convoy RA 61A.

From 7–12 December 1944, Serapis took part in Operation Urbane, a minelaying and anti-shipping survey by the carriers Implacable, Premier and Trumpeter. From 1 January to 8 January 1945, Serapis escorted Convoy JW 63 to the Kola Inlet, and from 11 to 21 January, the return Convoy RA 63 back to Loch Ewe. Serapis formed part of the ocean escort for Arctic Convoy JW 64 from 6 to 15 February and the return convoy RA 64 from 17 to 28 February, her last Arctic Convoy. Carrier sweeps against Norwegian coastal waters continued, with Serapis taking part in Operation Cupola (escorting Searcher, Premier and Queen) from 19 to 21 March and Operations Muscular and Prefix (escorting Searcher, Puncher, Queen and Nairana) from 24 to 29 March 1945. From 31 March to 17 June 1945, Serapis was refitted at Immingham and then returned to the Home Fleet, carrying out occupation duties at Wilhelmshaven in July.

=== Royal Netherlands Navy ===
In September 1945, the Netherlands agreed to purchase four British destroyers to help to re-equip the Royal Netherlands Navy, the three S-class destroyers Serapis, Scorpion and Scourge and the Q-class destroyer Quilliam. Serapis was commissioned into Netherlands service on 5 October 1945, with the new name Piet Hein. She left Sheerness on 28 October on passage for Batavia in the Dutch East Indies via the Mediterranean and Ceylon. She took part in the Indonesian War of Independence, as the Dutch attempted to regain control of the East Indies from the Indonesian nationalists, and this led to Australian dock workers refusing to carry out repairs on Piet Hein in June 1946. Piet Hein also took part in the Korean War in 1952, and on 17 July 1952, together with the American destroyers USS Orleck and USS Endicott, captured two Sampans and 10 prisoners. Piet Hein was also credited with destroying a North Korean train during the war.

On 12 August 1954, Piet Hein along with the destroyers Marnix and Evertsen, escorted the Norwegian Royal Yacht Norge, carrying King Haakon VII of Norway on a Royal Visit to the Netherlands, to Ijmuiden. Piet Hein had her anti-aircraft armament modified in 1956–57, becoming six Bofors 40 mm guns. She was converted to a fast frigate from 1957 to 1958, with a helicopter pad being fitted aft of the ship's funnel, with the ship's armament unchanged. Piet Hein recommissioned on 1 July 1958, but was sold for scrap in 1962, being broken up at Ghent from 30 May 1962.

== Bibliography ==
- Blackman, Raymond V. B., ed. (1953). Jane's Fighting Ships 1953–54. New York: McGraw-Hill Book Company Inc.
- Blackman, Raymond V. B., ed. (1960). Jane's Fighting Ships 1960–61. London: Sampson Low, Marston & Co., Ltd.
- English, John (2008). Obdurate to Daring: British Fleet Destroyers 1941–45. Windsor, UK: World Ship Society. ISBN 978-0-9560769-0-8.
- Friedman, Norman (2008). British Destroyers & Frigates: The Second World War and After. Barnsley, UK: Seaforth Publishing. ISBN 978-1-84832-015-4.
- Gardiner, Robert; Chesneau, Roger, eds. (1980). Conway's All The World's Fighting Ships 1922–1946. London: Conway Maritime Press. ISBN 0-85177-146-7.
- Gardiner, Robert; Chumbley, Stephen, eds. (1995). Conway's All The World's Fighting Ships 1947–1995. Annapolis, Maryland, USA: Naval Institute Press. ISBN 1-55750-132-7.
- Lenton, H. T. (1970). Navies of the Second World War: British Fleet & Escort Destroyers Volume Two. London: Macdonald & Co. ISBN 0-356-03122-5.
- Rohwer, Jürgen; Hümmelchen, Gerhard (1992). Chronology of the War at Sea 1939–1945. London: Greenhill Books. ISBN 1-85367-117-7.
- Ruegg, Bob; Hague, Arnold (1993). Convoys to Russia 1941–1945. Kendal, UK: World Ship Society. ISBN 0-905617-66-5.
- The Sea Services in the Korean War: 1950–1953 (PDF). Annapolis, Maryland, USA: US Naval Institute. 2000 – via United States Marine Corps.
- Whitley, M. J. (2000). Destroyers of World War 2: An International Encyclopedia. London: Cassell & Co. ISBN 1-85409-521-8.
- Winser, John de S. (1994). The D-Day Ships: Neptune: the Greatest Amphibious Operation in History. Kendal, UK: World Ship Society. ISBN 0-905617-75-4.
