= S and T-class destroyer =

Class of Royal Navy destroyers

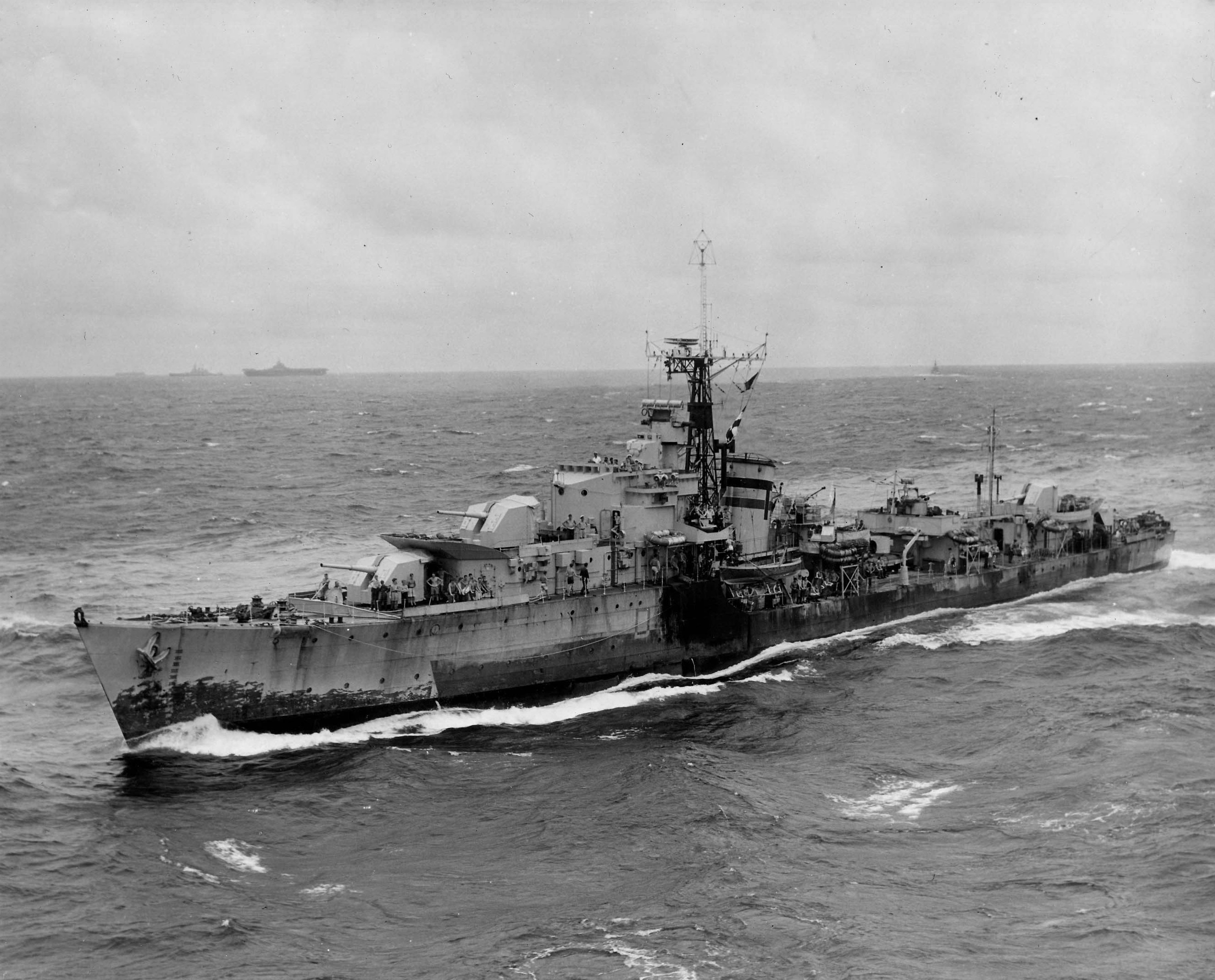
- HMS Terpsichore in 1945

Class overview
- Name: S and T class
- Builders: Hawthorn Leslie and Company; John Brown & Company; Cammell Laird; William Denny and Brothers; Scotts Shipbuilding and Engineering Company; J. Samuel White; Swan Hunter
- Operators: Royal Navy; Royal Netherlands Navy; Royal Norwegian Navy
- Preceded by: Q and R class
- Succeeded by: U and V class
- Subclasses: S, T
- Completed: 16
- Lost: 2
- Retired: 14

General characteristics
- Type: Destroyer
- Displacement: 1,710 long tons (1,737 t) - 1,730 long tons (1,758 t) (standard nominal); 1,780 long tons (1,809 t) - 1,810 long tons (1,839 t) (actual); 2,505 long tons (2,545 t) - 2,545 long tons (2,586 t) (deep load)
- Length: 339 ft 6 in (103.48 m) pp; 362 ft 9 in (110.57 m) oa
- Beam: 35 ft 8 in (10.87 m)
- Draught: 14 ft 2 in (4.32 m)
- Propulsion: 2 shaft Parsons geared turbines; 2 Admiralty 3-drum boilers; 40,000 shp (30,000 kW)
- Speed: 36.75 knots (42.29 mph; 68.06 km/h)
- Complement: 180-225
- Armament: 4 × 4.7-inch (120-mm) QF Mk IX guns (4×1); 2 × 40mm Bofors (1x2); 8 × QF 20 mm Oerlikon anti-aircraft guns; 8 × 21-inch (533 mm) torpedo tubes (2×4)

The S and T class was a class of sixteen destroyers of the Royal Navy launched in 1942–1943. They were built as two flotillas, known as the 5th and 6th Emergency Flotilla, and they served as fleet and convoy escorts in World War II.

== Design features ==
The S class introduced the CP (central pivot) Mark XXII mounting for the QF Mark IX 4.7 in guns. This new mounting had a shield with a sharply raked front, to allow increased elevation (to 55 degrees), contrasting noticeably with the vertical front of the previous CP Mark XVIII, and easily differentiated the S class onwards from their immediate predecessors. Savage was the exception in this respect, being fitted with four 4.5 in guns; a twin mounting forward and two singles aft. These ships used the Fuze Keeping Clock HA Fire Control Computer.

The quadruple mounting Mark VII for the QF 2-pounder pom-poms was replaced by the twin mounting Mark IV for the 40 mm Bofors gun. Known as the "Hazemeyer" (or "Haslemere"), this advanced mounting was tri-axially stabilised in order that a target could be kept in the sights on the pitching deck of a destroyer and was fitted with an analog fire control computer and Radar Type 282, a metric range-finding set. The Hazemeyer design had been brought to Britain by the Dutch minelayer Willem van der Zaan that had escaped from the German occupation in May 1940.

The T class also was the first class to replace pole or tripod foremasts with lattice masts, which continued in subsequent War Emergency Flotillas.

== Ships in class ==
Plan of HMS Scourge

=== S class ===
- Saumarez
- Savage
- Scorpion (to Royal Dutch Navy as HNLMS Kortenaar, 1945)
- Scourge (to Royal Dutch Navy as HNLMS Evertsen, 1946)
- Serapis (to Royal Dutch Navy as HNLMS Piet Hein, 1945)
- Shark (to Norway as Svenner) (lost on 6 June 1944)
- Success (to Norway as Stord)
- Swift (lost on 24 June 1944)

=== T class ===
- Teazer
- Tenacious
- Termagant
- Terpsichore
- Troubridge
- Tumult
- Tuscan
- Tyrian

== Ships ==
=== S class ===
Construction data
Name	Pennant number	Builder, Yard	Laid down	Launched	Commissioned	Fate
Saumarez (Note: flotilla leader)	G12	Hawthorn Leslie, Hebburn	6 January 1941	20 November 1942	1 July 1943	Broken up in Charlestown, Fife in October 1950.
Savage	G20	Hawthorn Leslie, Hebburn	7 December 1941	24 September 1942	8 June 1943	Broken up in Newport on 11 April 1962.
Scorpion	G72	Cammell Laird, Birkenhead	19 June 1941	26 August 1942	11 May 1943	Sold to the Dutch in October 1945
Scourge	G01	Cammell Laird, Birkenhead	26 June 1941	8 December 1942	14 July 1943	Sold to the Dutch in October 1945
Serapis	G94	Scotts, Greenock	14 August 1941	25 March 1943	23 December 1943	To Netherlands 5 October 1945
Shark	G03	Scotts, Greenock	5 November 1941	1 June 1943	11 March 1944	Transferred to Norway, sunk off Sword Beach 6 June 1944.
Success	G26	J.Samuel White, Cowes	25 February 1942	3 March 1943	26 August 1943	Transferred to Norway prior to completion as HNoMS Stord. Sold for scrapping 1959
Swift	G46	J.Samuel White, Cowes	12 June 1942	15 June 1943	12 December 1943	Sunk by mine 24 June 1944

=== T class ===
Construction data
Name	Pennant number	Builder	Laid down	Launched	Commissioned	Fate
Teazer	R23	Cammall Laird, Birkenhead	20 October 1941	7 January 1943	13 September 1943	Scrapped Dalmuir 7 August 1965
Tenacious	G45	Cammall Laird, Birkenhead	3 December 1941	24 March 1943	30 October 1943	Scrapped Troon 29 June 1965.
Termagant	R89	William Denny, Dumbarton	25 November 1941	22 March 1943	8 October 1943	Scrapped Dalmuir 5 November 1965
Terpsichore	R33	William Denny, Dumbarton	25 November 1941	17 June 1943	20 January 1944	Scrapped at Troon May 1966
Troubridge (Note: flotilla leader)	R00	John Brown & Co., Clydebank	10 November 1941	23 September 1942	8 March 1943	Broken up Newport 5 May 1970.
Tumult	R11	John Brown & Co., Clydebank	16 November 1941	9 November 1942	2 April 1943	Scrapped Dalmuir 24 October 1965.
Tuscan	R56	Swan Hunter, Wallsend	6 September 1941	28 May 1942	11 March 1943	Scrapped Bo’ness 26 May 1966
Tyrian	R67	Swan Hunter, Wallsend	15 October 1941	27 July 1942	8 April 1943	Scrapped Troon 9 March 1965

== See also ==
- Type 15 frigate: postwar full conversion of Wartime Emergency Programme destroyers into first-rate fast anti-submarine frigates
- Type 16 frigate: postwar partial conversion of Wartime Emergency Programme destroyers into second-rate fast anti-submarine frigates

== Publications ==
- Cocker, Maurice (1981). Destroyers of the Royal Navy, 1893–1981. Littlehampton Book Services. ISBN 0-7110-1075-7.
- Colledge, J. J.; Warlow, Ben (2006) [1969]. Ships of the Royal Navy: The Complete Record of All Fighting Ships of the Royal Navy from the 15th Century to the Present (3rd Rev ed.). London: Chatham Publishing. ISBN 978-1-86176-281-8. OCLC 67375475.
- Robert Gardiner, ed. (1980). Conway's All the World's Fighting Ships 1922-1946. Naval Institute Press. ISBN 0-87021-913-8.
- Marriott, Leo (1994). Royal Navy Destroyers since 1945. Ian Allan. ISBN 0-7110-1817-0.
- Raven, Alan; Roberts, John (1978). War Built Destroyers O to Z Classes. London: Bivouac Books. ISBN 0-85680-010-4.
- Whitley, M. J. (1988). Destroyers of World War 2. Annapolis, Maryland: Naval Institute Press. ISBN 0-87021-326-1.
