= Grayson Rollo and Clover Docks =

Shipyard in Birkenhead, Wirral, England

The Grayson Rollo and Clover shipyard was a ship repair and dry dock facility based at Birkenhead, on the Wirral Peninsula, England. It was situated on the River Mersey between the former Cammell Laird yard and Woodside Ferry.

During the Second World War they had offices and a workshop at Wapping, Liverpool Dock Road.

By the 1970s, the site had become known as Western Ship Repairers Limited before closing altogether in the early 1980s, with the workshops subsequently demolished and the graving docks filled in. Only the indentations on the river wall remain to show their original location.

Part of the area was redeveloped ten years later with a mixture of residential apartments, offices and small business units. A pedestrian promenade walkway has been built linking Woodside with Monks Ferry.
