= HMS Tenacious (R45) =

T-class destroyer converted to Type 16 frigate of the Royal Navy

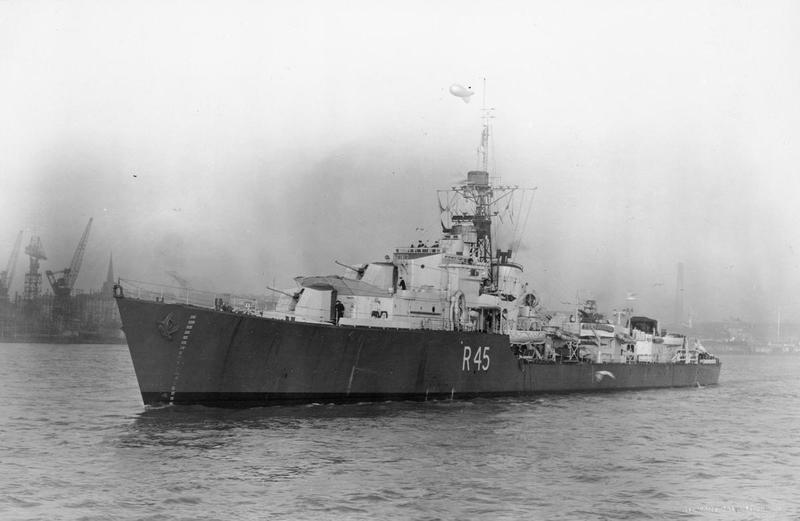
- HMS Tenacious underway on the River Mersey, c1943 (IWM)

History

United Kingdom
- Name: HMS Tenacious
- Ordered: March 1941
- Builder: Cammell Laird, Birkenhead
- Laid down: 3 December 1941
- Launched: 24 March 1943
- Commissioned: 30 October 1943
- Renamed: Ordered as HMS Tempest, renamed before being launched
- Identification: Pennant number: R45 (later F44)
- Honours and awards: Adriatic 1944; South France 1944; Mediterranean 1944; Okinawa 1945
- Fate: Arrived for scrapping in June 1965
- Badge: On a field White a bulldog's face proper.

General characteristics as T–class
- Class & type: T-class destroyer
- Displacement: 1,710 long tons (1,737 t) – 1,730 long tons (1,758 t) (standard nominal); 1,780 long tons (1,809 t) – 1,810 long tons (1,839 t) (actual); 2,505 long tons (2,545 t) – 2,545 long tons (2,586 t) (deep load)
- Length: 339 ft 6 in (103.48 m) pp; 362 ft 9 in (110.57 m) oa
- Beam: 35 ft 8 in (10.87 m)
- Draught: 14 ft 2 in (4.32 m)
- Propulsion: 2 shaft Parsons geared turbines; 2 Admiralty 3-drum boilers; 40,000 shp (30,000 kW)
- Speed: 36.75 knots (42.29 mph; 68.06 km/h)
- Complement: 180-225
- Armament: 4 × 4.7-inch (120-mm) QF Mk IX guns (4×1); 2 × 40mm Bofors (1x2); 8 × 20 mm guns anti-aircraft guns; 8 × 21-inch (533 mm) torpedo tubes (2×4)

General characteristics as Type 16
- Class & type: Type 16 frigate
- Displacement: 1,800 long tons (1,800 t) standard; 2,300 long tons (2,300 t) full load
- Length: 362 ft 9 in (110.57 m) o/a
- Beam: 37 ft 9 in (11.51 m)
- Draught: 14 ft 6 in (4.42 m)
- Propulsion: 2 × Admiralty 3-drum boilers; Steam turbines, 40,000 shp; 2 shafts
- Speed: 32 knots (37 mph; 59 km/h) full load
- Complement: 175
- Sensors & processing systems: Type 293Q target indication Radar; Type 974 navigation Radar; Type 1010 Cossor Mark 10 IFF; Type 146B search Sonar; Type 147 depth finder Sonar; Type 162 target classification Sonar; Type 174 attack Sonar
- Armament: 1 × twin 4 in gun Mark 19; 1 × twin 40 mm Bofors gun Mk.5; 5 × single 40 mm Bofors gun Mk.9; 2 × Squid A/S mortar; 1 × quad 21 in (533 mm) tubes for Mk.9 torpedoes

HMS Tenacious was a T-class destroyer of the Royal Navy that saw service during the Second World War. She was built by Cammell Laird, of Birkenhead and launched on 24 March 1943.

== War service ==
The ship served from 1943 to 1944 in the Mediterranean (where she shared in the sinking of U-boat U-453 and also several E-boats), and the Aegean and Greek islands. The destroyer also took part in the liberation of France as support bombardment for the invasion of the South of France in July–August, 1944. HMS Tenacious was seconded to serve in East Indies Fleet, as part of the escort force of the 21st Aircraft Carrier Squadron in 1944–5, against the Japanese, then came under the command of the 3rd US Pacific fleet (Admiral Bull Halsey), and given a temporary pennant number D46 to enable identification by US naval forces. The R45 took part in bombardment of Truk in the Caroline Islands and bombardment of Japan. HMS Tenacious was part of the fleet assembled to witness surrender of Japanese in Tokyo harbour, then took part in the repatriation of POWs from Hammamatsu. The ship continued to serve in Australian waters and South China Sea, and rescued six RAAF personnel in S. China Sea, who had ditched their C-47 aircraft after both engines failed, on 4 January 1946.

She returned to Devonport in 1946 and was mothballed for future use.

== Postwar service ==
Between 1946 and 1949 Tenacious was held in reserve at Devonport. On 23 January 1949 she arrived in Mersey for a refit and in November of that year was commissioned as a target ship for the 3rd Submarine Flotilla at Rothesay.

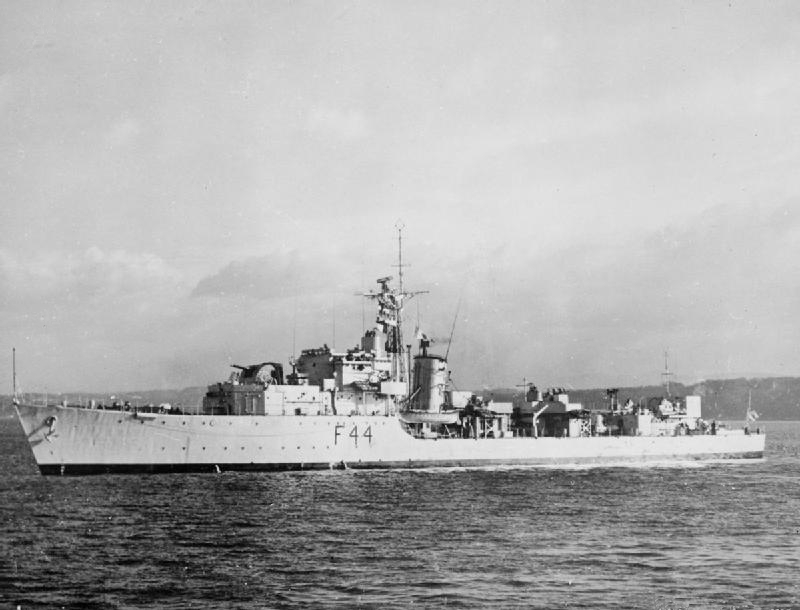
Tenacious after conversion to a Type 16 Frigate, c1952 (IWM)

Between January 1951 and 1952 she was converted at Rosyth to a Type 16 fast anti-submarine frigate, with the new pennant number F44. On 8 May 1952, she ran aground in the River Foyle in Northern Ireland. In 1953 she took part in the Fleet Review to celebrate the Coronation of Queen Elizabeth II.

In 1954 Tenacious was placed in reserve at Rosyth, then in 1956 into reserve at Barrow. In September 1963 she was towed to Plymouth. Tenacious was subsequently sold for scrapping in 1965 and arrived at Troon for breaking up on 29 June in that year.

== Publications ==
- Colledge, J. J.; Warlow, Ben (2006) [1969]. Ships of the Royal Navy: The Complete Record of All Fighting Ships of the Royal Navy from the 15th Century to the Present (3rd Rev ed.). London: Chatham Publishing. ISBN 978-1-86176-281-8. OCLC 67375475.
- Critchley, Mike (1982). British Warships Since 1945: Part 3: Destroyers. Liskeard, UK: Maritime Books. ISBN 0-9506323-9-2.
- Raven, Alan; Roberts, John (1978). War Built Destroyers O to Z Classes. London: Bivouac Books. ISBN 0-85680-010-4.
- Whitley, M. J. (1988). Destroyers of World War 2. Annapolis, Maryland: Naval Institute Press. ISBN 0-87021-326-1.
- Anonymous H.M.S. Tenacious: Her Story, printed without date by Richard Clay and Company, Ltd, Bungay, Suffolk.
