= HMS Tyrian (R67) =

T-class destroyer converted to Type 16 frigate of the Royal Navy

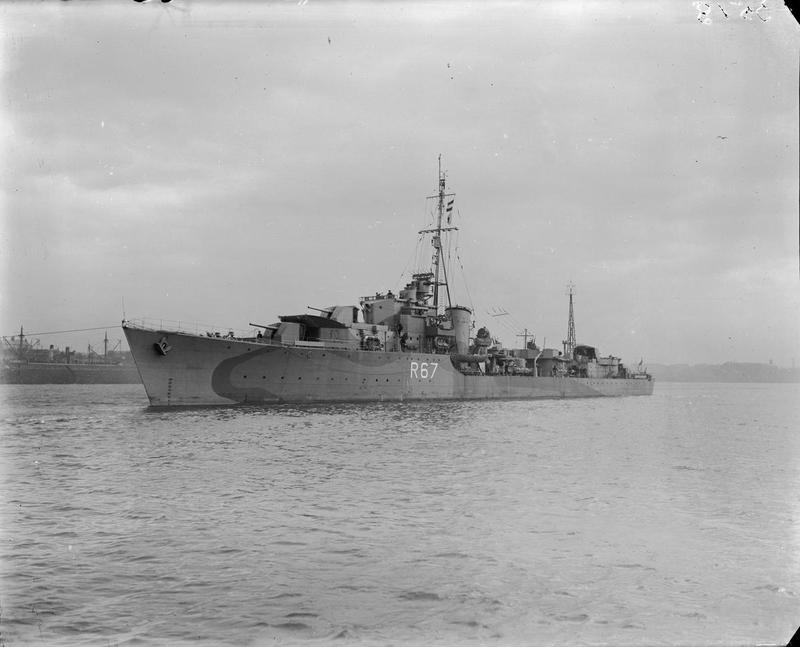
- HMS Tyrian underway, c1943 (IWM)

History

United Kingdom
- Name: HMS Tyrian
- Ordered: March 1941
- Builder: Swan Hunter and Wigham Richardson, Wallsend
- Laid down: 15 October 1941
- Launched: 27 July 1942
- Commissioned: 8 April 1943
- Identification: Pennant number: R67 (later F67)
- Motto: 'Tireless Ever'
- Honours and awards: Atlantic 1943; Sicily 1943; Salerno 1943; Mediterranean 1943; Adriatic 1944; South France 1944; Aegean 1944
- Fate: Arrived for scrapping on 9 March 1965
- Badge: On a Field Red, an owl Silver, with crook and flail Gold.

General characteristics as T–class
- Class & type: T-class destroyer
- Displacement: 1,710 long tons (1,737 t) – 1,730 long tons (1,758 t) (standard nominal); 1,780 long tons (1,809 t) – 1,810 long tons (1,839 t) (actual); 2,505 long tons (2,545 t) – 2,545 long tons (2,586 t) (deep load)
- Length: 339 ft 6 in (103.48 m) pp; 362 ft 9 in (110.57 m) oa
- Beam: 35 ft 8 in (10.87 m)
- Draught: 14 ft 2 in (4.32 m)
- Propulsion: 2 shaft Parsons geared turbines; 2 Admiralty 3-drum boilers; 40,000 shp (30,000 kW)
- Speed: 36.75 knots (42.29 mph; 68.06 km/h)
- Complement: 180–225
- Armament: 4 × 4.7-inch (120-mm) QF Mk IX guns (4×1); 2 × 40mm Bofors (1x2); 8 × 20 mm guns anti-aircraft guns; 8 × 21-inch (533 mm) torpedo tubes (2×4)

General characteristics as Type 16
- Class & type: Type 16 frigate
- Displacement: 1,800 long tons (1,800 t) standard; 2,300 long tons (2,300 t) full load
- Length: 362 ft 9 in (110.57 m) o/a
- Beam: 37 ft 9 in (11.51 m)
- Draught: 14 ft 6 in (4.42 m)
- Propulsion: 2 × Admiralty 3-drum boilers; Steam turbines, 40,000 shp; 2 shafts
- Speed: 32 knots (37 mph; 59 km/h) full load
- Complement: 175
- Sensors & processing systems: Type 293Q target indication Radar; Type 974 navigation Radar; Type 1010 Cossor Mark 10 IFF; Type 146B search Sonar; Type 147 depth finder Sonar; Type 162 target classification Sonar; Type 174 attack Sonar
- Armament: 1 × twin 4 in gun Mark 19; 1 × twin 40 mm Bofors gun Mk.5; 5 × single 40 mm Bofors gun Mk.9; 2 × Squid A/S mortar; 1 × quad 21 in (533 mm) tubes for Mk.9 torpedoes

HMS Tyrian was a T-class destroyer built for the Royal Navy during the Second World War.

== Description ==
Tyrian displaced 1,710 long tons (1,740 t) at standard load and 2,530 long tons (2,570 t) at deep load. She had an overall length of 362 feet 9 inches (110.6 m), a beam of 35 feet 8 inches (10.9 m) and a deep draught of 14 feet 6 inches (4.4 m). She was powered by two Parsons geared steam turbines, each driving one propeller shaft, using steam provided by two Admiralty three-drum boilers. The turbines developed a total of 40,000 shaft horsepower (30,000 kW) and gave a maximum speed of 36 knots (67 km/h; 41 mph). Tyrian carried a maximum of 615 long tons (625 t) of fuel oil that gave her a range of 4,675 nautical miles (8,658 km; 5,380 mi) at 20 knots (37 km/h; 23 mph). Her complement was 170 officers and ratings.

The ship was armed with four 45-calibre 4.7-inch (120 mm) Mark XII guns in dual-purpose mounts. For anti-aircraft (AA) defence, Tyrian had one twin mount for Bofors 40 mm guns and four twin 20-millimetre (0.8 in) Oerlikon autocannon. She was fitted with two above-water quadruple mounts for 21-inch (533 mm) torpedoes. Two depth charge rails and four throwers were fitted for which 70 depth charges were provided.

== Construction and career ==
Between 1946 and 1951 Tyrian was held in reserve at Harwich. Between 1951 and 1952 she was converted to a Type 16 fast anti-submarine frigate, by Harland & Wolff at Liverpool. She was also allocated the new pennant number F67. From August 1952 until 1956 she was part of the 2nd Training Squadron at Portland. In 1953 she took part in the Fleet Review to celebrate the Coronation of Queen Elizabeth II. On 29 September 1953, Tyrian ran aground on Haisborough Sands, South-East of Cromer. She was refloated later that day.

In November 1956 Tyrian was placed in reserve at Chatham. Between 1957 and 1965 she was part of the Lisahally reserve. She was subsequently sold for scrap and arrived at Troon for breaking up on 9 March 1965.

== Bibliography ==
- Chesneau, Roger, ed. (1980). Conway's All the World's Fighting Ships 1922–1946. Greenwich, UK: Conway Maritime Press. ISBN 0-85177-146-7.
- Colledge, J. J.; Warlow, Ben (2006) [1969]. Ships of the Royal Navy: The Complete Record of All Fighting Ships of the Royal Navy from the 15th Century to the Present (3rd Rev ed.). London: Chatham Publishing. ISBN 978-1-86176-281-8. OCLC 67375475.
- English, John (2001). Obdurate to Daring: British Fleet Destroyers 1941–45. Windsor, UK: World Ship Society. ISBN 978-0-9560769-0-8.
- Lenton, H. T. (1998). British & Empire Warships of the Second World War. Annapolis, Maryland: Naval Institute Press. ISBN 1-55750-048-7.
- Raven, Alan; Roberts, John (1978). War Built Destroyers O to Z Classes. London: Bivouac Books. ISBN 0-85680-010-4.
- Whitley, M. J. (1988). Destroyers of World War 2. Annapolis, Maryland: Naval Institute Press. ISBN 0-87021-326-1.
