= List of shipwrecks in 1962 =

The list of shipwrecks in 1962 includes all ships sunk, foundered, grounded, or otherwise lost during 1962.

table of contents
1962
| Jan | Feb | Mar | Apr |
| May | Jun | Jul | Aug |
| Sep | Oct | Nov | Dec |
Unknown date

== January ==
=== 3 January ===
List of shipwrecks: 3 January 1962
| Ship | State | Description |
|---|---|---|
| Kostantis Mpousses | Greece | The steamer foundered off Thassos in the Aegean Sea. |

=== 7 January ===
List of shipwrecks: 7 January 1962
| Ship | State | Description |
|---|---|---|
| Sabac | Yugoslavia | The cargo ship collided with Dorrington Court (United Kingdom) and sank off the Goodwin Sands, English Channel. Twenty-eight of her 33 crew were killed. |

=== 8 January ===
List of shipwrecks: 8 January 1962
| Ship | State | Description |
|---|---|---|
| Pinjarra | United Kingdom | The cargo liner ran aground at the mouth of the River Tees. Refloated the next day. |

=== 9 January ===
List of shipwrecks: 9 January 1962
| Ship | State | Description |
|---|---|---|
| Suerte | Lebanon | The Liberty ship ran aground off Shut-in Island, 15 nautical miles (28 km) off Halifax, Nova Scotia, Canada. She was on a voyage from Brest, Finistère, France to Halifax. She was declared a constructive total loss. Refloated on 5 April and scuttled the next day. |

=== 11 January ===
List of shipwrecks: 11 January 1962
| Ship | State | Description |
|---|---|---|
| B-37 | Soviet Navy | The submarine was destroyed at Ekaterininsky by an explosion. The submarine S-350 (Soviet Navy) was damaged by the explosion. A total of 132 people killed. |
| Fordfield | United Kingdom | The coaster capsized and sank 10 nautical miles (19 km) south east of the Owers Lightvessel, off Selsey Bill, Sussex. All nine crew rescued by Perla Dan (Denmark). |

=== 15 January ===
List of shipwrecks: 11 January 1962
| Ship | State | Description |
|---|---|---|
| KRI Matjan Tutul | Indonesian Navy | Battle of Arafura Sea: The TNC 45/Adjak-class motor torpedo boat was sunk in the Arafura Sea by HNLMS Evertsen (Royal Netherlands Navy) off western New Guinea. Three crewmen were killed with the survivors rescued by Evertsen. |

=== 16 January ===
List of shipwrecks: 16 January 1962
| Ship | State | Description |
|---|---|---|
| Finn Gemma | Norway | The coaster collided with Nordic in Bremen Harbour and sank. All 12 crew rescued. |

=== 17 January ===
List of shipwrecks: 17 January 1962
| Ship | State | Description |
|---|---|---|
| Neftegorsk | Soviet Union | The tanker ran aground off the mouth of the Gironde, France and was abandoned. |

=== 20 January ===
List of shipwrecks: 20 January 1962
| Ship | State | Description |
|---|---|---|
| Fides | Italy | The Liberty ship ran aground at the mouth of the Elbe and broke in two. She was on a voyage from Corpus Christi, Texas, United States to Gdynia, Poland. She was a total loss. |

=== 21 January ===
List of shipwrecks: 21 January 1962
| Ship | State | Description |
|---|---|---|
| Hjalmar Wessel | Norway | The cargo ship caught fire in the North Sea 60 nautical miles (110 km; 69 mi) northwest of Den Helder, Netherlands. Fire extinguished and ship towed to IJmuiden. |

=== 23 January ===
List of shipwrecks: 23 January 1962
| Ship | State | Description |
|---|---|---|
| Gladonia | United Kingdom | The coaster ran aground off the Hook of Holland, Netherlands. |

=== 31 January ===
List of shipwrecks: 31 January 1962
| Ship | State | Description |
|---|---|---|
| BP Driver | United Kingdom | The tanker ran aground at Porthcawl, Glamorgan. |

=== Unknown date ===
List of shipwrecks: Unknown date 1962
| Ship | State | Description |
|---|---|---|
| Gai Floreal | France | The fishing vessel ran aground near Bennal Cove, St. Ives, Cornwall, England. Her entire crew survived. She was refloated and towed to France. |

== February ==
=== 1 February ===
List of shipwrecks: 1 February 1962
| Ship | State | Description |
|---|---|---|
| Berta Kienass | West Germany | The trawler struck a mine and sank off the Netherlands with the loss of all but one of her fourteen crew. |
| Kozara | Greece | The cargo ship ran aground in the Black Sea. Refloated after nine days. |

=== 5 February ===
List of shipwrecks: 5 February 1962
| Ship | State | Description |
|---|---|---|
| Yanix | Greece | The Liberty ship sprang a leak and foundered 60 nautical miles (110 km) off Luzon Island, Philippines (19°04′N 120°37′E). All 29 crew were rescued. She was on a voyage from Madras, India to Kobe, Japan. |

=== 6 February ===
List of shipwrecks: 6 February 1962
| Ship | State | Description |
|---|---|---|
| Monarch | United States | The fishing boat capsized and sank without loss of life in the Pacific Ocean 1 nautical mile (1.9 km; 1.2 mi) off Clipperton Island. Later that day, her crew of 10 reached the island, where they remained for 23 days until the guided-missile destroyer USS Robison (United States Navy) rescued them on 1 March. |

=== 7 February ===
List of shipwrecks: 7 February 1962
| Ship | State | Description |
|---|---|---|
| Chickasaw | United States | The Type C2-F cargo ship ran aground on Santa Rosa Island, California. |

=== 9 February ===
List of shipwrecks: 9 February 1962
| Ship | State | Description |
|---|---|---|
| OS-18 | Soviet Navy | The decommissioned Gnevny-class destroyer was sunk as a target off the Tendra Spit. |

=== 11 February ===
List of shipwrecks: 11 February 1962
| Ship | State | Description |
|---|---|---|
| Barbro D | United States | The 8-gross register ton, 30.3-foot (9.2 m) fishing vessel sank at Juneau, Alaska. |

=== 16 February ===
List of shipwrecks: 16 February 1962
| Ship | State | Description |
|---|---|---|
| Enesei, and Giacomo | Soviet Union; Italy | The Liberty ship Giacomo was driven from her moorings in the Elbe and collided with the cargo ship Enesei, which also broke from her moorings. |
| Vladivostok | Soviet Union | The whaling factory ship heeled over at Kiel, West Germany whilst being fitted out. Thirty-five people were injured. |

=== 28 February ===
List of shipwrecks: 28 February 1962
| Ship | State | Description |
|---|---|---|
| Captayannis | Panama | The cargo ship ran aground in the North Sea off Goeree-Overflakkee, South Holland, Netherlands (51°40′N 3°25′E). She was refloated but deemed uneconomic to repair and was scrapped in April 1962. |

=== Unknown date ===
List of shipwrecks: Unknown date 1962
| Ship | State | Description |
|---|---|---|
| Delce | United Kingdom | The barge foundered in the Thames Estuary with the loss of both crew. |
| Kingsgate | United Kingdom | The coaster ran aground south of Berwick upon Tweed, Northumberland. |

== March ==
=== 4 March ===
List of shipwrecks: 4 March 1962
| Ship | State | Description |
|---|---|---|
| Island Lass | United Kingdom | The passenger ship foundered off North Ronaldsay, Orkney Islands. |

=== 8 March ===
List of shipwrecks: 8 March 1962
| Ship | State | Description |
|---|---|---|
| Gem | Liberia | The tanker broke in two in the Atlantic Ocean (33°33′N 75°18′W). She was taken in tow for Jacksonville, Florida, United States. She was declared a constructive total loss and scrapped. |
| USS Howorth | United States Navy | The decommissioned Fletcher-class destroyer was sunk as a torpedo target off San Clemente Island, California, by the submarines USS Volador and USS Salmon (both United States Navy). |

=== 11 March ===
List of shipwrecks: 11 March 1962
| Ship | State | Description |
|---|---|---|
| Eunice | United States | The 34-gross register ton, 55.2-foot (16.8 m) fishing vessel was destroyed by fire at Homer, Alaska. |
| Norwich Trader | United Kingdom | The coaster collided with Akinity (United Kingdom) and was beached on a sandbank off Kings Lynn, Norfolk. Later refloated and reached port. |
| Sand Dart | United Kingdom | The coaster ran aground at St Alban's Head, Swanage Dorset. |

=== 12 March ===
List of shipwrecks: 12 March 1962
| Ship | State | Description |
|---|---|---|
| Triton | United States | The 19-gross register ton 42.2-foot (12.9 m) motor vessel was destroyed by fire at Craig, Alaska. |

=== 14 March ===
List of shipwrecks: 14 March 1962
| Ship | State | Description |
|---|---|---|
| Athina | Greece | The cargo ship caught fire at Port-Saint-Louis-du-Rhône, Bouches-du-Rhône, France. The fire was extinguished two days later but she was declared a constructive total loss. Scrapped in August 1962. |

=== 15 March ===
List of shipwrecks: 15 March 1962
| Ship | State | Description |
|---|---|---|
| Sophie H | United States | The cargo ship ran aground near Augusta, Sicily, Italy. Refloated on 19 March. |

=== 16 March ===
List of shipwrecks: 16 March 1962
| Ship | State | Description |
|---|---|---|
| Athos II | Greece | The cargo ship ran aground off Hairsis Island, Turkey. She was on a voyage from Constanţa, Romania to Antwerp, Belgium. She was declared a constructive total loss and consequently scrapped. |
| Venezuela | Italy | The ocean liner ran aground off Cannes, France. |

=== 24 March ===
List of shipwrecks: 24 March 1962
| Ship | State | Description |
|---|---|---|
| Unknown schooner | Indonesia | The schooner was spotted, strafed and set afire near Fakfak by a Royal Netherlands Navy Lockheed P-2 Neptune aircraft. |

=== 25 March ===
List of shipwrecks: 25 March 1962
| Ship | State | Description |
|---|---|---|
| Marconia | United States | The 115-gross register ton, 74.5-foot (22.7 m) fishing vessel struck a reef and sank in Unga Strait (55°25′N 160°30′W) off the south coast of the Alaska Peninsula. |

=== 26 March ===
List of shipwrecks: 26 March 1962
| Ship | State | Description |
|---|---|---|
| USCGC Winnebago | United States Coast Guard | The Owasco-class cutter ran aground on Tripod Reef at the entrance to Pearl Harbor, Hawaii. She was refloated with the assistance of United States Navy tugs within a few days. |

=== 27 March ===
List of shipwrecks: 27 March 1962
| Ship | State | Description |
|---|---|---|
| British Mariner, and Palmyra | United Kingdom; West Germany | The cargo ship Palmyra collided with the tanker British Mariner 18 nautical miles (33 km) west of Ouessant, Finistère, France and sank. British Mariner was consequently declared a constructive total loss and was scrapped in May 1962. |
| Chignik 7 | United States | The 8-gross register ton, 31.3-foot (9.5 m) fishing vessel was wrecked near Ivanof Bay, Alaska. |

=== 28 March ===
List of shipwrecks: 28 March 1962
| Ship | State | Description |
|---|---|---|
| Ridunian | United Kingdom | On voyage from Alderney to Guernsey with a cargo of gravel, was wrecked on rocks, off Guernsey. |

=== 29 March ===
List of shipwrecks: 29 March 1962
| Ship | State | Description |
|---|---|---|
| Kirsten Skou | Denmark | The cargo ship collided with Karpfanger (West Germany) and sank in the English Channel off Dover, Kent. All 35 crew saved. |

=== 30 March ===
List of shipwrecks: 30 March 1962
| Ship | State | Description |
|---|---|---|
| Skyros | Greece | The bulk carrier ran aground off To-shima, Tokyo and was severely damaged. She was on a voyage from Kobe, Japan to Los Angeles, California, United States. Consequently scrapped. |

=== Unknown date ===
List of shipwrecks: Unknown date 1962
| Ship | State | Description |
|---|---|---|
| Wear Breeze | Australia | The cargo ship ran aground at Jeddah, Saudi Arabia. She was on a voyage from Hamburg, West Germany to Colombo, Ceylon. She was refloated with the assistance of the tug Svitzer (Denmark) but was declared a constructive total loss and consequently scrapped in July. |

== April ==
=== 3 April ===
List of shipwrecks: 3 April 1962
| Ship | State | Description |
|---|---|---|
| Inchmay | Hong Kong | The cargo ship ran aground at Wakayama, Japan. Later refloated and returned to service. |

=== 6 April ===
List of shipwrecks: 6 April 1962
| Ship | State | Description |
|---|---|---|
| Suerte | Lebanon | The Liberty ship was scuttled off the coast of Canada. |

=== 13 April ===
List of shipwrecks: 13 April 1962
| Ship | State | Description |
|---|---|---|
| Portador | Spain | The cargo ship caught fire in the Atlantic Ocean 250 nautical miles (460 km) off the coast of Ireland (51°15′N 15°34′W) and was abandoned by her crew. She was on a voyage from Manchester, Lancashire, United Kingdom to Comeau Bay. Presumed to have subsequently sank. |

=== 15 April ===
List of shipwrecks: 15 April 1962
| Ship | State | Description |
|---|---|---|
| Theopan | Liberia | The Liberty ship caught fire at Beirut, Lebanon. She was declared a constructive total loss. |

=== 18 April ===
List of shipwrecks: 18 April 1962
| Ship | State | Description |
|---|---|---|
| Augustenburg | West Germany | The cargo ship collided with Colorado (Denmark) and sank 24 nautical miles (44 km) south of the Nab Tower off the Isle of Wight, United Kingdom. |

=== 19 April ===
List of shipwrecks: 19 April 1962
| Ship | State | Description |
|---|---|---|
| Unknown speedboat | Indonesia | The speed boat was shelled and sunk by HNLMS Evertsen (Royal Netherlands Navy) off Fakfak. |

=== 21 April ===
List of shipwrecks: 21 April 1962
| Ship | State | Description |
|---|---|---|
| Cena | United States | The 10-gross register ton motor vessel sank near Turnabout Island (57°07′30″N 133°58′40″W) in Frederick Sound in the Alexander Archipelago in Southeast Alaska. |

=== 30 April ===
List of shipwrecks: 30 April 1962
| Ship | State | Description |
|---|---|---|
| Bahia de Nepe | Cuba | The ship was attacked and sunk by a Guatemalan Air Force aircraft after firing on the aircraft when ordered to identify herself. Guatemalan President Miguel Ydígoras Fuentes claimed the ship was running arms to Guatemala. |

== May ==
=== 5 May ===
List of shipwrecks: 5 May 1962
| Ship | State | Description |
|---|---|---|
| Quest | Norway | The schooner-rigged steamship struck ice and sank north of Labrador, Canada. |

=== 7 May ===
List of shipwrecks: 7 May 1962
| Ship | State | Description |
|---|---|---|
| Clan Chisholm | United Kingdom | The cargo ship caught fire at sea whilst on a voyage from Glasgow, Renfrewship to Dar-es-Salaam, Tanganyika. She put in to Mombasa, Kenya the next day. The fire was extinguished on 10 May. Clan Chisholm was declared damaged beyond economic repair. She was subsequently towed to Hong Kong for scrapping. |

=== 15 May ===
List of shipwrecks: 15 May 1962
| Ship | State | Description |
|---|---|---|
| Empress | United States | The 71-gross register ton, 78.8-foot (24.0 m) fishing vessel was destroyed by fire near Pleasant Island in the Icy Strait in Southeast Alaska. |
| Sea Venture | United States | The 150-gross register ton, 130.1-foot (39.7 m) fishing vessel sank in the Bering Sea approximately 20 nautical miles (37 km) north of Seguam Island in the Aleutian Islands. |

=== 23 May ===
List of shipwrecks: 23 May 1962
| Ship | State | Description |
|---|---|---|
| Forager | United Kingdom | The tug capsized and sank in River Clyde whilst towing Hororata (United Kingdom). Forager was refloated on 5 June and later repaired. In service until scrapped in 1984. |

=== 24 May ===
List of shipwrecks: 24 May 1962
| Ship | State | Description |
|---|---|---|
| Tollman | United Kingdom | The tug capsized and sank at Hull, Yorkshire with the loss of three of her five crew. |

=== 28 May ===
List of shipwrecks: 28 May 1962
| Ship | State | Description |
|---|---|---|
| Star 2 | United States | The 7-gross register ton, 28.4-foot (8.7 m) fishing vessel was destroyed by fire at Larsen Bay, Alaska. |

== June ==
=== 9 June ===
List of shipwrecks: 9 June 1962
| Ship | State | Description |
|---|---|---|
| Theoforos | Honduras | The Liberty ship ran aground off Tallinn, Soviet Union. She was refloated but declared a constructive total loss. |

=== 14 June ===
List of shipwrecks: 14 June 1962
| Ship | State | Description |
|---|---|---|
| Hai Chang | China | The Liberty ship foundered off the Pescadores Islands (23°38′N 119°50′E). |

=== 15 June ===
List of shipwrecks: 15 June 1962
| Ship | State | Description |
|---|---|---|
| Nyon | Switzerland | The cargo ship collided with Jalazad (India) and sank 5 nautical miles (9.3 km) south of Beachy Head, Sussex, United Kingdom. All 32 crew rescued by Jalazad. |

=== 30 June ===
List of shipwrecks: 30 June 1962
| Ship | State | Description |
|---|---|---|
| Nautilus 2 | Unknown | Vietnam War: Battle of Quang Khe: The junk was shelled, rammed, and sunk by T-161 (Vietnam People's Navy) off the navy base at Quang Khe, North Vietnam. |
| T-185 | Vietnam People's Navy | Vietnam War: Battle of Quang Khe: The Type 55A gunboat was sunk with limpet mines at the navy base at Quang Khe, North Vietnam, by South Vietnamese commandos. She was raised, repaired, returned to service. |

== July ==
=== 4 July ===
List of shipwrecks: 4 July 1962
| Ship | State | Description |
|---|---|---|
| Unnamed | South Africa | The fishing vessel collided with the Victory ship South Africa Victory (South Africa) off the coast of Natal. She was taken in tow by South Africa Victory but consequently sank Her sixteen crew were rescued by South Africa Victory. |

=== 6 July ===
List of shipwrecks: 6 July 1962
| Ship | State | Description |
|---|---|---|
| Tuaikaepau | New Zealand | The vessel ran aground on the Minerva Reef. Crew lived in the wreck of a Japanese vessel, wrecked two years earlier, for seven weeks before making a raft and some of them sailed to Fiji. Five crew died before rescue came. |

=== 7 July ===
List of shipwrecks: 7 July 1962
| Ship | State | Description |
|---|---|---|
| USS Fullam | United States Navy | The decommissioned Fletcher-class destroyer was sunk as a target in the Atlantic Ocean 180 nautical miles (330 km) south of Cape Henry, Virginia. |
| Star of Mecca | Saudi Arabia | The cargo ship ran aground near Jeddah, a total loss. |

=== 9 July ===
List of shipwrecks: 9 July 1962
| Ship | State | Description |
|---|---|---|
| Roberto Parodi | Italy | The Liberty ship ran aground on the Colorado Reefs, off the coast of Cuba. She was on a voyage from Tampa, Florida, United States to Tokyo, Japan. She was refloated on 17 July and put in to Havana, Cuba. |

=== 18 July ===
List of shipwrecks: 18 July 1962
| Ship | State | Description |
|---|---|---|
| Two Brothers | United States | The 24-gross register ton, 49.9-foot (15.2 m) fishing vessel sank west of Karluk Reef (60°27′N 151°24′W) in Prince William Sound off the coast of Alaska. |

=== 30 July ===
List of shipwrecks: 30 July 1962
| Ship | State | Description |
|---|---|---|
| Montrose | United Kingdom | The 4,993-ton freighter struck a steel barge being pushed by a tug and sank under the bridge on the Detroit River the night of 30 July 1962. The collision ripped a hole in the side of the freighter causing water to flood into the front of the ship. All the crew got off safely and The Windsor Star reported about 20,000 spectators in Windsor and Detroit watched "the lumbering ship flop to her side in 30 feet of water". The 440-foot (130 m) vessel was said to be valued at $6 to $8 million, exclusive of cargo, and was just 18 months old. She was coming from France to the Great Lakes with a cargo of wine and 200 tons of aluminum. The wreck was refloated on 5 November. |

=== Unknown date ===
List of shipwrecks: Unknown date July 1962
| Ship | State | Description |
|---|---|---|
| USS Ira Jeffery | United States Navy | The decommissioned Buckley-class destroyer escort was sunk as a target. |

== August ==
=== 1 August ===
List of shipwrecks: 1 August
| Ship | State | Description |
|---|---|---|
| Leanne | United States | The 12-gross register ton, 29.8-foot (9.1 m) fishing vessel was destroyed by fire at Sand Point, Alaska. |

=== 3 August ===
List of shipwrecks: 3 August 1962
| Ship | State | Description |
|---|---|---|
| Medina Princess | United Kingdom | The cargo ship ran around off Djibouti. She was refloated. |

=== 4 August ===
List of shipwrecks: 4 August 1962
| Ship | State | Description |
|---|---|---|
| Elias X | Lebanon | The Liberty ship lost her rudder in the Arabian Sea (12°40′N 63°59′E). She was on a voyage from Mormugao, India to an Italian port. She was towed in to Bombay, India on 22 August. She was declared a constructive total loss. |
| Sara B | United States | The 9-gross register ton, 34.3-foot (10.5 m) fishing vessel was destroyed by fire on the west side of Renard Island (59°55′N 149°20′W) approximately 15 nautical miles (28 km; 17 mi) from Seward, Alaska. |
| Summit | United States | The 9-gross register ton, 28.3-foot (8.6 m) fishing vessel sank in Alitak Bay (56°50′N 154°10′W) on the coast of Kodiak Island. |

=== 8 August ===
List of shipwrecks: 8 August 1962
| Ship | State | Description |
|---|---|---|
| Aleutian II | United States | The 12-gross register ton, 29.6-foot (9.0 m) fishing vessel sank near Makushin Bay (53°44′N 167°00′W) on the coast of Unalaska Island in the Aleutian Islands. |

=== 15 August ===
List of shipwrecks: 15 August 1962
| Ship | State | Description |
|---|---|---|
| Jenny III | Liberia | The Liberty ship ran aground in the Guayas River, Ecuador. She was on a voyage from Guayaquil, Ecuador to New Orleans, Louisiana, United States. She was refloated that day. |

=== 22 August ===
List of shipwrecks: 22 August 1962
| Ship | State | Description |
|---|---|---|
| Amy D | United States | The 23-gross register ton, 41-foot (12.5 m) fishing vessel sank in "Mallard Bay" on the coast of Alaska. The wreck report does not specify whether the sinking occurred in Mallard Bay (60.2949°N 147.8178°W) on the coast of Knight Island in Prince William Sound on the south-central coast of Alaska or in Mallard Bay (54.7786111°N 131.9994444°W) on the coast of Prince of Wales Island in the Alexander Archipelago in Southeast Alaska. |

=== 25 August ===
List of shipwrecks: 25 August 1962
| Ship | State | Description |
|---|---|---|
| Clan Chisholm | United Kingdom | The cargo ship, awaiting scrapping, heeled over at Hong Kong. She was subsequently righted and scrapped. |

=== 26 August ===
List of shipwrecks: 26 August 1962
| Ship | State | Description |
|---|---|---|
| Eudora | United States | The 143-gross register ton, 100.6-foot (30.7 m) pleasure craft was wrecked at Cape Devine (55°22′45″N 160°09′00″W) on Korovin Island in Alaska's Shumagin Islands off the south coast of the Alaska Peninsula. |

=== 28 August ===
List of shipwrecks: 28 August 1962
| Ship | State | Description |
|---|---|---|
| Jenny III | Liberia | The Liberty ship ran aground on the Serrana Bank, in the Gulf of Mexico. She was later refloated and towed to New Orleans, Louisiana, where she was declared a constructive total loss. |

=== 30 August ===
List of shipwrecks: 30 August 1962
| Ship | State | Description |
|---|---|---|
| Planet | United States | The 43-gross register ton, 49.8-foot (15.2 m) motor cargo vessel was lost after colliding with the motor vessel Mutual (United States) in Clarence Strait in the Alexander Archipelago in Southeast Alaska. |

== September ==
=== 1 September ===
List of shipwrecks: 2 September 1962
| Ship | State | Description |
|---|---|---|
| Benarty | United Kingdom | Typhoon Wanda: The heavy lift ship was driven ashore at North Point, Hong Kong. She was refloated on 14 September, repaired and returned to service. |
| Crescent | Panama | Typhoon Wanda: The Liberty ship was driven ashore at Hong Kong. Declared a constructive total loss, she was scrapped in situ. |
| Fortune Lory | Hong Kong | Typhoon Wanda The cargo ship ran aground in Tolo Harbour. She was refloated but found to be damaged beyond economic repair and was consequently scrapped. |

=== 2 September ===
Typhoon Wanda - twenty ships aground or sunk at Hong Kong, including -

List of shipwrecks: 2 September 1962
| Ship | State | Description |
|---|---|---|
| Carronpark | United Kingdom | The cargo ship was driven ashore. |
| Kowloon Dock | United Kingdom | The tug foundered with the loss of all 30 crew. |
| Mayon | Panama | The cargo ship was severely damaged when Ruthy Ann (United Kingdom) broke free from her mooring and was driven onto the smaller ship. |
| Merchant Prince | United Kingdom | The cargo ship collided with Grosvenor Navigator (Hong Kong) off Hong Kong. |
| Ocean Glory | Hong Kong | The cargo ship broke from her moorings in a typhoon at Hong Kong. She collided with Grosvenor Navigator (Hong Kong) and was damaged. Ocean Glory was declared a constructive total loss and sold for scrap. |
| Saldura | United Kingdom | The cargo ship collided with Leefoon (Hong Kong) |

=== 4 September ===
List of shipwrecks: 4 September 1962
| Ship | State | Description |
|---|---|---|
| D & M II | United States | The 84-gross register ton, 110.2-foot (33.6 m) barge sank off Ocean Cape (59°32′30″N 139°51′30″W) on the south-central coast of Alaska. |
| Rudakof | United States | A storm destroyed the 171-gross register ton, 82.2-foot (25.1 m) motor vessel at the mouth of the Kaliakh River (60°05′40″N 142°48′30″W) on the south-central coast of Alaska. |

=== 6 September ===
List of shipwrecks: 6 September 1962
| Ship | State | Description |
|---|---|---|
| Guide | United States | The motor vessel sank at Angoon, Alaska. |

=== 7 September ===
List of shipwrecks: 7 September 1962
| Ship | State | Description |
|---|---|---|
| Dixie | United States | The 8-gross register ton, 30.8-foot (9.4 m) fishing vessel sank in Kasaan Bay (55°24′N 132°06′W) in Southeast Alaska. |

=== 9 September ===
List of shipwrecks: 9 September 1962
| Ship | State | Description |
|---|---|---|
| Theoforos | Greece | The Liberty ship ran aground on the Kuradimuna Rocks, in the Gulf of Bothnia. She was on a voyage from Leningrad, Soviet Union to a Cuban port. She was refloated the next day and towed in to Tallinn, Estonia, where she was declared a constructive total loss. |

=== 13 September ===
List of shipwrecks: 13 September 1962
| Ship | State | Description |
|---|---|---|
| Unidentified fishing trawler | Japan | The fishing trawler sank in a collision with a Soviet Navy submarine. Sixteen of her crew were detained. |

=== 14 September ===
List of shipwrecks: 14 September 1962
| Ship | State | Description |
|---|---|---|
| Sisu | United States | The 11-gross register ton, 32.4-foot (9.9 m) fishing vessel sank in Swanson Harbor (58°11′30″N 135°05′00″W) in Southeast Alaska. |

=== 20 September ===
List of shipwrecks: 20 September 1962
| Ship | State | Description |
|---|---|---|
| Georges | Liberia | The Liberty ship was wrecked on the north coast of the Soviet Union (69°52′N 61°10′E). She was on a voyage from Igarka, Soviet Union to London, United Kingdom. |

=== 21 September ===
List of shipwrecks: 21 September 1962
| Ship | State | Description |
|---|---|---|
| Ketovia | United States | The 53-gross register ton, 57.6-foot (17.6 m) fishing vessel was destroyed by fire in Cook Inlet on the south-central coast of Alaska. |

=== 28 September ===
List of shipwrecks: 28 September 1962
| Ship | State | Description |
|---|---|---|
| Alaska Roustabout | United States | The 119-gross register ton, 99.9-foot (30.4 m) tug sank in the Gulf of Alaska. |

=== 30 September ===
List of shipwrecks: 30 September 1962
| Ship | State | Description |
|---|---|---|
| Major | United Kingdom | The Thames barge ran aground off Walton-on-the-Naze, Essex in a storm. |
| Widder | West Germany | The coaster ran aground at Canna, Scotland in a storm. |

=== Unknown date ===
List of shipwrecks: Unknown September 1962
| Ship | State | Description |
|---|---|---|
| Chromite | United States | The 366-foot (112 m) Design B7-D1 concrete-hulled barge was sunk as a breakwater at Carlos, Kwajalein, sometime in September. |

== October ==
=== 1 October ===
List of shipwrecks: 1 October 1962
| Ship | State | Description |
|---|---|---|
| Mattie J | United States | The 14-gross register ton, 32.6-foot (9.9 m) fishing vessel sank at Chilkat (60°11′N 144°12′W), Alaska. |

=== 7 October ===
List of shipwrecks: 7 October 1962
| Ship | State | Description |
|---|---|---|
| Beater | Canada | Hurricane Daisy: The sealer, a converted minesweeper, was driven ashore and wrecked at New Harbour, Nova Scotia. |

=== 12 October ===
List of shipwrecks: 12 October 1962
| Ship | State | Description |
|---|---|---|
| S R 22 | United States | The 650-gross register ton, 110.3-foot (33.6 m) barge sank in the Gulf of Alaska near Chirikof Island. |

=== 13 October ===
List of shipwrecks: 13 October 1962
| Ship | State | Description |
|---|---|---|
| Cima 8 | Cuban Revolutionary Navy | The auxiliary patrol boat was sunk in the Cardenas Bay by a Cuban Exile operated boat. |

=== 14 October ===
List of shipwrecks: 14 October 1962
| Ship | State | Description |
|---|---|---|
| White Cloud | Panama | The Liberty ship was driven ashore at the entrance to Humboldt Bay. She was on a voyage from Coos Bay to Eureka, California, United States. She was refloated on 22 October and towed in to Eureka, where she was declared a constructive total loss. |

=== 21 October ===
List of shipwrecks: 21 October 1962
| Ship | State | Description |
|---|---|---|
| M-1545F | Republic of China Navy | Chinese Civil War: The sailboat was shelled and sunk by No. 504 and No. 587 (both (China) People's Liberation Army Navy). |
| Sanct Svithun | Norway | The passenger ship ran aground off the Vikna Islands, refloated then sank with the loss of 33 of the 79 passengers and crew. |

=== 22 October ===
List of shipwrecks: 22 October 1962
| Ship | State | Description |
|---|---|---|
| Johnny O | United States | The 7-gross register ton, 27.6-foot (8.4 m) fishing vessel was wrecked at Thomas Basin in Ketchikan, Alaska. |

=== 26 October ===
List of shipwrecks: 26 October 1962
| Ship | State | Description |
|---|---|---|
| Costas Michalos | Greece | The Liberty ship ran aground on the Banc les Quenocs, off Calais, France, and broke in two, a total loss. |

=== 28 October ===
List of shipwrecks: 28 October 1962
| Ship | State | Description |
|---|---|---|
| Lisieux | France | The ferry caught fire on a voyage between Newhaven, Sussex, United Kingdom and Dieppe. Escorted into Dieppe at reduced speed. |

=== 29 October ===
List of shipwrecks: 29 October 1962
| Ship | State | Description |
|---|---|---|
| Matelots Pillien et Peyrat | France | The cargo ship was driven ashore in a storm at Port-de-Bouc, Bouches-du-Rhône and sank at the entrance to the Canal de Marseille au Rhône. Refloated on 3 November but declared a constructive total loss and scrapped. |

== November ==
=== 2 November ===
List of shipwrecks: 2 November 1962
| Ship | State | Description |
|---|---|---|
| Ella Hewett | United Kingdom | The 170.1-foot (51.8 m), 595-ton trawler struck the sunken wreck of HMS Drake (Royal Navy) in Church Bay, Northern Ireland and sank the next day. Declared a total loss. On 18–29 September 1978 her wreck was dispersed with explosives. |
| Musketier | Netherlands | The coaster ran aground at Crail, Fife, United Kingdom. Broke in two and sank on 6 November. |
| Rana | Netherlands | The coaster sprang a leak and sank 25 nautical miles (46 km) off the west coast of Denmark. |
| Santa Irene | Costa Rica | The Ocean ship ran aground on the Los Cabezos Shoal, west of Tarifa, Spain and was wrecked. |

=== 10 November ===
List of shipwrecks: 10 November 1962
| Ship | State | Description |
|---|---|---|
| East Star | Canada | The coaster developed a severe list 130 nautical miles (240 km) of Bermuda and was abandoned. Crew rescued after nine days by San Gaspar (United Kingdom). East Star was taken in tow by Mount Borga (Norway). |
| Zephyr | Liberia | The cargo ship ran aground at Gladden Spit, British Honduras. Caught fire on 17 November, refloated on 27 November. Declared a constructive total loss but sold, repaired and returned to service. |

=== 11 November ===
List of shipwrecks: 11 November 1962
| Ship | State | Description |
|---|---|---|
| Jean Gougy | France | The fishing vessel ran aground at Land's End, Cornwall, United Kingdom and capsized. Eight of the twenty crew were rescued by helicopter or breeches buoy. Sergeant Eric Smith of 22 Squadron, Royal Air Force was awarded a George Medal for his actions in the rescue. |

=== 14 November ===
List of shipwrecks: 14 November 1962
| Ship | State | Description |
|---|---|---|
| A M | United States | The 7-gross register ton, 27.7-foot (8.4 m) fishing vessel was destroyed by fire in Cook Inlet at the mouth of the Kasilof River on the south-central coast of Alaska. |

=== 16 November ===
List of shipwrecks: 16 November 1962
| Ship | State | Description |
|---|---|---|
| USS Aspro | United States Navy | The decommissioned Balao-class submarine was sunk as a target in the Pacific Ocean off San Diego, California, by the submarine USS Pomodon (United States Navy). |

=== 17 November ===
List of shipwrecks: 17 November 1962
| Ship | State | Description |
|---|---|---|
| RNLB George Elmy | RNLI | The lifeboat foundered in the 'Seaham Lifeboat Disaster' with the loss of eight men and one boy (all five crew members and four of the five people they were trying to rescue). |

=== 18 November ===
List of shipwrecks: 18 November 1962
| Ship | State | Description |
|---|---|---|
| Ashanti Palm | United Kingdom | The cargo ship was driven into a breakwater at Naples, Italy, and sank. She was on a voyage from Genoa, Italy to Port Harcourt, Nigeria |
| Captain George | Greece | The Liberty ship exploded and sank 300 nautical miles (560 km) north of Bermuda (36°49′N 61°24′W) with the loss of all 18 crew. |
| RFA Green Ranger | Royal Fleet Auxiliary | The fleet support tanker ran aground south of Hartland Point, Devon, England, and was wrecked. All seven crew rescued by breeches buoy. |

=== 23 November ===
List of shipwrecks: 23 November 1962
| Ship | State | Description |
|---|---|---|
| Berea | South Africa | The motor vessel ran aground at Ponta Barra da Falsa, Mozambique, a total loss. |
| Tainamshan | Hong Kong | The coaster ran aground off Swatow, China. She was on a voyage from Hong Kong to Fuzhou, China. She capsized and sank on 26 November. |

=== 25 November ===
List of shipwrecks: 25 November 1962
| Ship | State | Description |
|---|---|---|
| Alstertor | | The ship (2,460 GRT) ran aground on Scharhörn and could later be pulled off the reef. |
| No. 8 Xijin | Republic of China Navy | Chinese Civil War: The infiltration ship was shelled and sunk by No. 547, No. 567 and No. 577 (all (China) People's Liberation Army Navy). 26 crewmen were taken as prisoners of war. |

=== 28 November ===
List of shipwrecks: 28 November 1962
| Ship | State | Description |
|---|---|---|
| Ike | United States | The Liberty ship ran aground on a reef in the Red Sea (14°40′N 42°49′E). Beached and abandoned, she was declared a constructive total loss. |

=== 29 November ===
List of shipwrecks: 29 November 1962
| Ship | State | Description |
|---|---|---|
| Ragna Ringdal | Norway | The cargo liner ran aground off Vatoa Island, Fiji. All passengers and crew rescued after three days. |

=== Unknown date ===
List of shipwrecks: Unknown 1962
| Ship | State | Description |
|---|---|---|
| Hanlasan | Republic of Korea Navy | The Baekdusan-class submarine chaser was sunk in a typhoon in the Pacific Ocean at Guam. She later was raised and was scrapped in 1964. |
| N P Corp. No. 41 | United States | The 38-gross register ton 60.2-foot (18.3 m) barge sank in the Gulf of Alaska off Cape Saint Elias, Alaska. |

== December ==
=== 2 December ===
List of shipwrecks: 2 December 1962
| Ship | State | Description |
|---|---|---|
| Tuscany | Liberia | The Liberty ship ran aground on the Ladd Reef (8°40′N 111°40′E), a total loss. |

=== 3 December ===
List of shipwrecks: 3 December 1962
| Ship | State | Description |
|---|---|---|
| Boston Heron | United Kingdom | The 130.7-foot (39.8 m), 314-ton trawler was wrecked in a gale on a reef off Stilamair Island, Isle of Scalpay. Her captain and four crew survived, while seven others died. |

=== 5 December ===
List of shipwrecks: 5 December 1962
| Ship | State | Description |
|---|---|---|
| Link One | United Kingdom | The cargo ship collided with Pulkovo (Soviet Union) and sank in the Baltic Sea south east of the Gedser Lightship, off the east coast of Denmark. All crew took to the lifeboats and were rescued by Lechistan (Poland). |
| No. 1 Xiangshan | Republic of China Navy | Chinese Civil War: The infiltration ship was shelled and sunk by No. 508 and No. 518 (all (China) People's Liberation Army Navy). 23 crewmen killed, 6 crewmen taken as prisoners of war. |

=== 8 December ===
List of shipwrecks: 8 December 1962
| Ship | State | Description |
|---|---|---|
| Cornish City | United Kingdom | The cargo ship caught fire at Aden, Aden Protectorate. She was on a voyage from Baton Rouge, Louisiana, United States to Calcutta, India. Temporary repairs were made and she was towed to Bombay, India. Consequently scrapped. |

=== 16 December ===
List of shipwrecks: 16 December 1962
| Ship | State | Description |
|---|---|---|
| Aristoteles | Greece | The cargo ship, which had sprung a leak the day before and had been abandoned by her crew, sank 320 nautical miles (600 km) north east of Funchal, Madeira (36°48′N 14°40′W). She was on a voyage from Detroit, Illinois, United States to Calcutta, India. |
| Atlantic Sun | United States | The T3 tanker collided with the tanker Esso New York (United States) in Delaware Bay. Atlantic Sun was on a voyage from Philadelphia, Pennsylvania to Jacksonville, Florida. Repairs were declared uneconomic, and she was consequently scrapped. |
| Loide Honduras | Brazil | The cargo ship ran aground in the West Scheldt, Belgium. |
| Nautilus | West Germany | The cargo ship sank off the Netherlands with the loss of all but one of her 24 crew. |
| Uilenspiegel | Belgium | The pirate radio ship was driven ashore in a storm. She had got into difficulties off Zeebrugge and an attempt was made to tow her to Vlissingen, Netherlands but she broke her tow. |

=== 18 December ===
List of shipwrecks: 18 December 1962
| Ship | State | Description |
|---|---|---|
| Ridgefield | Liberia | The Liberty ship ran aground at Grand Cayman Island and broke in two, a total loss. |

=== 20 December ===
List of shipwrecks: 20 December 1962
| Ship | State | Description |
|---|---|---|
| Aghios Nicolaus | Greece | The coaster ran aground off Tripoli, Lebanon. All nine crew rescued by a Royal Air Force helicopter. Aghios Nicolaus was later refloated. |

=== 23 December ===
List of shipwrecks: 23 December 1962
| Ship | State | Description |
|---|---|---|
| Gernik | Netherlands | The cargo ship ran aground off Karpathos, Greece. Her crew were rescued. She was declared a constructive total loss. |

=== 30 December ===
List of shipwrecks: 30 December 1962
| Ship | State | Description |
|---|---|---|
| Gwendoline Steers (or Gwendolyn Steers) | United States | During a voyage from New York City to Northport, Long Island, New York, the 90-foot (27.4 m) or 96-foot (29.3 m) (sources disagree), 164-gross register ton tug sank in 40 to 55 feet (12 to 17 m) (sources disagree) of water in Long Island Sound at 40°57.282′N 073°25.758′W — a location described both as off Oyster Bay, Long Island, and as off the entrance to the harbor at Huntington, New York — during a blizzard with the loss of all nine crew. |

== Unknown date ==
List of shipwrecks: Unknown date 1962
| Ship | State | Description |
|---|---|---|
| USS Amesbury | United States Navy | The decommissioned Charles Lawrence-class high-speed transport sank 5 nautical miles (9.3 km; 5.8 mi) west of Key West, Florida, while under tow to a scrapyard sometime after her 24 October 1962 sale for scrapping. |
| Regina | United States | The 7-gross register ton, 30.9-foot (9.4 m) motor passenger vessel was destroyed by fire at Chignik, Alaska. |
| "Zyava III" | United Kingdom | The 50-foot (15 m) fishing vessel stranded on Wyre End and sank sometime in 1962. Later salvaged and returned to service. |
