= Sudomo =

Indonesian military official

Admiral (Ret.) Sudomo
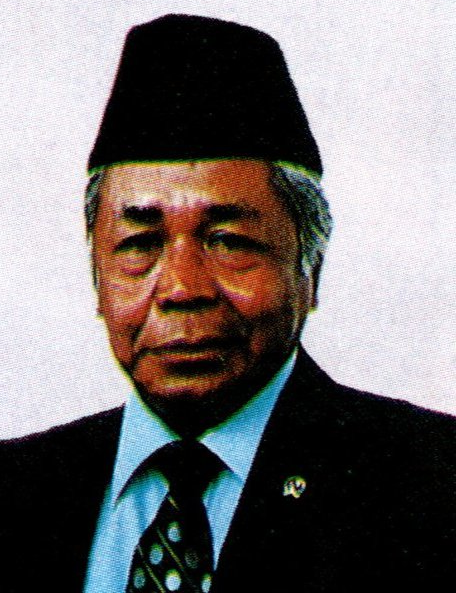
- Sudomo as Minister of Manpower

9th Chairman of the Supreme Advisory Council
- In office 1993–1998
- President: Suharto
- Preceded by: Maraden Panggabean
- Succeeded by: Arnold Achmad Baramuli

3rd Coordinating Ministry for Political and Security Affairs
- In office 23 March 1988 – 17 March 1993
- President: Suharto
- Preceded by: Surono Reksodimedjo
- Succeeded by: Susilo Sudarman

16th Minister of Manpower
- In office 19 March 1983 – 23 March 1988
- President: Suharto
- Preceded by: Harun Zain
- Succeeded by: Cosmas Batubara

5th Commander for Security and Order
- In office 5 April 1978 – 29 March 1983
- Preceded by: Suharto
- Succeeded by: Leonardus Benjamin Moerdani

6th Chief of Staff of the Navy
- In office 16 December 1969 – 26 June 1973
- President: Suharto
- Preceded by: Moeljadi
- Succeeded by: Ricardus Subono

Personal details
- Born: 20 September 1926 Malang, East Java, Dutch East Indies
- Died: 18 April 2012 (aged 85) Jakarta, Indonesia
- Cause of death: Stroke
- Resting place: Kalibata Heroes' Cemetery, Jakarta, Indonesia
- Spouses: Fransisca Play; Fransisca Diah Widhowaty; Aty Kusumawaty
- Children: Biakto Trikora Putra; Dewi Prihatina Dwikora Putri; Martini Yuanita Ampera Putri; Meidyawati Banjarina Pelita Pitri

Military service
- Allegiance: Indonesia
- Branch/service: Navy
- Years of service: 1945–1983
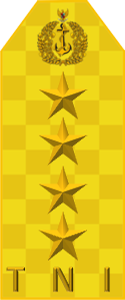
- Rank: Admiral

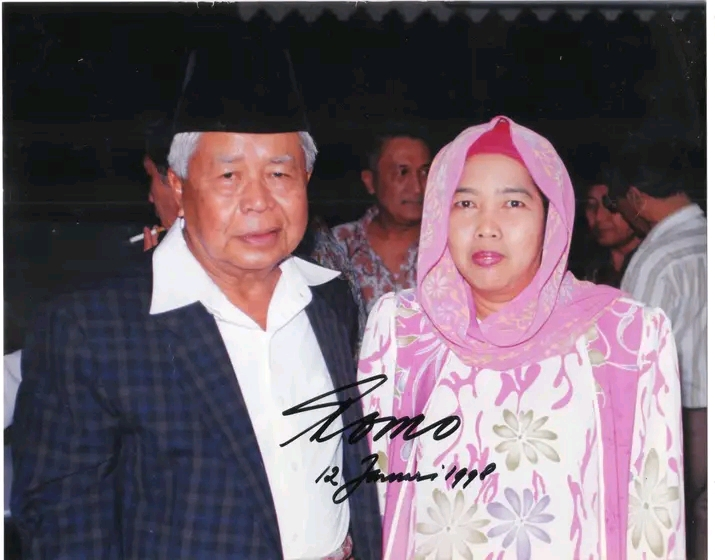
Sudomo photos with Supreme Advisory Council Employees

Muhammad Sudomo, better known as Sudomo (20 September 1926 – 18 April 2012) was a high-ranking Indonesian military official who served in a number of positions during the New Order regime of Indonesian president Suharto. He served as Chief of Staff of the Navy from 1969 until 1973, Commander for Security and Order from 1978 until 1983, Minister of Manpower from 1983 until 1988, Coordinating Ministry for Political and Security Affairs from 1988 until 1993, and Chairman of the Supreme Advisory Council of the Republic of Indonesia from 1993 until 1998.

== Military career ==
In 1945, Sudomo applied and was accepted to the People's Security Army Navy. Since then, he pursuit a carrier in the Indonesian Navy. Within five years, he had been entrusted with the role of patrol boat commander in the Flores and Riau regions, tasked with combating smuggling.

Sudomo got involved in combat operations in Operation Trikora in order to take West Papua from the Netherlands on 19 December 1961. On 15 January 1962, Sudomo engaged in operations involving 3 motor boats, KRI Matjan Tutul, KRI Harimau and KRI Macan Kumbang but their movement was detected by Dutch forces. In the ensuing Battle of Arafura Sea, KRI Matjan Tutul sank along with their captain, Commodore Yos Sudarso. Sudomo survived the battle and was able to return. He reported the loss to Admiral Eddy Martadinata and asked to be reliefed and court martialed for the loss. Martadinata however rejected his request, gave him overall naval command and allowed him to avenge Yos Sudarso.
