= Battle of Arafura Sea =

Naval battle in Western New Guinea

- Part of Operation Trikora
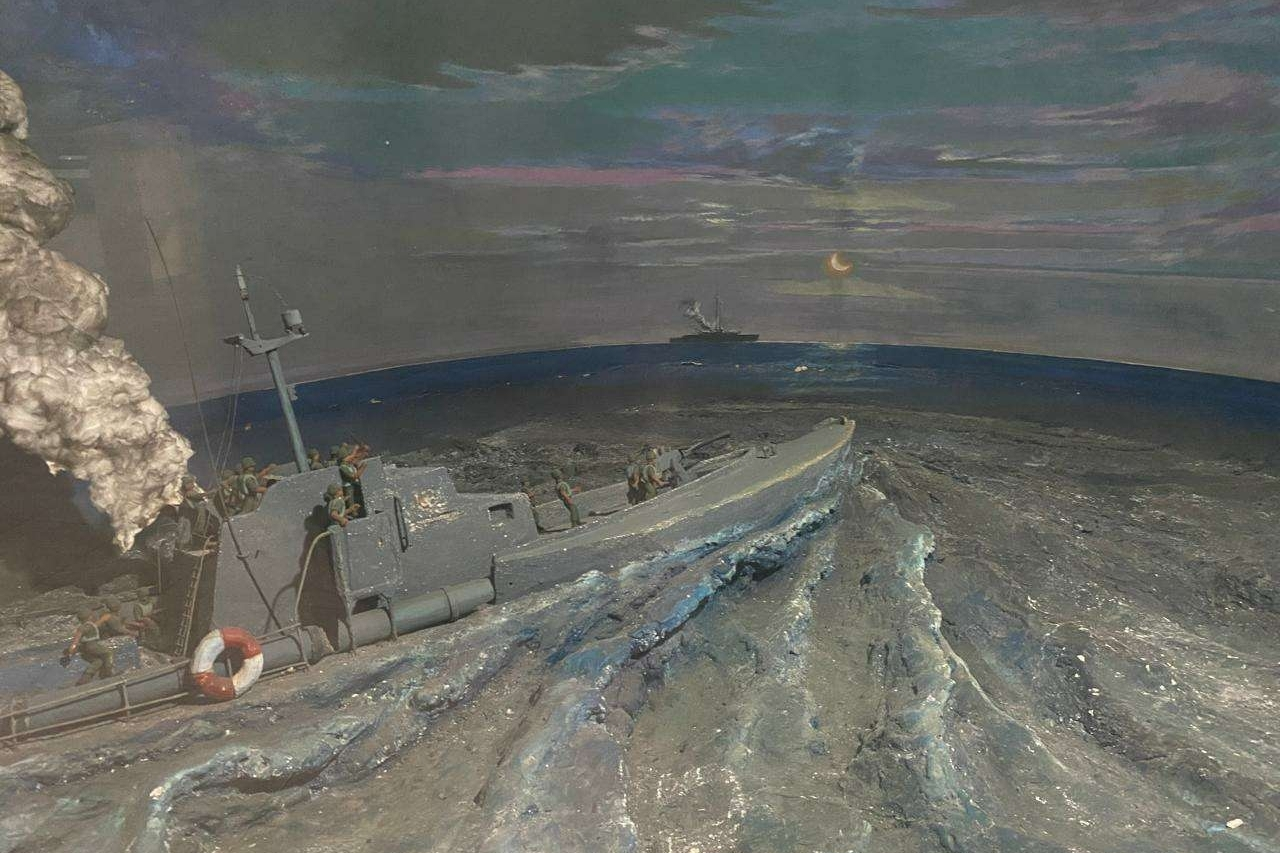
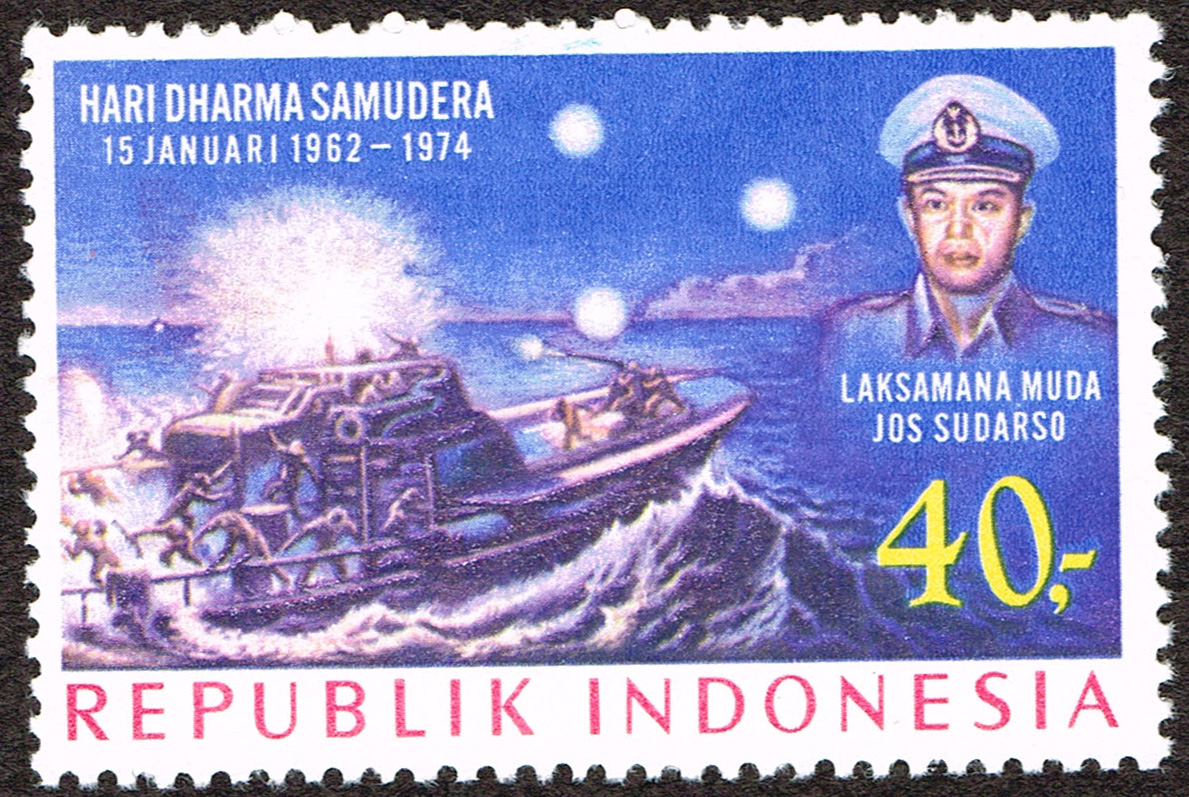
- Diorama depicting the battle Indonesian postage stamp commemorating the battle
Date	15 January 1962
Location	Arafura Sea
Result	Dutch victory

Belligerents
Indonesia	Netherlands

Commanders and leaders
Sudomo; Yos Sudarso †; Wiratno †; Memet Sastrawiria †; Tjiptadi †	L.E.H. Reeser

Units involved
Indonesian Navy	Royal Netherlands Navy

Strength
3 Jaguar-class fast attack craft: RI Matjan Tutul; RI Matjan Kumbang; RI Harimau; Transporting 150 marines	2 S-class destroyers: HNLMS Evertsen; HNLMS Kortenaer; 1 Friesland-class destroyer: HNLMS Utrecht; Supported by a Lockheed P-2 Neptune plane

Casualties and losses
1 torpedo boat sunk 2 torpedo boats disabled 21–39 killed 52–55 captured	None

The Battle of Arafura Sea (Indonesian: Pertempuran Laut Aru), also known as the Battle of Vlakke Hoek (Dutch: Slag bij Vlakke Hoek), was a naval battle in the Arafura Sea near Etna Bay in Western New Guinea on 15 January 1962, between Indonesia and the Netherlands. The battle is commemorated in Indonesia with a national day of remembrance, and the engagement remains the last official naval battle of the Royal Netherlands Navy.

== Background ==
Dutch New Guinea, formerly part of the Dutch East Indies, was excluded from the transfer of sovereignty to Indonesia in 1949, pending a final settlement. This led to a protracted dispute between the Netherlands and Indonesia, culminating in a military confrontation in 1962.

In January of that year, Indonesia intensified its previously initiated infiltrations into the disputed territory, deploying marines by sea. Later, paratroopers were also deployed. The Battle of Arafura Sea marked the beginning of this intensification and formed the first phase of Operation Trikora, the Indonesian plan to take control of Western New Guinea by force. The goal of the infiltrations was to disperse Dutch troops over a large area in pursuit of the intruders. This would weaken the defenses of specific targets—particularly the Dutch naval base on Biak—which the Indonesians intended to attack in the next phase of the operation. Moreover, it was hoped that the infiltrations would destabilize the territory and incite an uprising among the native population, thus putting pressure on the Netherlands.

== Battle ==
On the evening of 15 January 1962, three Indonesian Jaguar-class torpedo boats from Tanjung Priok approached Etna Bay via the Aru Islands, aiming to drop 150 infiltrators at Kaimana for sabotage and to incite the local population against the Dutch administration. Commodore Yos Sudarso was in charge of the naval operation, while Colonel Moersjid was to command the infiltrators upon their landing.

The Dutch maritime intelligence service MARID had anticipated an Indonesian infiltration attempt for weeks and patrolled the area with reconnaissance aircraft. At 9:37 p.m., the Dutch Lockheed P-2 Neptune BIAK-5 reported flying over three boats traveling at high speed near the cape of Vlakke Hoek, on the southern approach to Etna Bay. The order to "illuminate and attack" came from Hollandia, and the aircraft dropped flares and attempted to fire a salvo from its onboard machine gun. The weapon malfunctioned, however, and the torpedo boats responded to the failed attack by firing at the aircraft.

This prompted the Dutch destroyer HNLMS Evertsen to engage the intruders. The torpedo boat RI Matjan Tutul, commanded by Sudarso, was sunk and the torpedo boats RI Matjan Kumbang and RI Harimau fled. Both were disabled as one struck a reef and the other was hit by long-range fire. At least 21 Indonesian personnel were killed, including Commodore Sudarso, but HNLMS Evertsen and HNLMS Kortenaer were able to save up to 55 people from the sea.

== Aftermath ==
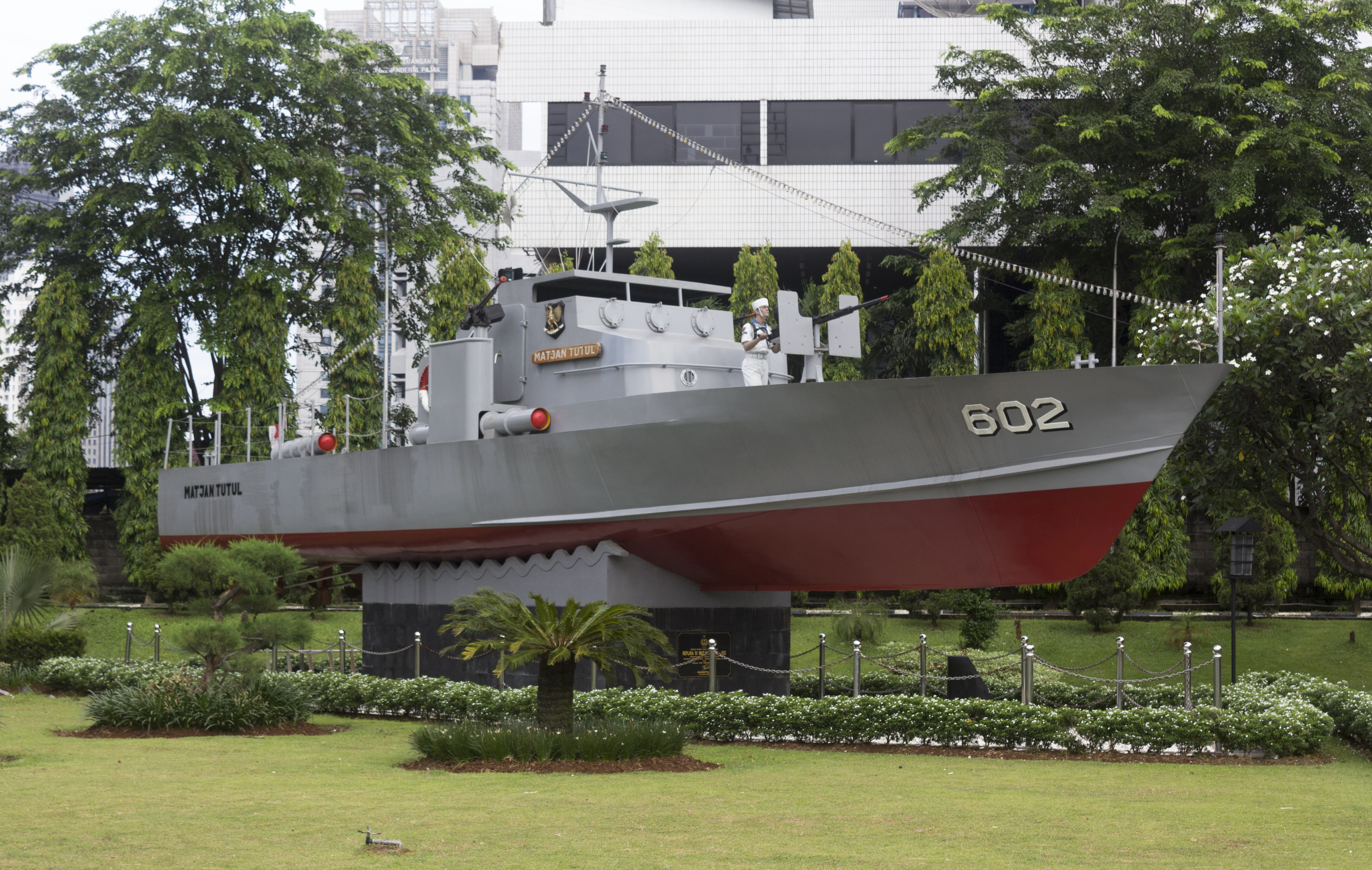
Scaled-down replica of Matjan Tutul at Satriamandala Museum, Jakarta

After the battle, it became clear that the Indonesian torpedo boats had no torpedoes on board and had used the freed-up space to transport naval infantry. Because the Indonesians had fired first after BIAK-5's machine gun failed, the Netherlands could easily dismiss the attack as a reaction to Indonesian aggression. Nevertheless, the Dutch government had started to realize that armed conflict would be inevitable if it continued to refuse to cede the disputed territory to Indonesia.

For the Indonesians, the action was an abject failure and General Nasution even refused to relay the bad news to President Sukarno, forcing Colonel Moersjid to do this in person. However, the small battle was partially responsible for the subsequent involvement of the Soviet Union and United States in the West New Guinea dispute.

== Legacy ==
The battle is commemorated in Indonesia as Ocean Duty Day (Hari Dharma Samudera), which is observed annually as a nationwide day of remembrance. Yos Sudarso was officially recognized as a National Hero twelve years after his death, and Yos Sudarso Island was renamed in his honor. The patrol boat RI Harimau is preserved as a historical artifact at the Purna Bhakti Pertiwi Museum in Taman Mini Indonesia Indah.

The officers who were killed in the battle are honored by the Indonesian Navy through the naming of naval vessels after them. Ships bearing their names are KRI Yos Sudarso, KRI Wiratno, KRI Memet Sastrawiria, and KRI Tjiptadi.
