= Operation Trikora =

1961–1962 Soviet-Indonesian military operation

- Part of the West New Guinea dispute and the Cold War in Asia
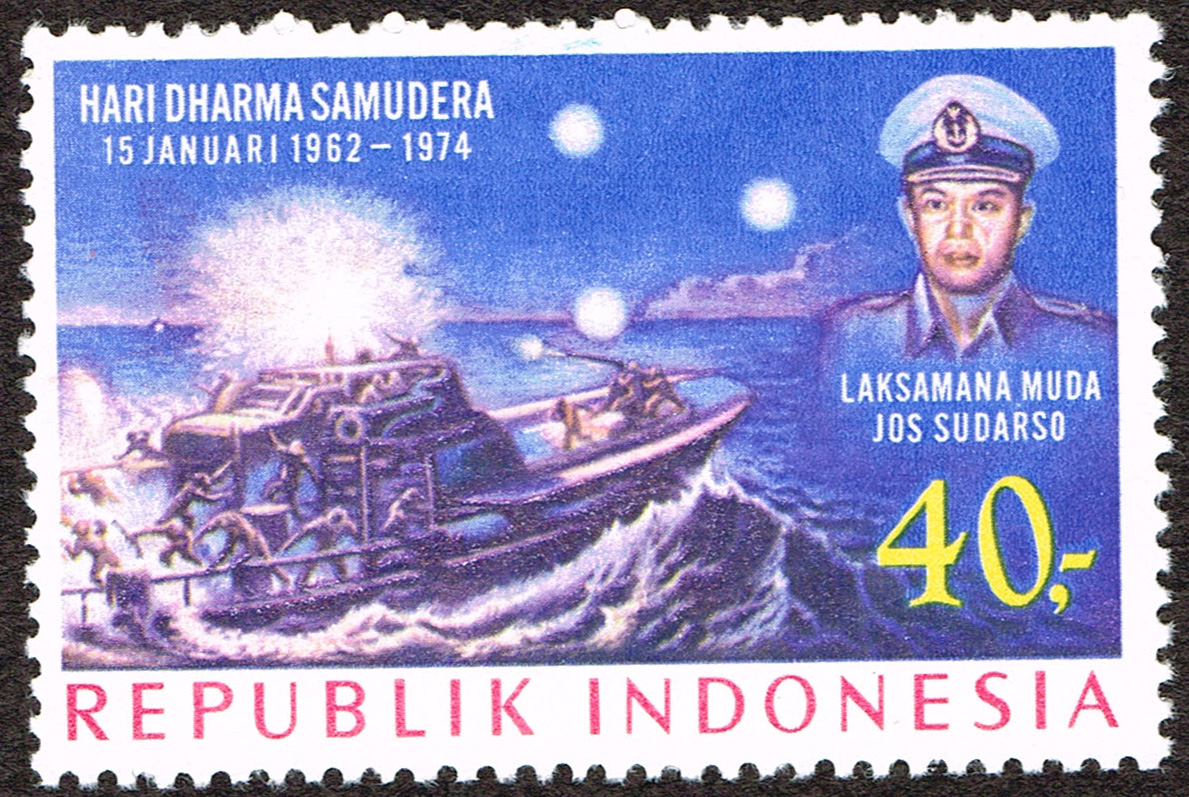
- Indonesian stamp showing KRI Matjan Tutul, the Indonesian torpedo boat sunk in the Battle of Arafura Sea
| Date | 19 December 1961 – 15 August 1962 (7 months, 3 weeks and 6 days) |
| Location | Western New Guinea |
| Result | New York Agreement; Military stalemate; Start of the Papua conflict |
| Territorial changes | Western New Guinea ceded to the United Nations then to Indonesia |

Belligerents
| Indonesia; Soviet Union | Netherlands; Dutch New Guinea |

Commanders and leaders
| (Indonesia) Sukarno; (Indonesia) Soerjadi Soerjadarma; (Indonesia) Abdul Haris Nasution; (Indonesia) Ahmad Yani; (Indonesia) Suharto; (Indonesia) Omar Dhani; (Indonesia) Eddy Martadinata; (Indonesia) Yos Sudarso †; (Indonesia) Leonardus Benjamin Moerdani | (Netherlands) C.J. van Westenbrugge; (Dutch New Guinea) W.A. van Heuven |

Strength
| Indonesia: 13,000 soldiers 7,000 paratroopers 4,500 marines Soviet Union: 1,740 specialists | Netherlands: 10,000 soldiers 1,400 marines 1,000 Papuan volunteers |

Casualties and losses
| 214 dead 1 motor torpedo boat sunk 2 motor torpedo boats damaged | 9 dead |

Operation Trikora (Indonesian: Operasi Trikora, abbreviation of Tri Komando Rakyat) was a combined Soviet–Indonesian military operation which aimed to seize and annex the Dutch overseas territory of New Guinea in 1961 and 1962. After negotiations, the Netherlands signed the New York Agreement with Indonesia on 15 August 1962, relinquishing control of Western New Guinea to the United Nations.

== Background ==
When the rest of the Dutch East Indies became fully independent as Indonesia in December 1949, the Dutch retained sovereignty over the western part of the island of New Guinea during the Dutch–Indonesian Round Table Conference with the method of transfer to be discussed over the next 12 months. Instead, the Dutch wanted to retain Dutch New Guinea. Right-wing politicians wanted that the "Dutch flag remain planted in at least one portion of the former colony" and cited the presence of oil around Sorong. Only when it became certain that the Dutch couldn't keep the territory from Indonesia did they consider taking steps to prepare it for independence as a separate country. The Dutch and some West Papuan leaders argued that the territory did not belong to Indonesia because the West Papuans were ethnically and geographically separated from Indonesians, had always been administered separately, and that the West Papuans did not want to be under Indonesian control. From its independence in 1949 until 1961, Indonesia attempted to gain control of Western New Guinea through the United Nations. The vote reached a majority but not the two-thirds needed for adoption. Since the Indonesian National Revolution, Indonesian nationalists had regarded Western New Guinea as an intrinsic part of the Indonesian state. Though Indonesian nationalists contended that Western New Guinea (Irian Barat) belonged to Indonesia and was being illegally occupied by the Dutch, Indonesia had not presented this argument to the International Court of Justice (ICJ). A further argument was that the Linggadjati Agreement stated that the Dutch were relinquishing the “whole territory of Netherlands (East) Indie" and West Papua was incorporated in Negara Indonesia Timur or NIT and NIT dissolved into the United States of Indonesia which in turn became the Republic of Indonesia, had also not been tended at the ICJ.

Since 1954, Indonesia had sporadically launched military raids into Western New Guinea. Following the failure of negotiations at the United Nations, the president of Indonesia, Sukarno, escalated pressure on the Netherlands by nationalising Dutch-owned businesses and estates and repatriating Dutch nationals. These actions increased tensions between Indonesia and the Netherlands, and led to a sharp reduction in trade between the two countries. Following a sustained period of harassment of Dutch diplomats in Indonesia, Indonesia formally severed ties with the Netherlands in August 1960. Indonesia also increased its military pressure on Dutch New Guinea by buying weapons from the Soviet Union and the Eastern Bloc. Over the following years, the Sukarno government became dependent on Soviet military support.

On 26 September 1961, the Netherlands proposed United Nations administration for which the Netherlands would maintain $30 million annual funding, and proposed a United Nations commission to assess conditions, the public's wishes, and possibility of a United Nations plebiscite.

On 19 December 1961, Sukarno decreed the establishment of the People's Triple Command or Tri Komando Rakyat (Trikora) in order to annex what Indonesia called West Irian by 1 January 1963. Trikora's operational command was to be called the Mandala Command for the Liberation of West Irian (Komando Mandala Pembebasan Irian Barat) with Major-General Suharto (the future President of Indonesia) serving as its commander. In preparation for the planned invasion, the Mandala command began making land, air, and sea incursions into West Irian. As a result, Indonesia began a policy of confronting the Dutch over control of Western New Guinea. Sukarno also embarked on a policy of "progressive mobilization" to prepare the nation to carry out his commands.

While the United States, the United Kingdom and Australia sided with the Netherlands' claims to Western New Guinea and were opposed to Indonesian expansionism, they were unwilling to commit military support to the Dutch. The Netherlands was unable to find sufficient international support for its New Guinea policy. By contrast, Sukarno was able to muster the support of the Soviet Union and its Warsaw Pact allies, and the Non-Aligned Movement. In response to Indonesian claims, the Netherlands sped up the process of implementing West Papuan self-rule from 1959 onward. These measures included the establishment of a legislative New Guinea Council in 1960, establishing hospitals, the completion of a shipyard in Manokwari, development of agricultural research sites and plantations; and the creation of the Papuan Volunteer Corps to defend the territory.

== Trikora ==
On 19 December 1961, President Sukarno made a speech in Yogyakarta regarding the liberation of Papua, revolving around "The three principles of Trikora." The three principles of Trikora were:

1. Prevent The Netherlands from forming a puppet state in West Papua.
2. To fly the Indonesian bicolour (the "red and white") in West Papua.
3. Prepare for mass mobilisation that cover all Indonesians to free West Papua from Dutch imperialism (Note: Some sources claim that the wording of the third command is "Prepare for mass mobilization to protect the independence and unity of the Motherland and Nation," but this exact wording wasn't in Sukarno's speech.)

== Preparation ==
=== Military ===
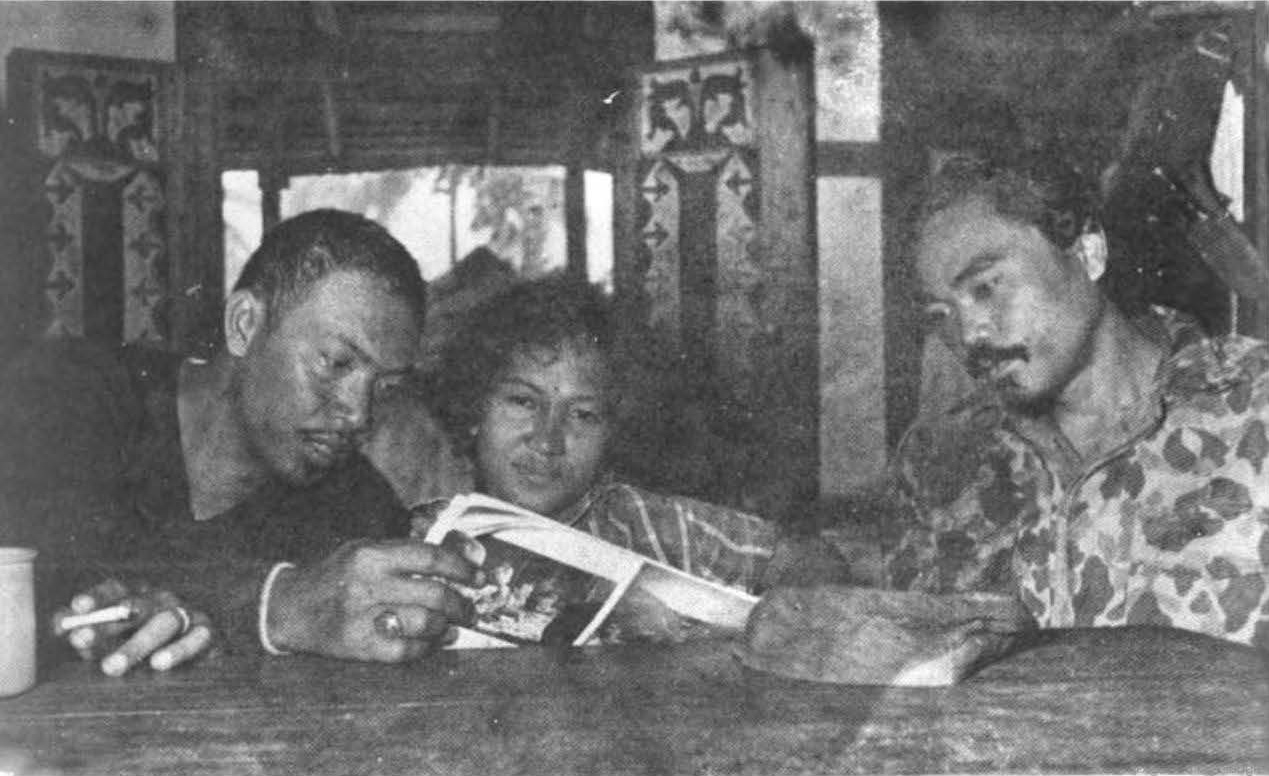
Lieutenant Krisno Djoemar, Commander of Post 103, Herlina Kasim, and Abdul Rachman, former crew members of the KRI Matjan Tutul on Gebe Island.

Indonesia began seeking weapons from abroad in response to the conflict with the Netherlands. Having failed to secure anything from the United States (Dutch membership in NATO was the possible reason), General Nasution went to Moscow in December 1960 to negotiate what eventually turned out to be a US$2.5 billion arms package with the Soviet government. The subsequent deliveries that arose from this deal led the Indonesian National Armed Forces (TNI) to boast that Indonesia had the strongest air force in the southern hemisphere.

The United States did not support the surrender of West Papua to Indonesia, since the Bureau of European Affairs considered it an act of trading one occupying power for another. However, in April 1961, Robert Komer and McGeorge Bundy began to prepare plans for the United Nations to give the impression that surrender to Indonesia was legal. Although reluctantly, President John F. Kennedy finally supported these plans, fearing that, without US support, the Indonesians would become further entrenched into the Soviet-bloc.

Indonesia bought various kinds of military equipment, including 41 Mi-4 and nine Mi-6 helicopters, 30 MiG-15, 49 MiG-17, ten MiG-19 and 20 MiG-21 fighter jets, 12 Whiskey-class submarines, 12 Komar-class missile boats, and one ex-Soviet Navy Sverdlov-class cruiser which was renamed the KRI Irian. Among bombers it bought from the Soviet Union were 22 Ilyushin Il-28 light bombers, 14 Tu-16 long-range medium bombers, and 12 maritime versions of Tu-16 aircraft equipped to launch the AS-1 Kennel anti-ship missiles. The transport aircraft it acquired included 26 IL-14 and Avia-14 light transport aircraft, six Antonov An-12 heavy transports, and ten C-130 Hercules tactical transport aircraft.

=== Airbases ===
To achieve air superiority, the first preparations undertaken by the Indonesian Air Force (AURI) were to repair war-damaged airbases, which would be used for infiltration and conventional operations on the West Irian mainland. Air bases and landing strips which were common along the borders of Maluku and West Irian, were relics of imperial Japanese presence. Such airbases and landing strips were last used in 1945, and had since fallen into disrepair.

=== Soviet involvement ===
Soviet support of Indonesia played a crucial role in ending the conflict over New Guinea. Owing to the support of Soviet submarines and bombers, Indonesian military forces could confidently launch attacks on Dutch troops. In response to the Soviet presence, the United States put pressure on the Netherlands to relinquish control of West Papua. At the height of the Cold War, it was strategically critical that Indonesia remain outside the Soviet sphere of influence, which made the US willing to take action to ensure a neutral or friendly relationship with Indonesia. By enforcing the transfer of New Guinea, the US could keep the Sukarno regime friendly. As the US relinquished support, the Dutch eventually gave way to US pressure and the threat of an extended conflict in New Guinea.

The Soviet support was secret – the "volunteers" wore Indonesian uniforms. However, according to Khrushchev's memoirs, Indonesian Foreign Minister Soebandrio let the Soviet willingness to actively provide military support leak to Howard P. Jones, the US ambassador in Jakarta. Admiral Sudomo revealed in a newspaper article in 2005 that six Soviet submarines supported the amphibious operations while stationed in Bitang, East Sulawesi, tasked to attack the Dutch fleet in Manokwari. Submarine commander Rudolf Ryzhikov recalled in a Russian article he received orders on 29 July from Admiral Sergey Gorshkov to patrol a combat zone west of New Guinea and sink any shipping after midnight on 5 August. Naval officer and Historian Matthijs Ooms has shown in his masterpaper that the Dutch naval intelligence service, MARID (Marine Inlichtingendienst), received information in the summer of 1962 that Soviet crews were manning Indonesian submarines and Tupolev bombers. In his memoirs, Khrushchev freely admitted that during the West New Guinea crisis Soviet personnel had been commanding Indonesian submarines and piloting Tu-16s.

=== Diplomacy ===
In the buildup to the conflict, Indonesia approached key regional players including India, Pakistan, Australia, New Zealand, Thailand, United Kingdom, West-Germany, and France to ensure that they would not support the Netherlands in a potential Dutch-Indonesian conflict. In the United Nations General Assembly in 1961, the UN Secretary General U Thant asked Ellsworth Bunker, a US diplomat, to submit proposals addressing the problem of the status of West Irian. Bunker proposed that the Netherlands cede West Irian to Indonesia through the United Nations within a period of 2 years.

=== Economy ===
On 27 December 1958, President Sukarno issued Law No. 86 of 1958 concerning the nationalization of all Dutch companies in Indonesia. Nationalized companies included:

1. Plantation companies
2. Nederlandsche Handel-Maatschappij
3. Electricity companies
4. Petroleum companies
5. Hospital (CBZ) becomes RSCM

While other policies were implemented, including:

1. Moving the Indonesian tobacco auction market to Bremen, West Germany
2. Dutch workers strike in Indonesia
3. Prohibiting KLM (a Dutch airline) from entering Indonesian airspace
4. Prohibiting the screening of Dutch films

=== General strategy ===
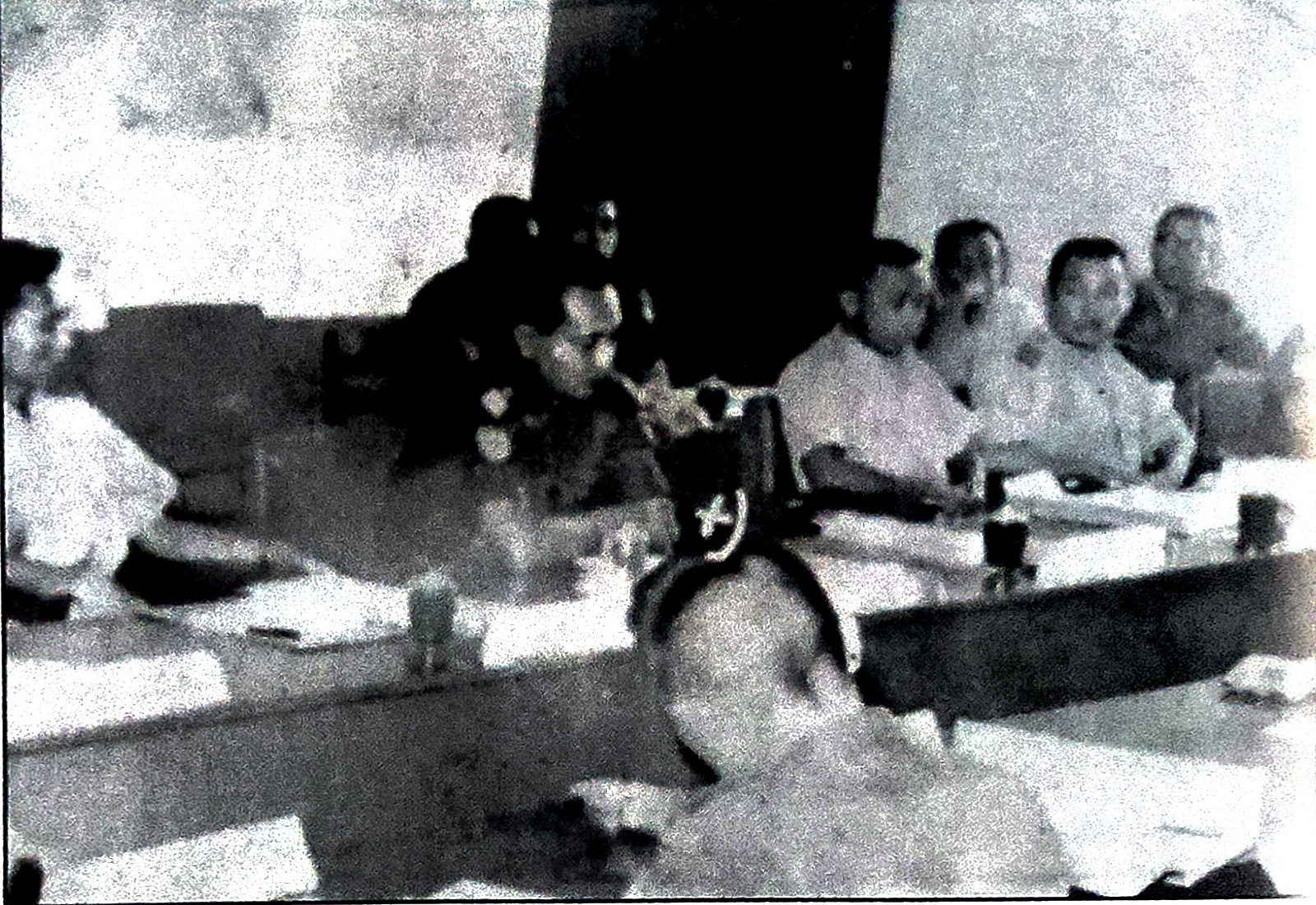
Major General Suharto during a meeting with the Mandala Command

In accordance with the development of the Trikora situation, instructions were given by the Commander in Chief of the Highest Commodity of Liberation of West Irian No. 1 to Major General Suharto, Commanding General of the Mandala Command, which were the following:

- Plan, prepare, and conduct military operations with the aim of unification of West Papua as part of the territory of Indonesia.
- Developing the situation in West Papua in accordance with the struggle in the field of diplomacy and in the shortest possible time in this region creating de facto regions of Indonesian control.

Strategies developed by the CGMC to carry out these instructions included the following:

- Infiltration (until the end 1962), namely by deploying infantry units around certain targets to create a strong de facto free area that is resistant to destruction by the enemy and to develop territorial control by unifying the local populace.
- Exploitation (early 1963), namely carrying out an open attack on enemy forces and occupying all important enemy defense posts.
- Consolidation (early 1964), namely by demonstrating the power and absolute sovereignty of the Republic of Indonesia throughout West Papua

== Indonesian military operations ==
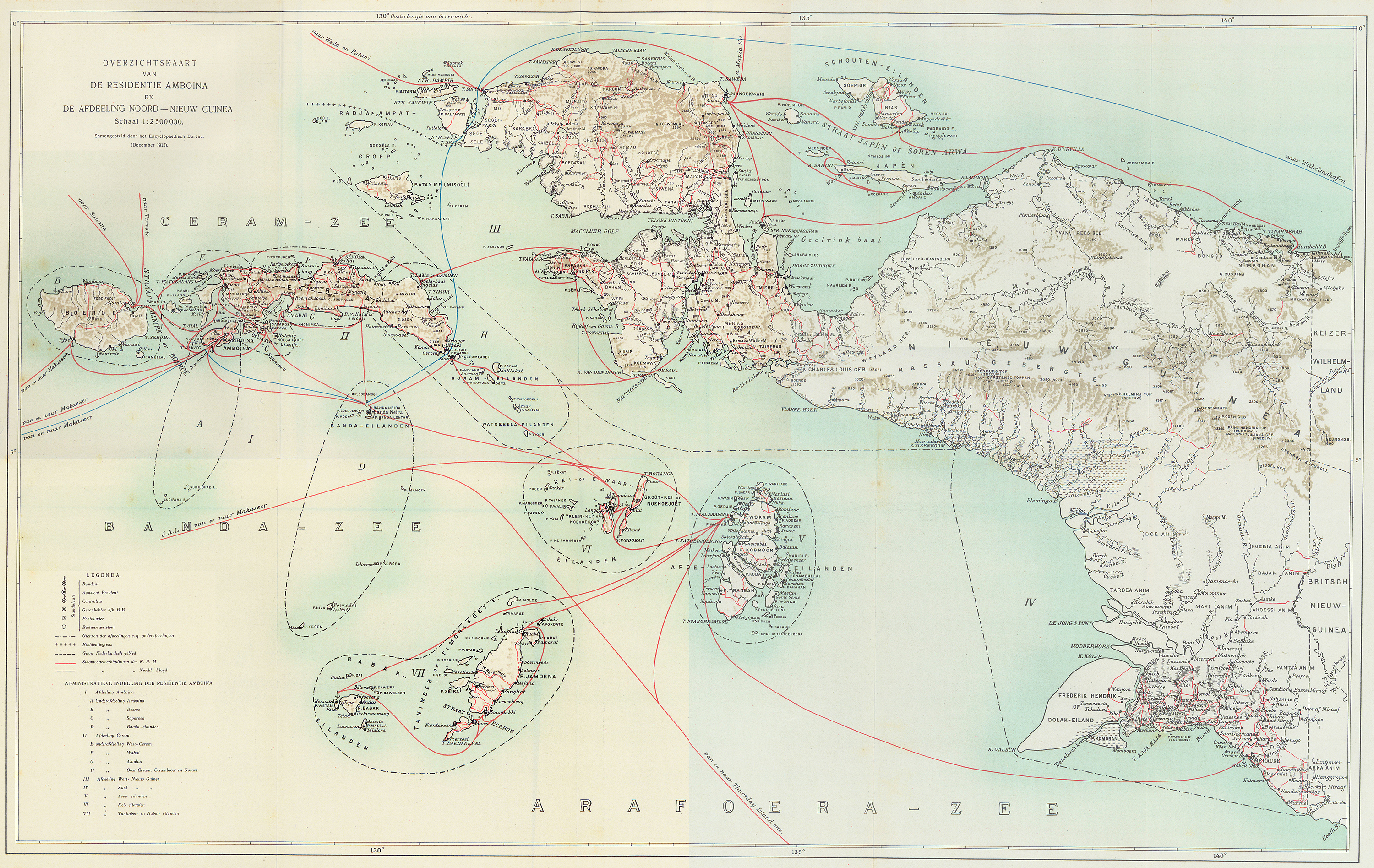
The disputed territory of West New Guinea

In 1962, Indonesian incursions into the territory in the form of paratroop drops and the naval landings of guerrillas were used to step up Indonesian Foreign Minister Subandrio's diplomatic confrontation with the Dutch. Operation Trikora was to unfold in three phases: infiltration, exploitation and consolidation, all under cover of the Indonesian Air Force. The plan called first for the insertion of small bands of Indonesian troops by sea and by airdrop, who would then draw Dutch forces away from areas where the exploitation phase would stage full-scale amphibious landings and paratroop operations to seize key locations. The consolidation phase would then expand Indonesian control over the whole of Western New Guinea.

On 15 January 1962, the infiltration phase of Operation Trikora began when four Indonesian Navy motor torpedo boats attempted to land a unit of 150 marines on the south coast of New Guinea near Vlakke Hoek. The force was detected by a Dutch Lockheed P2V-7B Neptune aircraft and the Indonesian boats were intercepted by three Dutch destroyers. During the subsequent Battle of Arafura Sea, one Indonesian boat was sunk and two others were badly damaged and forced to retreat. Thus, this planned Indonesian amphibious landing ended disastrously with many crew members and marines being killed, among them Commodore Yos Sudarso, the Deputy Chief of the Indonesian Navy Staff. Some 55 survivors were captured. Over the next eight months, the Indonesian forces managed to insert 562 troops by sea and 1,154 by air drops. The inserted Indonesian troops conducted guerrilla operations throughout Western New Guinea from April 1962 onwards, but they were largely militarily ineffective. At least 94 Indonesian soldiers were killed and 73 were wounded during the hostilities. By contrast, the Dutch suffered only minimal casualties.

Indonesian military activity continued to increase in the area through mid-1962 in preparation for the second phase of the operation. The Indonesian Air Force began to fly missions in the area from bases on surrounding islands, with Soviet-supplied Tupolev Tu-16 bombers armed with KS-1 Komet anti-ship missiles deployed in anticipation of an attack against the HNLMS Karel Doorman.

By the summer of 1962, the Indonesian military had begun planning a large-scale amphibious and air assault against Biak, the Netherlands' main power base in West Irian. This operation would have been known as Operation Jayawijaya ("Victory over Imperialism") and would have included a substantial task force of 60 ships including several which had been supplied by Sukarno's Soviet and Eastern Bloc allies. On 13 and 14 August 1962, air drops of Indonesian troops were staged from Sorong in the northwest to Merauke in the southeast as a diversion for an amphibious assault against the Dutch military base at Biak by a force of 7,000 Army (RPKAD) and Air Force (PASGAT) paratroopers, 4,500 marines and 13,000 army servicemen, from various military districts (KODAMs). However, the Dutch Navy's Marid 6 Netherlands New Guinea (Marid 6 NNG) signals intelligence section and Neptune aircraft detected the invasion force and alerted their command.

According to Wies Platje, the Royal Netherlands Navy was responsible for the defence of Western New Guinea. In 1962, the Dutch naval presence in New Guinea consisted of five anti-submarine destroyers, two frigates, three submarines, one survey vessel, one supply ship and two oil tankers. Dutch air power in Western New Guinea consisted of 11 Lockheed P2V-7B Neptune aircraft from the Dutch Navy plus 24 Hawker Hunter jet fighters from the Royal Netherlands Air Force. In addition, Dutch ground forces consisted of several anti-aircraft artillery units, five Netherlands Marine Corps companies and three Royal Netherlands Army infantry battalions. As part of the planned defence, the Dutch had considered using Marid 6 NNG to disrupt the Indonesian military's communication systems.

=== Infiltration from Post 101 Hanggodo ===
On 23 March 1962, infiltration began using 3 boats, one of them motorised, and carry PG 600. PG 600 was led by Maksum with Ki R/XV under the leadership of Lt. Nussy. They travelled from Ujir and Karwai to S. Jera. a unit consisted of 24 members under the leadership of Octavianus Marani was able land, although the parent force was forced to return because was sighted by Neptune plane. They are able to return except 7 members on board the vessel "Ho Sing Sang" which was shot by Dutch forces and presumed lost between Etna Bay and Watu Belah Islands.

=== Infiltration from Post 102 Kapi Jembawan ===
Units sent from this post, were tasked to collect intelligence. There were 5 failed attempts although on 13 May 1962 a unit consisted of 20 people from Brimob was able to arrive although promptly captured by Dutch Navy before they were able to land. On 7 August 1962 63 people consisted of 53 from Brimob and 10 volunteers managed to land in Rumbati near Patipi, Fakfak.

=== Infiltration from Post 103 Hanilo ===
On 18 March 1962 at 15.15 from this post, on Gebe island, PG 300 consisted of 2 platoons and Command Company 191261, under the leadership of Lt. Nana attempt an infiltration to Waigeo. They were sighted by Dutch reconnaissance plane, and therefore was forced to land on Gag island, west of Waigeo. PG 300 was isolated and assaulted by Dutch forces. On 25 March 1962, Indonesian Air force B-25 Mitchells (tail number M-434) engaged a Dutch Navy ship off Gag Island, setting the ship on fire. On 26 March 1962, Dutch forces landed in Gag island. The fighting from both forces lasted for a month. On 15 April 1962, Dutch forces began another sweeping operation on the island, however some PG 300 forces was able to move to the interior and to other coastal areas. Around 29 Gag islanders joined with PG 300 forces.

On 20 April 1962, 2 platoons 191260 PG 300 under the command of Sergeant Major Boy Thomas travelled from Yu island to Tanjung Dalpele on Waigeo. They were sighted by Dutch reconnaissance plane, and therefore took refuge in Bala-Bala island for 2 hours before landed safely in Tanjung Dalpele.

On 15 July 1962, PG 500 under the command of Jonkey Robert Komontoy, consisted of 87 people travelled from Gebe island to Waigeo. In Waigeo they met up with forces under Herlina Kasim which was a false flag unit. These 2 forces joined and enter Arugu Bay, northwest of Sorong. PG 500 enter Sausapor on 17 July 1962. Previous successful infiltration by PG 400 consisted of 200 people. This group movement was covered by Herlina forces on 12 August 1962. In Waigeo, Indonesian soldiers did not encounter Dutch forces as they rarely visited the island.

=== Infiltration from Post Wahai ===
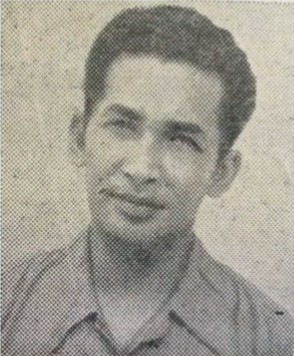
Lt. Thomas Nussy, former KST and Chief of Staff of APRMS, who later participated in Operation Trikora.

After the failed infiltration from Post 101, on 9 August 1962, Raider Corps Kodam XV under the leadership of Lt. Nussy landed in Misool. Another forces from Wahai on 11 August 1962 consisted of 46 members was forced to return after meeting a Dutch Navy destroyer. However, after escorts from 5 Motorised Torpedo Boats (MTB), they were able to land on 12 August 1962. Those 5 MTB were engaged with Dutch forces consisted of 1 frigate, 1 destroyer, 1 submarine, and 1 Neptune, however managed to return safely.

=== Operation Banteng ===
This operation was done by of paratroopers from PGT and RPKAD with the target of Kaimana and Fakfak. Based on those 2 objectives this operation consisted of 2 operation.

Operasi Banteng Putih, under the leadership of Air Major Nayoan, with the target of Fakfak. This unit consisted of 40 members, led by Lettu Agus Hernoto. The drop was on 26 April 1962, at 04.00, using 3 Douglas C-47 Skytrain planes.

Operasi Banteng Merah, under the leadership of Air Captain Santoso, with the target of Kaimana. This unit consisted of 39 members, led by Lettu Heru Sinodo. The drop was on 26 May 1962, at 05.00, using 3 C-47 planes.

=== Operation Garuda ===
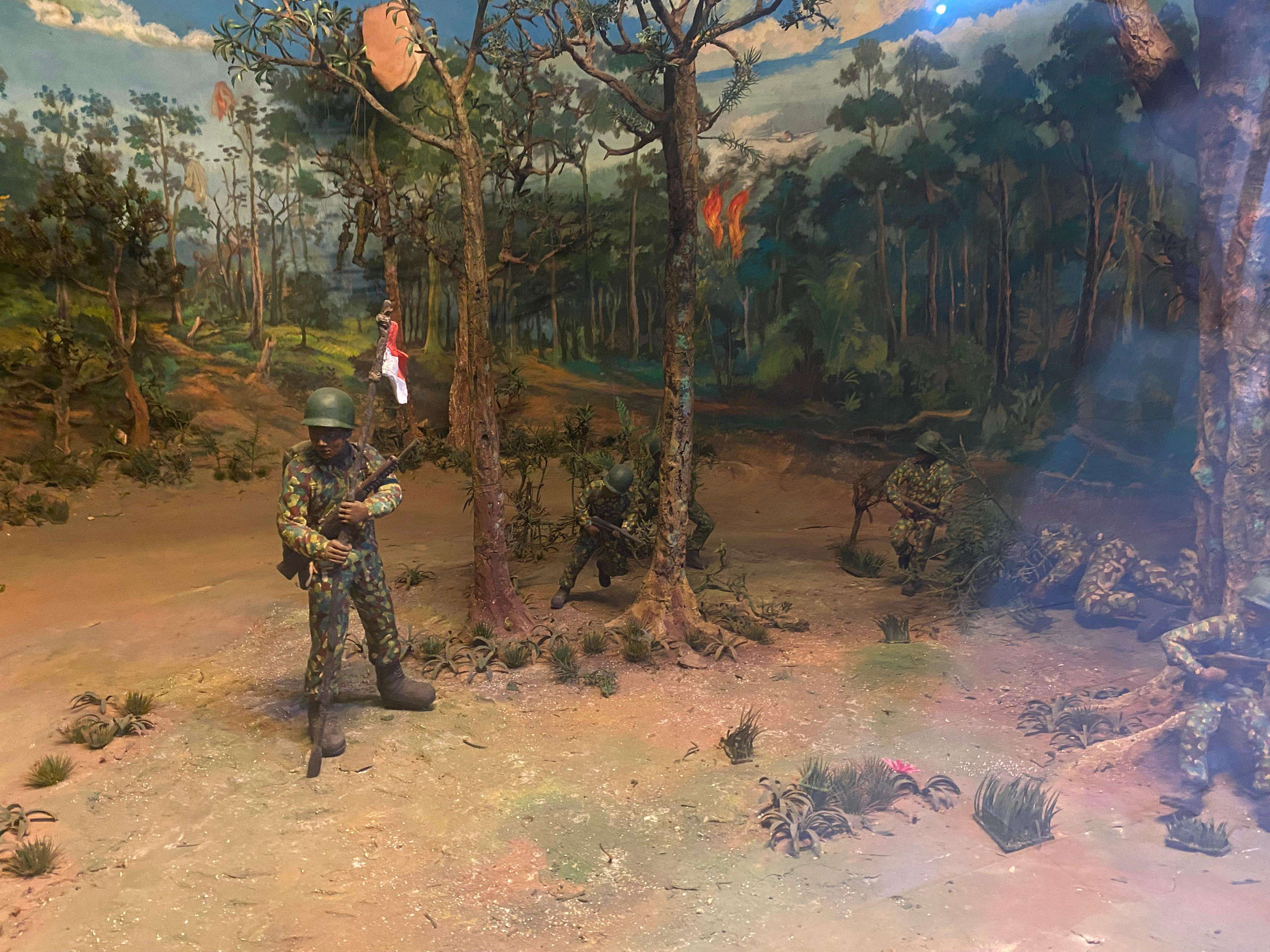
Diorama of Indonesian Paratroopers landing on Fakfak during Operation Garuda

Two battalions of Raiders Yon 454/Diponegoro and PGT members joined for this operation. This force was split into 2:

Garuda Merah, consisted of 140 members led by Captain Kartawi with the target Fakfak. The first drop was on 15 May 1962, consisting of 40 people. The second drop was on 16 May 1962, consisting of 38 people.

Garuda Putih, consisted of 122 members led by Lettu Idris with the target Kaimana. The first drop was on 15 May 1962, consisting of 27 people. On this drop a C-47 plane was shot down on the way home. As a result, on second drop, this operation used the larger Hercules plane. On 19 May 1962 at 04.00 the second drop consisted of 79 people. On 26 May 1962, the third drop consisted of 68 people.

=== Operation Serigala ===
The units from this operation consisted from members of PGT with the target of Sorong regions and the surrounding. This operation is split into 2 steps.

On 17 May 1962, with a C-47 plane, a drop was performed on Teminabuan consisted of 39 people under the leadership of Air Lt. Lambertus Manuhua. They landed in Dutch military barracks, the fighting began immediately for several days before Indonesian forces managed to take over on 21 May 1962, and fly the Indonesian flag on the compound.

On 19 May 1962, with a Hercules plane, a drop was performed on Sansapor with forces consisted of 81 people under the leadership of second Lt. Suhadi. They landed on Dutch military barracks, the fighting ended quickly, as Dutch forces suffered a loss of morale.

=== Operation Naga ===
A successful paratrooper operation occurred on 24 June 1962, with the target Merauke using 3 Hercules planes. This operation consisted of 55 members of special forces, and 160 members of Battalion 530/Brawijaya under the command of Major Leonardus Benjamin Moerdani. A moderately successful guerrilla operation by these forces, forced the Dutch to send reinforcements to bolster Merauke forces from two corps to two battalions.

=== Operation Badar Lumut and Badar Besi ===
Operation Badar Lumut was trained in Tual (Post 101) with forces from Battalion 521/Brawijaya. They were planned to land on Kaimana, however, the operation was not started because of higher Dutch patrol intensity on the coast.

Operation Badar Besi was planned in conjunction based in Post 103 with forces from Battalion 515/Brawijaya. Although same with the previous operation was not started yet.

=== Operation Lumba-Lumba ===
This infiltration operation was planned on using 3 submarines to land 45 servicemen under the leadership of First Lt. Dolf Latumahina on regions surrounding Jayapura. In this operation, one submarine managed to land forces in Tanah Merah. The other two submarines did not manage to land forces after the operation was paused, after cessation of hostilities. All submarines managed to land safely back to base. The successful infiltrators managed to made contact with Marthen Indey, and Elly Uyo.

=== Operation Lumbung ===
This operation was commenced on 30 June 1962 intended to supply infiltration forces that had successfully landed (Operation Naga) in Merauke, New Guinea, using a Hercules plane.

=== Operation Jatayu ===
This operation consisted of three operations, Operation Elang landed 132 airborne forces consisting of PGT in Klamono-Sorong, Operation Gagak landed 141 airborne forces from Yon-454 in Kaimana, and Operation Alap-alap landed 132 PGT forces in Merauke from Bandung.

== Aftermath ==
On 15 August 1962, the Netherlands recognized Indonesia's resolve to take Western New Guinea. Since it was unwilling to be drawn into a protracted conflict on the other side of the world, the Dutch government signed the New York Agreement, which handed the colony to an interim United Nations administration. Consequently, Operation Jayawijaya was called off and Western New Guinea was officially acquired by Indonesia in 1963. The Dutch decision to hand over Western New Guinea to Indonesia had been influenced by its main ally, the United States. While the Netherlands was a member of the North Atlantic Treaty Organization (NATO) and thus an ally of the US, the Kennedy administration was unwilling to antagonize Indonesia since it was trying to court President Sukarno away from the Soviet orbit. The Indonesian military's incursions into West Irian, plus the substantial Soviet military assistance to the Indonesian military, had convinced the United States government to pressure the Dutch to seek a peaceful solution to the conflict.

The New York Agreement was the result of negotiations led by the US diplomat Ellsworth Bunker. As a face-saving measure for the Dutch, Bunker arranged for a Dutch-Indonesian ceasefire which would be followed by the handover of Western New Guinea on 1 October 1962 to a temporary United Nations Temporary Executive Authority (UNTEA). On 1 May 1963, Indonesia formally annexed Western New Guinea. As part of the New York Agreement, it was stipulated that a popular plebiscite, called the Act of Free Choice, would be held in 1969 to determine whether the West Papuans would choose to remain in Indonesia or seek self-determination. However, US efforts to win over Sukarno proved futile and Indonesia turned its attention to the former British colony of Malaysia, resulting in the Indonesian-Malaysian Confrontation. Ultimately, President Sukarno was overthrown during the Indonesian coup d'état in 1965 and was replaced by the pro-Western Suharto. The US mining company Freeport-McMoRan began exploiting Western New Guinea's copper and gold deposits.

After the Act of Free Choice plebiscite in 1969, West Irian was formally integrated into the Republic of Indonesia. While several international observers including journalists and diplomats criticized the referendum as being rigged, the United States and Australia supported Indonesia's efforts to secure acceptance in the United Nations for the pro-integration vote. In all, 84 member states voted in favor for the United Nations to accept the result, with 30 others abstaining. Due to the Netherlands' efforts to promote a West Papuan national identity, a significant number of West Papuans refused to accept the territory's integration into Indonesia. These formed the separatist Organisasi Papua Merdeka (Free Papua Movement) and have waged an insurgency against the Indonesian authorities, which continues to this day.

== Legacy ==
Many monuments and places are dedicated to the Trikora command, and subsequently the operation itself. Numerous monuments were built, notably the two in Jakarta (West Irian Liberation Monument in Central Jakarta and Trikora Monument inside TNI headquarters in East Jakarta), Mandala Command for West Irian Liberation Monument in Makassar, South Sulawesi, and Jayawijaya Monument in Banggai Islands Regency, Central Sulawesi, as well as Trikora monuments in Bitung, North Sulawesi, Morotai Regency, North Maluku, and Ambon, Maluku. Monuments alco commemorate paratroopers involved in Operation Trikora, such as a statue in Teminabuan, South Sorong Regency and Fakfak Regency, West Papua as well as statue of L.B. Moerdani as a paratrooper in Merauke Regency, South Papua.

A short main street located north of Northern Alun-alun in Yogyakarta, Special Region of Yogyakarta was previously named Jalan Trikora (Trikora Street) before being renamed Jalan Pangurakan. Other roads in several Indonesian cities, particularly in Papua and West Papua, are also named after the operation as well. Another place named after the operation is Trikora Peak in Papua highlands.

== See also ==
- Dutch New Guinea
- West New Guinea dispute
