= KRI Matjan Tutul =

Indonesian fast attack craft

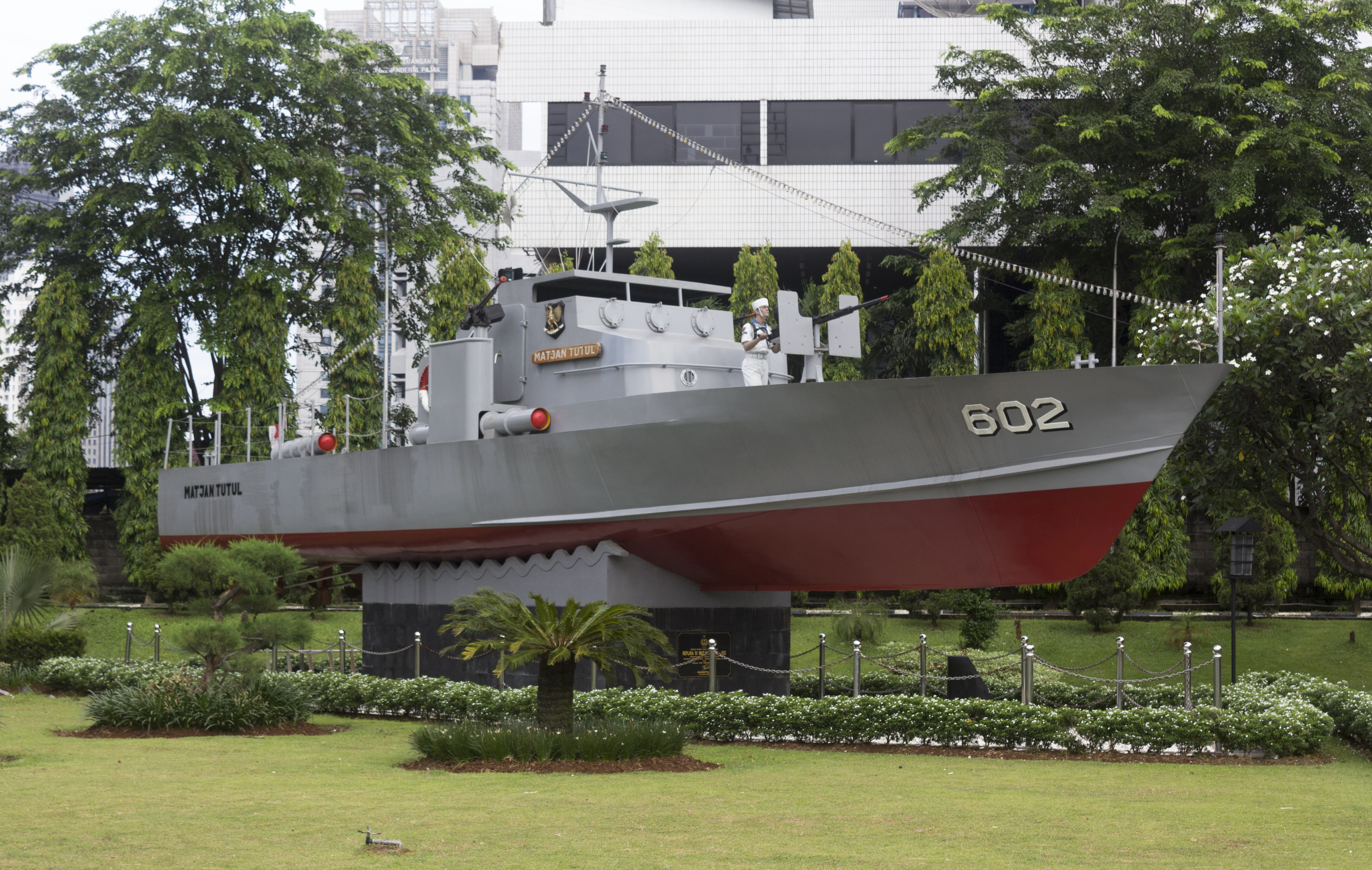
- Scaled down replica of KRI Matjan Tutul at Satriamandala Museum

Indonesia
- Name: Matjan Tutul
- Namesake: Leopard
- Builder: Lürssen, Bremen-Vegesack
- Acquired: 1960
- Commissioned: 1961
- Identification: 602
- Fate: Sunk on 15 January 1962 during the Battle of the Arafura Sea

General characteristics
- Class & type: Jaguar-class fast attack craft
- Displacement: 183.4 t (180.5 long tons) standard; 210 t (210 long tons) full load
- Length: 42.60 m (139 ft 9 in)
- Beam: 7.10 m (23 ft 4 in)
- Draught: 2.30 m (7 ft 7 in)
- Propulsion: 4 Mercedes-Benz MB 518 B diesel engines, 3000 PS each; 4 propeller shafts, driving three-bladed propellers of 1.15 m (3 ft 9 in) diameter; Bunker: 25t fuel, 1.12t lubricants, 2t fresh water
- Speed: 42 knots (78 km/h; 48 mph) max; 39 knots (72 km/h; 45 mph) max sustained
- Range: 700 nmi (1,300 km; 810 mi) at 35 knots (65 km/h; 40 mph)
- Complement: 39 officers and enlisted
- Sensors & processing systems: Navigation radar, surveillance radar
- Armament: 2 Bofors 40 mm/70 Model 1958 guns, 3168 rounds of ammunition; 4 533 mm torpedo tubes; Minelaying capabilities: The aft 2 torpedo tubes can be supplemented with 2 ramps for 23 naval mines Mk 12; 14 depth charges *2 Bofors 40 mm/70 Model 1958 guns, 3168 rounds of ammunition; 4 533 mm torpedo tubes; Minelaying capabilities: The aft 2 torpedo tubes can be supplemented with 2 ramps for 23 naval mines Mk 12; 14 depth charges

KRI Matjan Tutul was one of eight Jaguar-class torpedo boats operated by the Indonesian Navy, that were built in West Germany in the 1960s. The vessel played an important role during the Battle of Arafura Sea, one of several battles during Operation Trikora.

== Design ==
Matjan Tutul was part of the second batch of Jaguar-class fast attack craft (FAC) ordered by Indonesia from West Germany in late 1950s, which has steel hull instead of the wooden hull on the first batch. Matjan Tutul was crewed by a complement of 39, including 4 officers, 2 cooks, 17 engine room personnel, and 18 sailors.

Matjan Tutul measured 42.6 metres (139 ft 9 in) in length with a beam of 7.1 metres (23 ft 4 in) with a displacement of 183.4 tonnes (180.5 long tons) and a sleek design, Matjan Tutul embodied both power and agility. Despite its simple appearance, the ship proved formidable and swift. It was powered by four Mercedes-Benz MB51B diesel engines producing 3,000 horsepower (2,200 kW). True to its designation as a fast attack craft, it could reach speeds, propelled by four 1.15-metre (3 ft 9 in)-diameter propellers, enabling the ship to sail at a maximum speed of 42 knots (78 km/h; 48 mph).

=== Weaponry ===
Matjan Tutul was equipped with various weaponry including two Bofors 40-millimetre (1.6 in) guns mounted on both the bow and stern, and was supposed to be equipped with four 533 mm (21.0 in) torpedo tubes, with two mounted on each side of the vessel. However, due to the restrictions imposed on West Germany as part of their agreement with the Allies, they were prohibited from producing torpedoes.

The Indonesian government then planned to acquire the MK 3 torpedoes from the United Kingdom. However, due to the United Kingdom's alliance with the Netherlands, which was opposed to Indonesia's independence, they refused to sell the torpedoes to Indonesia. As a result, Indonesia then ordered torpedoes from the Soviet Union. However, when Operation Trikora was declared, the weaponry had not yet arrived in Indonesia. Despite this, the Jaguar-class torpedo boats, including Matjan Tutul, were still prepared and deployed for infiltration missions.

== Service history ==
Matjan Tutul was one of the eight Jaguar-class fast attack craft ordered by Indonesia from West German shipbuilder Lürssen in Bremen-Vegesack in late 1950s and was built in 1959–1960. By 1961 two of the eight FACs purchased had participated in naval combat exercises; Matjan Tutul and KRI Adjak.

=== Battle and sinking ===
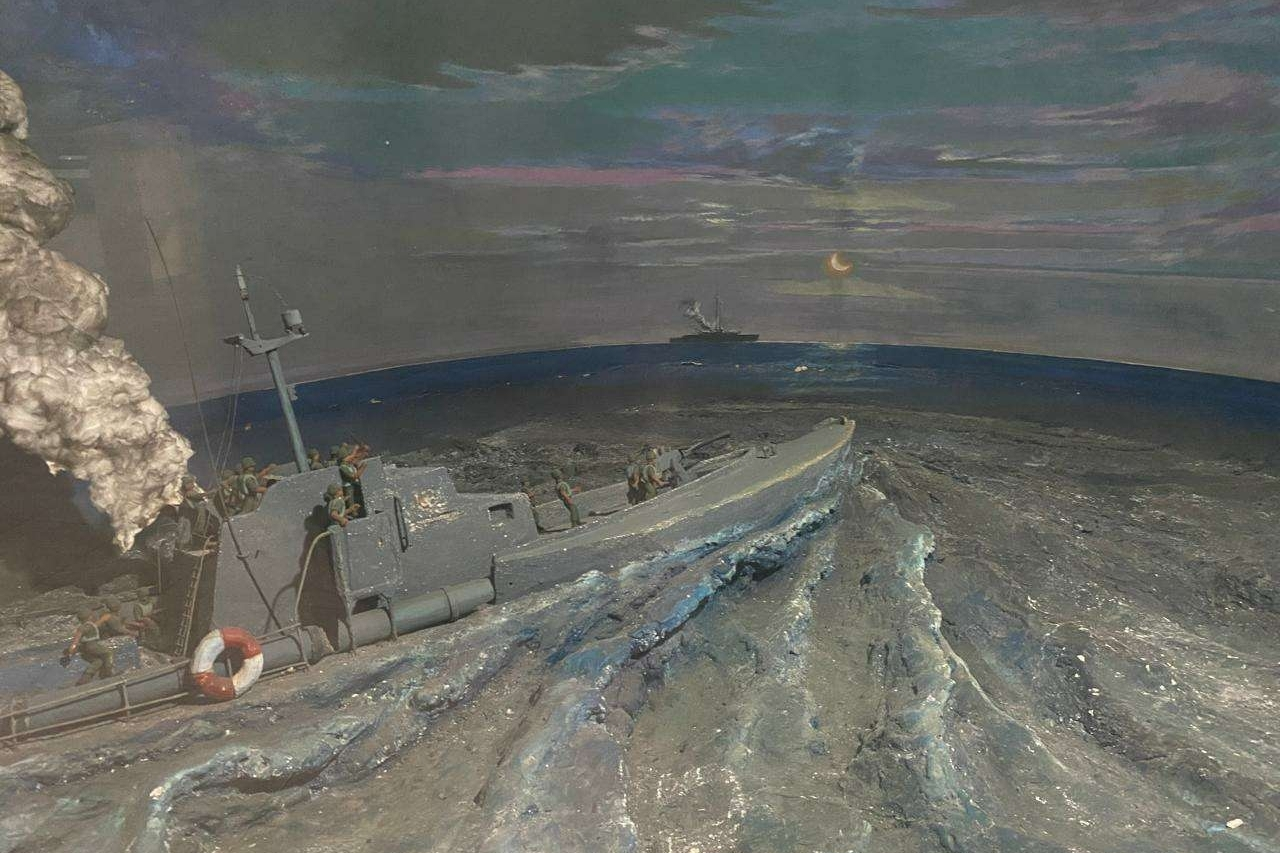
Diorama depicting KRI Matjan Tutul during the battle

The Battle of Arafura Sea on 15 January 1962 occurred when two Dutch destroyers, along with Neptune and Firefly aircraft, attacked the Indonesian Navy's KRI Macan Tutul, KRI Matjan Kumbang, and KRI Harimau. The Indonesian fleet, led by Commodore Yos Sudarso aboard Matjan Tutul, maneuvered to divert the enemy's attention. As a result, the Dutch forces focused their attack on Matjan Tutul. Soon after, the assault caused Matjan Tutul to sink. At least three sailors died among whom was Commodore Sudarso, while the other two Indonesian vessels managed to escape undamaged.
