= HMS Scourge (G01) =

Destroyer of the Royal Navy

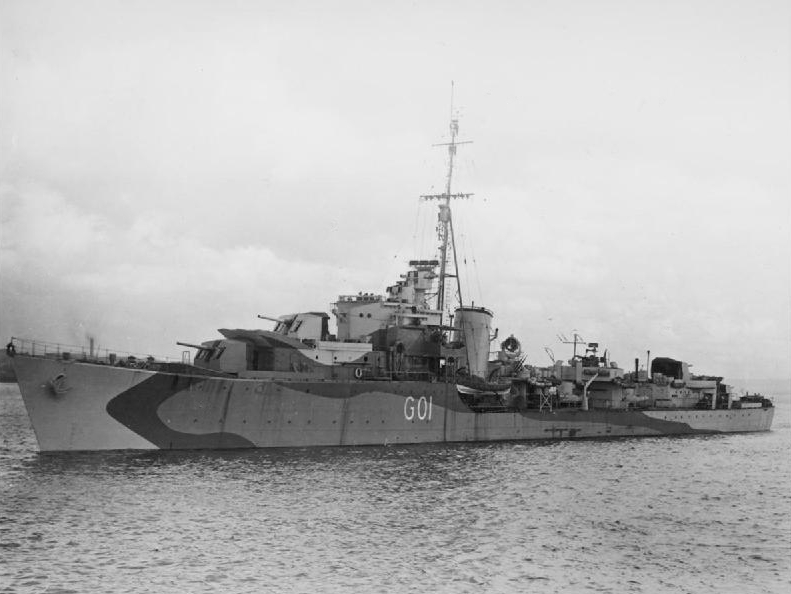
- HMS Scourge (G01) in 1943

History

United Kingdom
- Name: HMS Scourge
- Ordered: 9 January 1941
- Builder: Cammell Laird, Birkenhead
- Laid down: 26 June 1941
- Launched: 8 December 1942
- Commissioned: 14 July 1943
- Out of service: Sold to the Royal Netherlands Navy on 1 February 1946
- Identification: Pennant number: G01
- Honours and awards: Arctic 1943-45; Normandy 1944
- Badge: On a Field White. a cat-o-nine tails proper

Netherlands
- Name: HNLMS Evertsen
- Acquired: 1 February 1946
- Identification: D802
- Fate: Scrapped from July 1963

General characteristics
- Class & type: S-class destroyer
- Displacement: 1,710 long tons (1,740 t) (standard); 2,530 long tons (2,570 t) (deep load)
- Length: 362 ft 9 in (110.6 m) (o/a)
- Beam: 35 ft 9 in (10.9 m)
- Draught: 14 ft 6 in (4.4 m) (deep)
- Installed power: 40,000 shp (30,000 kW); 2 × Admiralty 3-drum boilers
- Propulsion: 2 × shafts; 2 × Parsons geared steam turbines
- Speed: 36 knots (67 km/h; 41 mph)
- Range: 4,675 nmi (8,658 km; 5,380 mi) at 20 knots (37 km/h; 23 mph)
- Complement: 170
- Sensors & processing systems: Radar Type 290 air warning; Radar Type 285 ranging & bearing
- Armament: 4 × single 4.7-inch (120 mm) Mark XII dual-purpose guns; 1 × twin Bofors 40 mm AA guns; 4 × twin QF 20 mm Oerlikon AA guns; 2 × quadruple 21-inch torpedo tubes; 4 × throwers and 2 × racks for 70 depth charges

HMS Scourge was an S-class destroyer built for the Royal Navy during the Second World War. The ship was sold to the Netherlands postwar, where she saw action in the Korean War and the West New Guinea dispute.

== Description ==
Scourge displaced 1,710 long tons (1,740 t) at standard load and 2,530 long tons (2,570 t) at deep load. She had an overall length of 362 feet 9 inches (110.6 m), a beam of 35 feet 8 inches (10.9 m) and a deep draught of 14 feet 6 inches (4.4 m). She was powered by two Parsons geared steam turbines, each driving one propeller shaft, using steam provided by two Admiralty three-drum boilers. The turbines developed a total of 40,000 shaft horsepower (30,000 kW) and gave a maximum speed of 36 knots (67 km/h; 41 mph). Scourge carried a maximum of 615 long tons (625 t) of fuel oil that gave her a range of 4,675 nautical miles (8,658 km; 5,380 mi) at 20 knots (37 km/h; 23 mph). Her complement was 170 officers and ratings.

The ship was armed with four 45-calibre 4.7-inch (120 mm) Mark XII guns in dual-purpose mounts. For anti-aircraft (AA) defence, Scourge had one twin mount for Bofors 40 mm guns and four twin 20-millimetre (0.8 in) Oerlikon autocannon. She was fitted with two above-water quadruple mounts for 21-inch (533 mm) torpedoes. Two depth charge rails and four throwers were fitted for which 70 depth charges were provided.

== Construction and career ==
HMS Scourge was built by Cammell Laird, Birkenhead and launched on 8 December 1942. She was at sea during the Battle of North Cape in 1943, escorting the Russia-bound Arctic convoy JW 55B. She took no part in the fighting.

=== Postwar ===
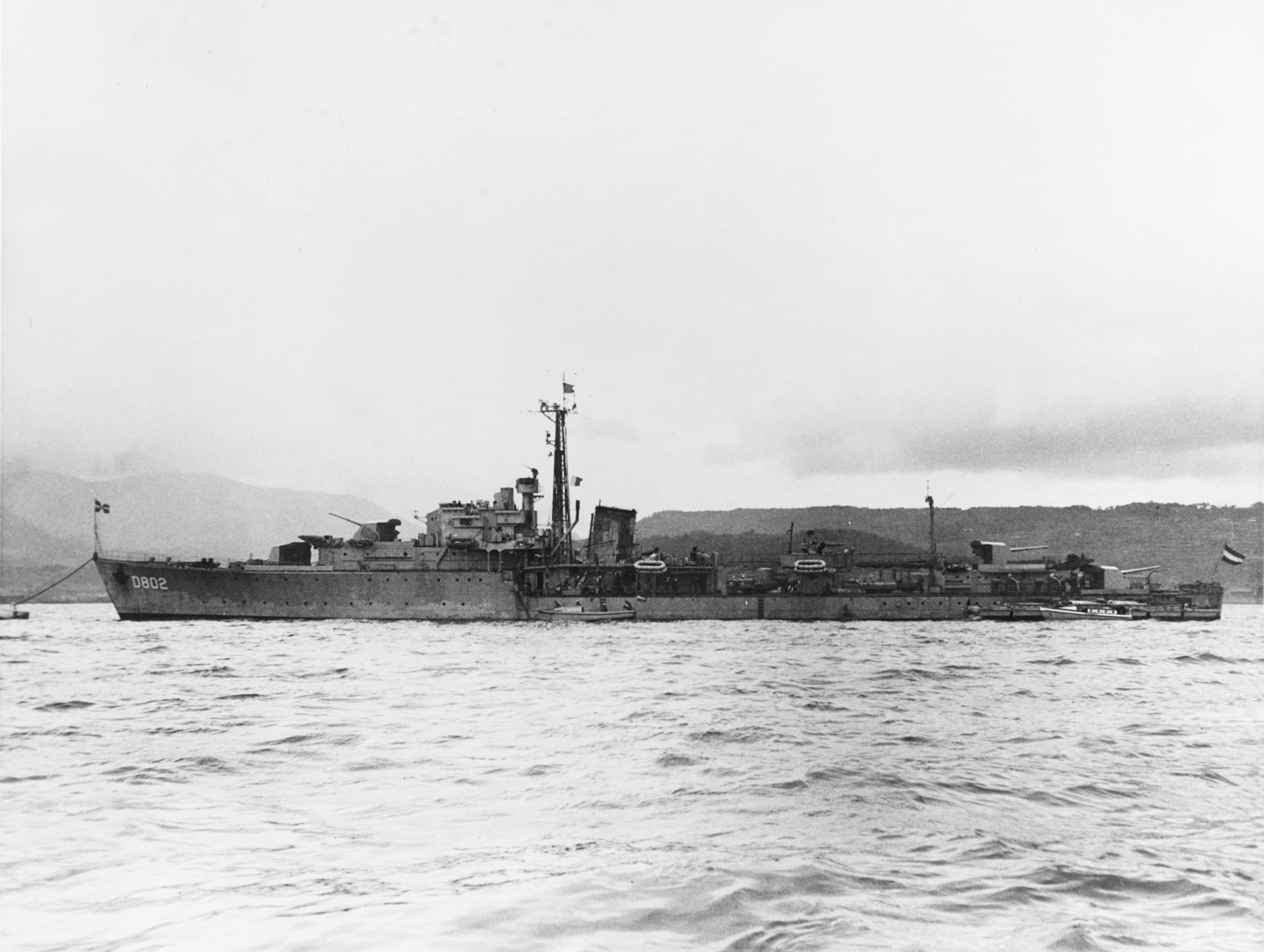
Evertsen (D802) at Yokosuka 1951.

Plan from 1944

She was sold to the Royal Netherlands Navy on 1 February 1946 and was renamed HNLMS Evertsen (D802). During the Korean War she was part of the diverse Task Force 96 in the US Seventh Fleet, and saw service during the Battle of Pusan Perimeter. She was converted to a fast frigate in 1957.

She was deployed during the period of tension between the Netherlands and Indonesia over the fate of New Guinea, and saw action during the Battle of Arafura Sea, sinking the Indonesian Jaguar-class torpedo boat Matjan Tutul, commanded by Yos Sudarso.

She was scrapped at Hendrik-Ido-Ambacht from July 1963.

== Bibliography ==
- Chesneau, Roger, ed. (1980). Conway's All the World's Fighting Ships 1922–1946. Greenwich, UK: Conway Maritime Press. ISBN 0-85177-146-7.
- Colledge, J. J.; Warlow, Ben (2006) [1969]. Ships of the Royal Navy: The Complete Record of All Fighting Ships of the Royal Navy from the 15th Century to the Present (3rd Rev ed.). London: Chatham Publishing. ISBN 978-1-86176-281-8. OCLC 67375475.
- English, John (2001). Obdurate to Daring: British Fleet Destroyers 1941–45. Windsor, UK: World Ship Society. ISBN 978-0-9560769-0-8.
- Lenton, H. T. (1998). British & Empire Warships of the Second World War. Annapolis, Maryland: Naval Institute Press. ISBN 1-55750-048-7.
- Raven, Alan; Roberts, John (1978). War Built Destroyers O to Z Classes. London: Bivouac Books. ISBN 0-85680-010-4.
- Whitley, M. J. (1988). Destroyers of World War 2. Annapolis, Maryland: Naval Institute Press. ISBN 0-87021-326-1.
