= ST Kowloondocks =

Coordinates: 22.3109°N 114.1261°E

Kowloondocks was a British steam powered tugboat that sunk in 1962 in Victoria Harbour.

The sinking occurred during Typhoon Wanda with all 30 crew members lost.
