= Purna Bhakti Pertiwi Museum =

Purna Bhakti Pertiwi Museum Museum Purna Bhakti Pertiwi
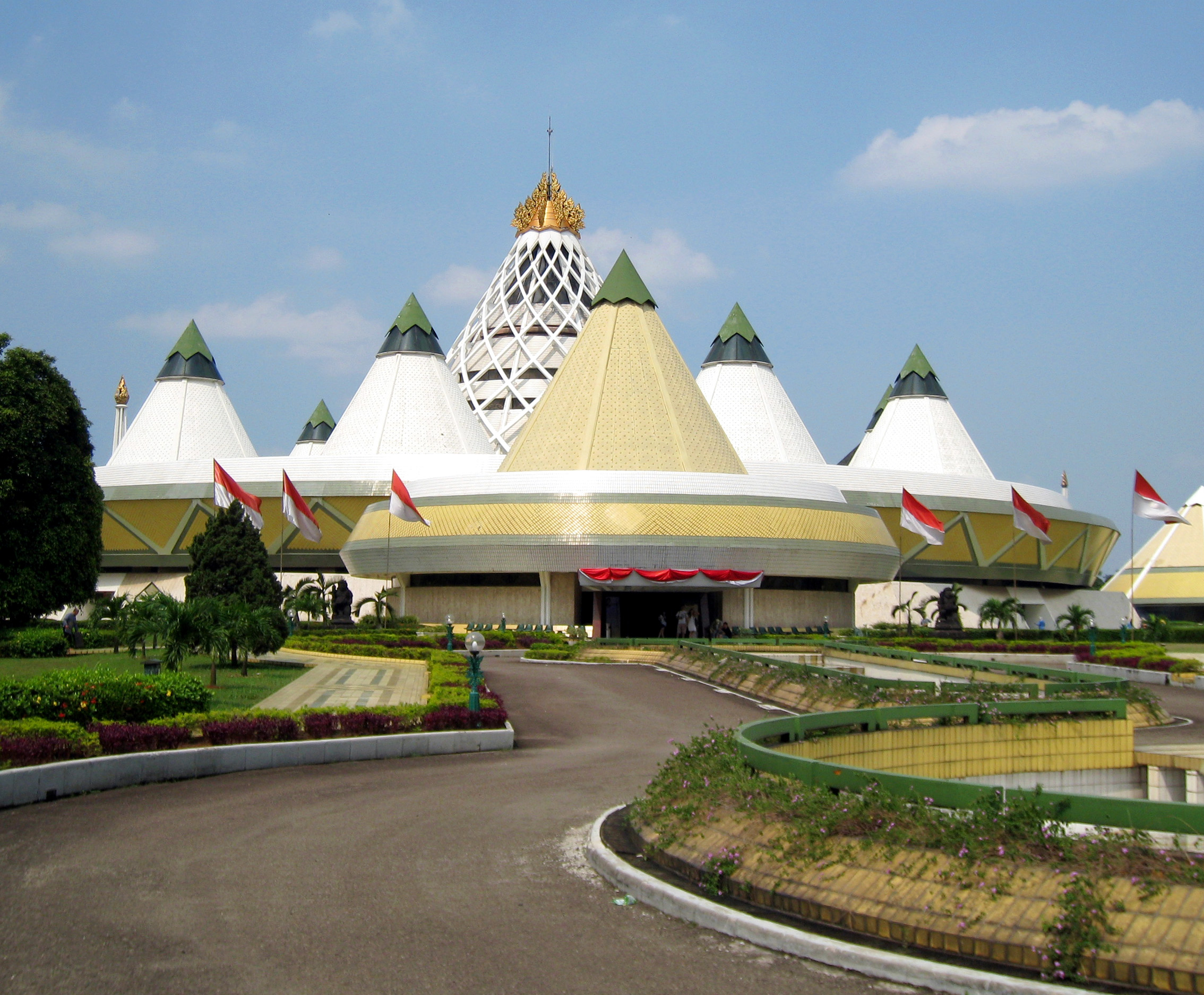
- Facade of Purna Bhakti Pertiwi Museum.
- Established: August 23, 1993
- Location: Jl. Taman Mini I, Taman Mini Indonesia Indah, Jakarta 13560, Indonesia
- Type: Specialized political figure history museum

The Purna Bhakti Pertiwi Museum, is a history museum specialized on the life of Suharto, the former second president of Indonesia and a powerful political figure in modern Indonesian history. It is located in Taman Mini Indonesia Indah (TMII), Jakarta, Indonesia. The museum houses and displays the large amount of Suharto's collections; mostly valuable objects, artworks and souvenirs, received from various world leaders and Indonesian people, accumulated during the 32 years of his administration in Indonesia. The museum is a modern building designed with the shapes of tumpeng, a traditional Javanese cone-shaped rice dish which symbolizes gratitude.

== History ==
Purna Bhakti Pertiwi Museum was built on the initiative of Madame Tien Suharto, as an expression of gratitude to God Almighty and high appreciation in honor of Indonesian and international community for their attention and support for Suharto. It was built by Purna Bhakti Pertiwi Foundation for 5 years between 1987 and 1992 on an area of 19.73 ha. On August 23, 1993, the museum was inaugurated by President Suharto.

== Collections ==
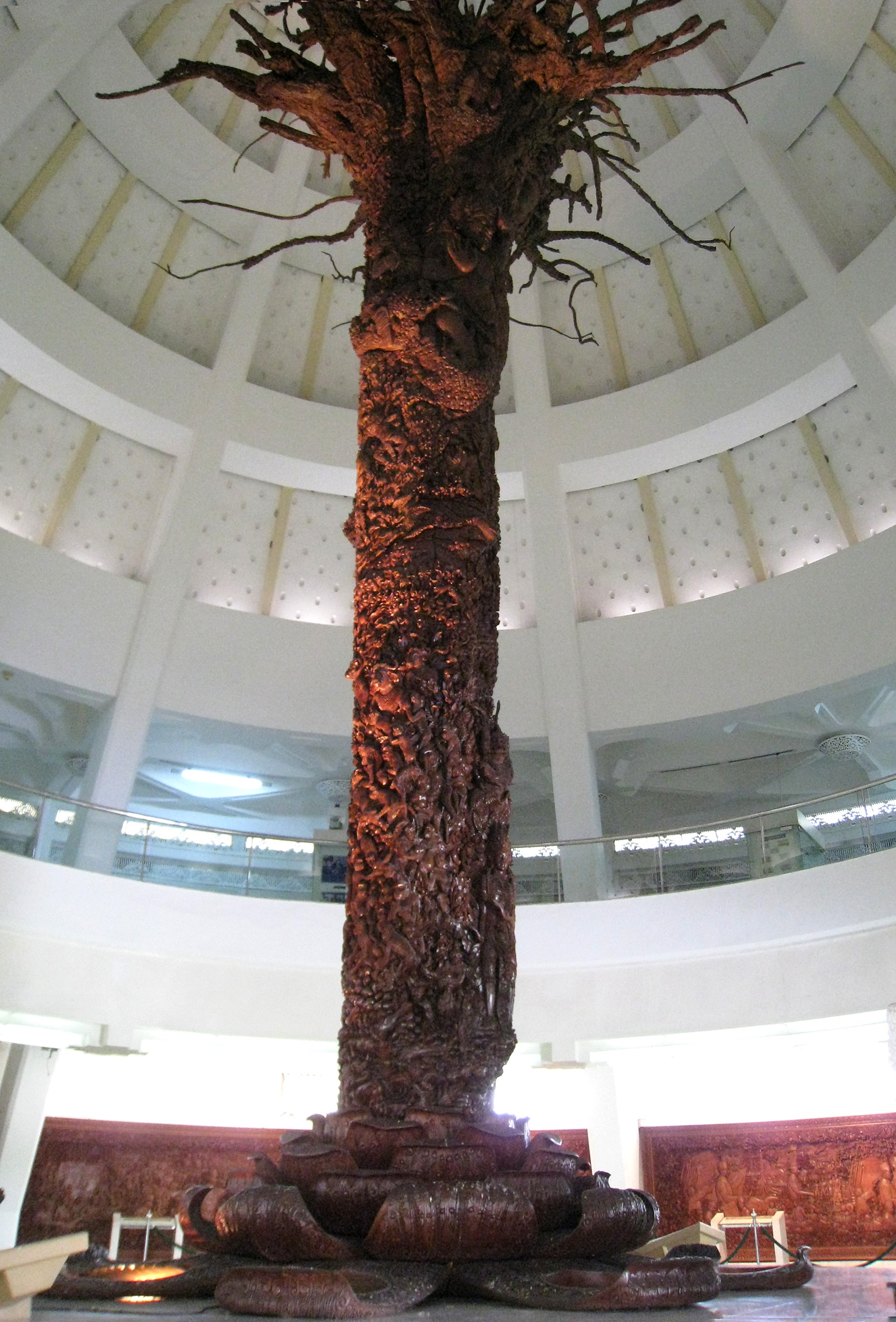
The 9.8 metres tall whole tree Javanese wooden carving depicting Rama Tambak, an episode taken from Ramayana.

The complex of Purna Bhakti Pertiwi Museum consists of main building, supporting buildings, landscape, and house of painting. The cone-shaped main building with a floor space approximately 18,605 square metres, consists of: Struggle Hall, Main Hall, Special Hall, Asthabrata Hall, and Library. It stores historical objects of Suharto's life, dating from the struggle of Indonesian independence to the era of Indonesian development.

The main room stores various souvenirs given by the Soeharto's state visitors, friends and acquaintances, among of whom are the Cambodian Prime Minister Hun Sen and Malaysian Prime Minister Mahatir Mohammad. They both presented the silver betel case. The Dutch Prime Minister, Lubbers, presented a silver pigeon statue, the Mexican President, Carlos Salinas de Gortari, gave the silver gourd-shape handicraft and the President of Kazakhstan, Nursultan Nazarbayev, granted a set of the silver plates. Many more stately gifts were displayed.

The gifts collections also presented by Indonesian bureaucrats, political figures and businessman, such as an engraved-stone bowl was from the wife of the Tulungagung Regent. The note on the bowl says “kindly presented to Mrs. Tien Soeharto from Mrs. Hardjanti Poernanto”. And the famous Indonesian businessman, Sudwikatmono, presented the Johar wood (Cassia Siamea) engraved with parents outflanked by their 11 children. The note on the wood which is named Membrayut work of I Ketut Modern says “Old People Believe that many children, many fortunes.” The main room also stores the replica of the Chinese princess bed (Peraduan). It was made of the green jade-jadeite from the Yunan province, China. It is said that the bed with 2.77 meter in length, 2.14 meter in width, imitated the Chinese girl bed in the Sung Dynasty (960-1279) and the Ming Dynasty.

The special hall stores the military decorations and medal of honors once granted to Suharto, some of which are Bintang RI Adipura I (1968), Bintang Mahaputra Adipurna (1968), and Bintang Gerilya (1965). The honors were also from Arab Emirate Union, Brunei Darussalam, Singapore, Japan etc. Besides, the honor swords from PLO leader Yasser Arafat and the Croatian President, Franjo Tudman are also stored in the special room. Tudman presented the crystal sword.

The Asthabrata hall displays the philosophy of the leadership of Suharto. It is chronologically visualized in form of wayang. The hall also displays the story of Wahyu Makutha Rama, as well as literatures from different disciplines.

== Museum design ==
The architectural concept is reflected in the building and floor plan design. The cone-shaped form of the main building is derived from the shape of the tumpeng, a traditional Javanese cone-shaped rice particularly important during slametan or syukuran thanks-giving ceremony, symbolized gratitude to God. The conical shape also symbolized the kalpataru tree of life, other symbolic patterns such as Jayakusuma flower, Cakra Manggilingan batik pattern, reflected in museum design.

The supporting buildings consist of receiving gates, a gift shop, a small mosque, office management building, minibus shelter, multipurpose hall, a playground, and an aviary for white peafowl. Exterior landscape functions as recreational area with greenery, cultivated with various flower and rare plants of Indonesia. In addition, on the yard displayed the Indonesian Navy torpedo boat KRI Harimau, a historical Jaguar-class fast attack craft of Indonesian West Irian (West Papua) campaign back in 1962.
