= Yos Sudarso =

Indonesian naval officer (1925–1962)

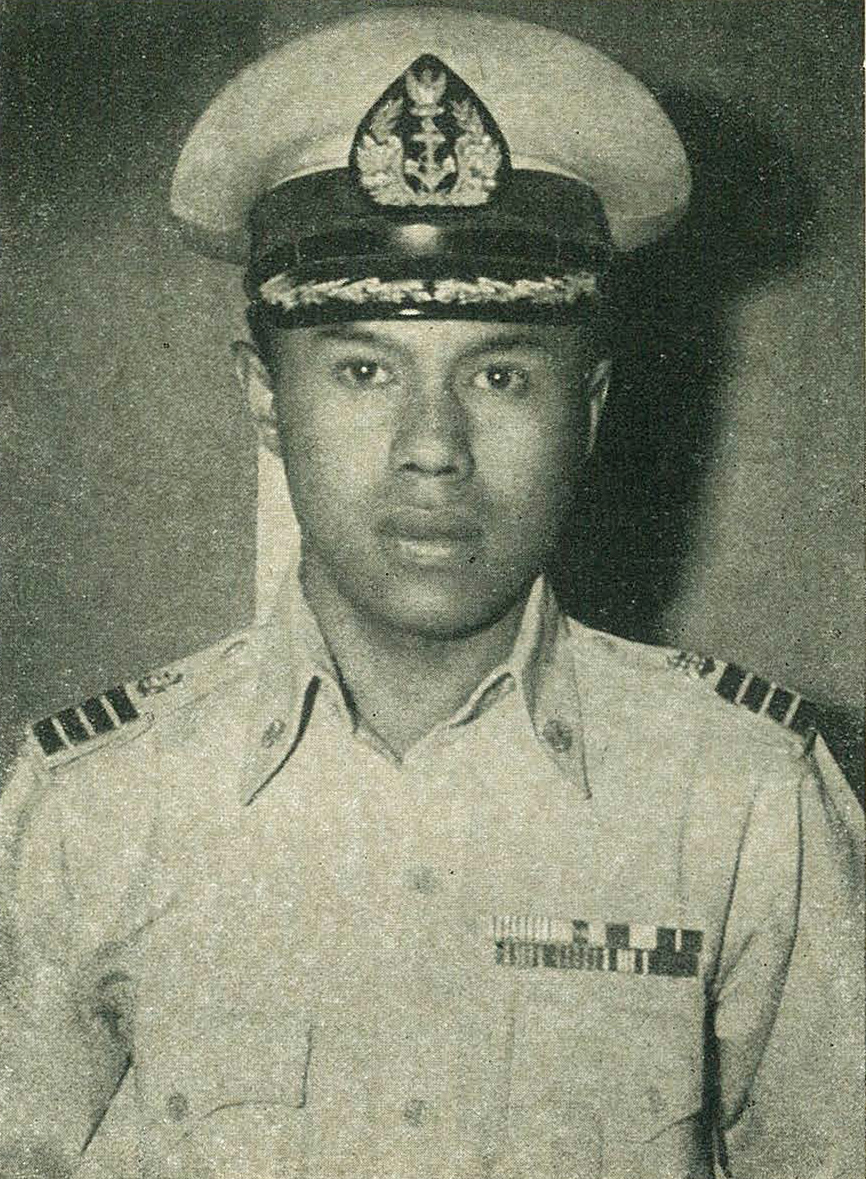
- Sudarso, c. 1960
- Born: Yosaphat Sudarso; 24 November 1925; Salatiga, Dutch East Indies
- Died: 15 January 1962 (aged 36); Arafura Sea
- Spouse: Siti Kustini (m. 1955–1962)
- Children: 5
- Military career
- Allegiance: Indonesia
- Branch: Indonesian Navy
- Service years: 1945–1962
- Rank: Vice Admiral (posthumously)
- Commands: RI Matjan Tutul
- Last battle: Battle of Arafura Sea †
- Awards: National Hero of Indonesia

Yosaphat "Yos" Sudarso (24 November 1925 – 15 January 1962) was an Indonesian naval officer killed at the Battle of Arafura Sea. At the time of his death, Yos Sudarso was deputy chief of staff of the Indonesian Navy and in charge of an action to infiltrate Dutch New Guinea. He was promoted to vice admiral (Indonesian: Laksamana Madya) posthumously.

The Battle near Vlakke Hoek (Etna Bay) of the Arafura Sea stopped an attempt by the Indonesian Navy to drop off 150 soldiers in Kaimana in Dutch New Guinea for sabotage and to incite the local population against the Dutch government. Sudarso was in charge of the operation at sea, while Colonel Murshid commanded the infiltrants. Three Jaguar-class torpedo boats left the Aru Islands in the middle of the night but were intercepted by a Dutch reconnaissance plane, as the Dutch had anticipated the action for weeks. The torpedo boats responded to the flares sent off by the plane by shooting at it. The Dutch destroyer HNLMS Evertsen then joined the scene and sunk the RI Matjan Tutul, commanded by Sudarso. The other two ships, RI Matjan Kumbang and RI Harimau, fled, but one hit a reef and the other was disabled by shooting. The Evertsen was able to save most occupants of the Matjan Tutul, but at least three sailors died, among whom was Commodore Sudarso.

The action itself was an abject failure and General Nasution even refused to relay the bad news to Sukarno, forcing Colonel Murshid to do this in person. However, the small battle was partially responsible for the subsequent involvement of the Soviet Union and United States in the case of Dutch New Guinea, and it is honored in Indonesia by "Sea Sacrifice Day," an annual nationwide day of remembrance. Twelve years after his death, Yos Sudarso was officially added to the register of Indonesian heroes of the Revolution. Indonesia issued a special postage stamp to commemorate his service to his country, while the RI Harimau was made into a monument at Purna Bhakti Pertiwi Museum in Taman Mini Indonesia Indah.

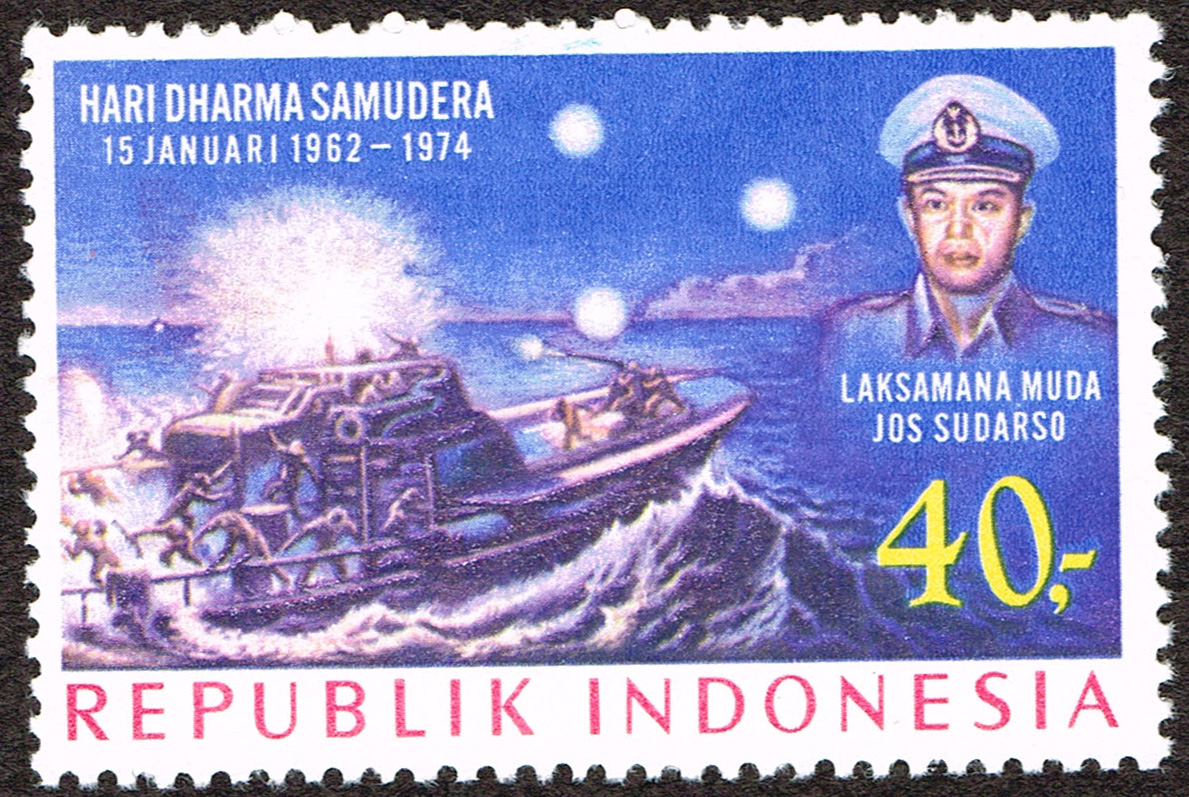

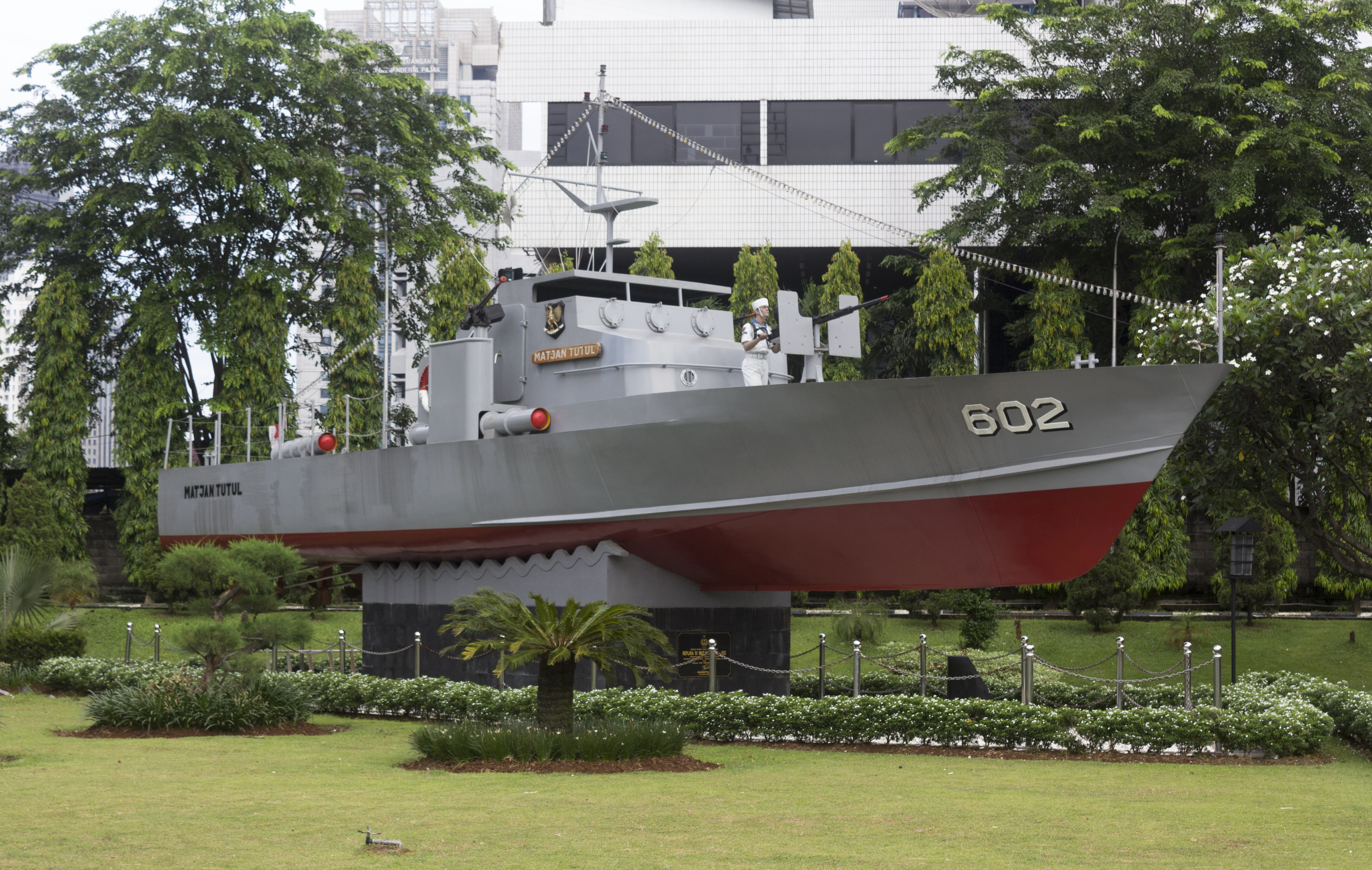
A replica of the RI Matjan Tutul at the Satriamandala Museum

Indonesia's Yos Sudarso Island and Yos Sudarso Bay are named in his honor. There are two Indonesian Navy ships named after him. The first ship was KRI Jos Sudarso (351), a Riga-class frigate commissioned in 1963 and retired in 1986. The second ship is an ex-Dutch Van Speijk-class frigate named KRI Yos Sudarso (353) which is still active in the fleet today.
