= HMS Undaunted (R53) =

U-class destroyer converted to Type 15 frigate of the Royal Navy

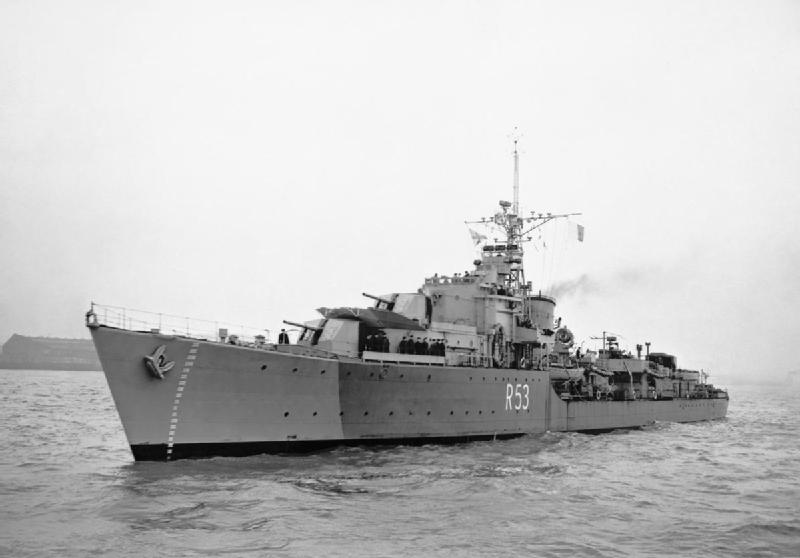
- HMS Undaunted on the River Mersey, 28 February 1944

History

United Kingdom
- Name: HMS Undaunted
- Builder: Cammell Laird
- Laid down: 8 September 1942
- Launched: 19 July 1943
- Commissioned: 3 March 1944
- Decommissioned: 1974
- Identification: Pennant number R53
- Fate: Sunk as target November 1978

General characteristics U-class destroyer
- Class & type: U-class destroyer
- Displacement: 1,777 long tons (1,806 t) standard; 2,058 long tons (2,091 t) full load
- Length: 363 ft (111 m)
- Beam: 35 ft 8 in (10.87 m)
- Draught: 10 ft (3.0 m)
- Propulsion: 2 × Admiralty 3-drum water-tube boilers; Geared steam turbines, 40,000 shp (29,828 kW); 2 shafts
- Speed: 37 knots (43 mph; 69 km/h)
- Range: 4,860 nmi (9,000 km) at 29 kn (54 km/h)
- Complement: 180 (225 in flotilla leader)
- Armament: Original configuration : 4 × QF 4.7-inch (120-mm) Mk XII guns in single mountings CP Mk.XXII; 2 × QF 40 mm Bofors guns in twin mount Mk.IV; 6 × QF 20 mm Oerlikon guns; 2 × twin mounts Mk.V, 2 × single mounts Mk.III; 2 × quadruple tubes for 21 in (533 mm) torpedo Mk.IX

General characteristics Type 15 frigate
- Class & type: Type 15 frigate
- Displacement: 2,300 long tons (2,337 t) standard
- Length: 358 ft (109 m) o/a
- Beam: 37 ft 9 in (11.51 m)
- Draught: 14 ft 6 in (4.42 m)
- Propulsion: 2 × Admiralty 3-drum boilers, steam turbines on 2 shafts, 40,000 shp
- Speed: 31 knots (36 mph; 57 km/h) (full load)
- Complement: 174
- Sensors & processing systems: Radar; Type 293Q target indication (later Type 993); Type 277Q surface search; Type 974 navigation; Type 262 fire control on director CRBF; Type 1010 Cossor Mark 10 IFF; Sonar: Type 174 search; Type 162 target classification; Type 170 attack
- Armament: 1 × twin 4 in gun Mark 19; 1 × twin 40mm Bofors Mk.5; 2 × Squid A/S mortar or; 2 × Limbo Mark 10 A/S mortar

HMS Undaunted was a U-class destroyer of the British Royal Navy that saw service during World War II. She was later converted into a Type 15 fast anti-submarine frigate, with the new pennant number F53.

== Design ==
Undaunted was one of eight U-class destroyers ordered as the 7th Emergency Flotilla on 12 June 1941. The U-class were War Emergency Programme destroyers, intended for general duties, including use as anti-submarine escort, and were to be suitable for mass-production. They were based on the hull and machinery of the pre-war J-class destroyers, but with a lighter armament (effectively whatever armament was available) in order to speed production. The U-class were almost identical to the S-class ordered as the 5th Emergency Flotilla and the R-class ordered as the 6th Emergency Flotilla earlier in the year, but were not fitted for operations in Arctic waters.

The U-class were 362 feet 9 inches (110.57 m) long overall, 348 feet 0 inches (106.07 m) at the waterline and 339 feet 6 inches (103.48 m) between perpendiculars, with a beam of 35 feet 8 inches (10.87 m) and a draught of 10 feet 0 inches (3.05 m) mean and 14 feet 3 inches (4.34 m) full load. Displacement was 1,777 long tons (1,806 t) standard and 2,508 long tons (2,548 t) full load. Two Admiralty 3-drum water-tube boilers supplied steam at 300 pounds per square inch (2,100 kPa) and 630 °F (332 °C) to two sets of Parsons single-reduction geared steam turbines, which drove two propeller shafts. The machinery was rated at 40,000 shaft horsepower (30,000 kW) giving a maximum speed of 36 knots (41 mph; 67 km/h) and 32 knots (37 mph; 59 km/h) at full load. 615 tons of oil were carried, giving a range of 4,675 nautical miles (5,380 mi; 8,658 km) at 20 knots (23 mph; 37 km/h).

The ship had a main gun armament of four 4.7 inch (120 mm) QF Mk. IX guns, capable of elevating to an angle of 55 degrees, giving a degree of anti-aircraft capability. The close-in anti-aircraft armament for the class was one Hazemayer stabilised twin mount for the Bofors 40 mm gun and four twin Oerlikon 20 mm cannons. Two quadruple mounts for 21 inch (533 mm) torpedoes were fitted (these were actually spare quintuple mounts with the centre tube removed), while the ship had a depth charge outfit of four depth charge mortars and two racks, with a total of 70 charges carried.

Undaunted was fitted with a Type 291 air warning and Type 276 surface warning radar on the ship's lattice foremast, together with a high-frequency direction finding (HF/DF) aerial. A Type 285 fire control radar integrated with the ship's high-angle gun director, while the Hazemayer mount had an integrated Type 282 radar. Undaunted had a crew of 179 officers and other ranks.

=== Type 15 modification ===
After the end of the Second World War and as the Cold War started, the Royal Navy found itself with a shortage of fast anti-submarine escorts capable of dealing with modern Soviet diesel-electric submarines, with existing sloops and frigates too slow. At the same time, the relatively recent War Emergency destroyers, with their low-angle guns and basic fire control systems, were considered unsuitable for modern warfare, so it was decided to convert these obsolete destroyers into fast escorts, acting as a stop-gap solution until new-build ships, such as the Type 12 frigates could be built in sufficient numbers. The Type 15 frigate was a rebuild of War Emergency destroyers into 'first-rate' anti-submarine ships, with similar anti-submarine equipment as the new frigates. The ships' superstructure and armament was removed, with the ships' forecastle extended rearwards and a new, low but full width superstructure fitted. The revised ships had a much reduced gun armament of one twin 4-inch (102 mm) anti aircraft mount aft of the main superstructure and one twin Bofors mount, but anti-submarine equipment was as fitted to the Type 12s, with Undaunted being fitted with two Limbo anti-submarine mortars, directed by Type 170 and 172 sonar.

== Construction ==
Undaunted was laid down at Cammell Laird's Birkenhead shipyard on 8 September 1942 and was launched on 19 July 1943. She was completed on 3 March 1944, and assigned the Pennant number R53.

== Service history ==
=== Second World War service ===
Undaunted's long career started soon after her launching and acceptance into the fleet in 1944. Built as a destroyer of 1,710 tons, most of her first ship's company joined her in February 1944, after travelling by overnight troop train from Devonport Barracks.

=== Operations against the Tirpitz ===
After a hasty work up at Scapa Flow, her first action was in the operation to try to sink the German battleship Tirpitz in the Norwegian Altenfjord. She operated in the North Cape area where she escorted the aircraft carriers Furious, Victorious, Emperor, Fencer, Searcher and Pursuer with other escorts, including the battleship Anson, cruisers Belfast, Jamaica, Sheffield, Royalist, destroyers Meteor, Milne, Onslaught, Ursa, Verulam, Vigilant, Virago and Wakeful. She was also joined by the Royal Canadian Navy ships Algonquin and Sioux. The aircraft from the carriers scored 14 hits.

=== D-Day ===
She subsequently took part in the D-Day landings, as part of Task Force G, covering the Roger section of Sword Beach. It was while she was at Normandy that the recently appointed Supreme Allied Commander in Europe, General Dwight D. Eisenhower was embarked in her from the fast mine laying cruiser Apollo, which had grounded, damaging her propellers. General Eisenhower and Admiral Ramsay were given a fast passage back to Portsmouth by Undaunted and his flag was a Wardroom "Trophy" until 1969, when it was presented to the National Trust for Scotland during a ceremony in Edinburgh, during a visit to Leith.

=== The Eisenhower flag ===
The flag resides in the National Trust for Scotland property of Culzean Castle in Ayrshire, Scotland, in the Eisenhower exhibition along with some other items of his, including his presidential flag, shirt, jacket and tie. The flag is thin and crudely made, and has Eisenhower's signature on two of the four stars sewn on. The description board for the flag states:

Flag presented to the Officers and Men of HMS Undaunted by General Eisenhower. During the afternoon of 7 June 1944, HMS Undaunted embarked General Eisenhower, Admiral Ramsay and their staffs, whose ship had grounded. This flag was hoisted at the starboard yard arm. General Eisenhower signed his name across two of the stars, using an indelible pencil dipped in whiskey.

=== The Mediterranean and Far East ===
After D-Day, Undaunted saw service in the Mediterranean and did a great deal of escort work out of Malta. She then went on to Bari, Brindisi and Taranto (Italy), where crew members earned the Italy Medal for operations such as bombarding the Coast Road by Ancona, to help the Army and she was also engaged in operations off the coast of Yugoslavia.

She then travelled through the Suez Canal to Aden and Bombay, where she was engaged in escorting troopships. As part of the British Pacific Fleet she was assigned the pennant number D25, she acted as Guard ship off Yokohama Bay on VJ Day, whilst the peace treaty was being signed aboard the US battleship USS Missouri. Shortly after VJ Day, Undaunted sailed into Sydney, Australia, flying the flags of Japan, Germany and Italy. She also flew the flags of France, United States, China and Poland, as well as the personal flag of Dwight D. Eisenhower. One officer explained "We were feeling exuberant and flew the lot."

She then went on to Auckland, New Zealand, where she was in refit for six weeks, having steamed 150,000 miles since commissioning some 18 months beforehand. In January 1946, she sailed home via Sydney, Melbourne, Cape Town, St Helena, Freetown and Gibraltar, to Plymouth, where she arrived on 19 March 1946.

=== Post war ===
Between 1946 and 1953 she was held in reserve at Devonport. Between 1953 and 1954, like many former wartime destroyers, she was converted into a Type 15 anti submarine frigate, at the Cowes shipyard of J. Samuel White. Following her conversion, she was assigned the new pennant number F53.

On 23 July 1954 she re-commissioned for service with the 2nd Training Squadron at Portland, where she was employed for trials of anti-submarine equipment. In March 1958 she commissioned for service with the 6th Frigate Squadron. She was fitted with a flight deck in 1959 and became the first small ship in the Navy trials to carry an anti-submarine helicopter - the naval version of the Saro P.531, later developed into the Westland Wasp. The Wasp's main role was for anti-submarine warfare. She was also briefly fitted in 1959 with three fixed tubes for anti-submarine torpedoes, but these tubes were later removed.

In April 1960, she commissioned as part of the 20th Frigate squadron at Londonderry Port, serving as Master Anti-Submarine Ship, controlling the training exercises carried out by the Squadron and acting as a demonstration ship for courses at the Londonderry Port-based Joint Anti-Submarine School. She remained part of the Squadron until 1961. From October 1961 she underwent a refit at Rosyth Dockyard and on 16 February 1962 she re-commissioned as part of the 2nd Frigate Squadron at Portland.

She later became Captain "D" of the Portland Training Squadron, spending most of her time day-running out of Portland, training TAS ratings in anti-submarine warfare. Between 1964 and 1967 she had a long refit at Chatham. In 1968 she took part in Navy Days at Portsmouth while commanded by Captain A Desmond Cassidi. In 1969 she underwent another five-month refit at Chatham dockyard.

=== Decommissioning and disposal ===
Undaunted was in commission until late 1973, when she was reduced to reserve. In November 1974 she was used as a target by the destroyer HMS Norfolk (D21), which fired an Exocet anti-ship missile. Undaunted was towed by its stern to Gibraltar for damage analysis and light repair. In November 1978 she was again used as a target ship by HMS Norfolk, again firing a live Exocet anti-ship missile, together with Seaslug and Seacat anti-aircraft missiles, before the submarine Swiftsure sank the frigate with a torpedo. She now rests on the seabed in the Atlantic Ocean.
