= HMS Ulster (R83) =

U-class destroyer converted to Type 15 frigate of the Royal Navy

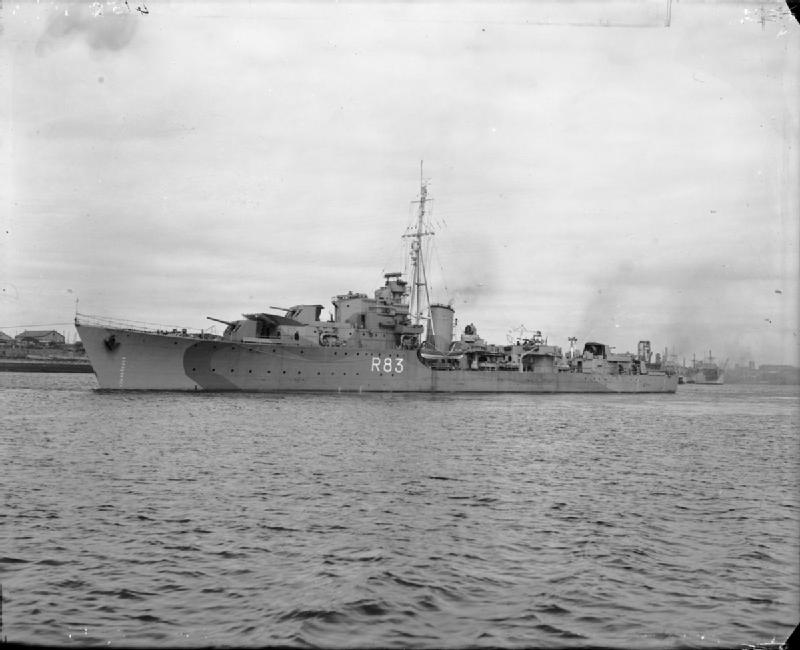
- HMS Ulster on the River Tyne, 26 June 1943

History

United Kingdom
- Name: HMS Ulster
- Builder: Swan Hunter, Tyne and Wear, United Kingdom
- Laid down: 12 November 1941
- Launched: 9 November 1942
- Commissioned: 30 June 1943
- Decommissioned: 1977
- Identification: Pennant number R83
- Fate: Withdrawn from service 1977; Broken up 1980

General characteristics V-class destroyer
- Class & type: V-class destroyer
- Displacement: 1,777 long tons (1,806 t) standard; 2,058 long tons (2,091 t) full load
- Length: 363 ft (111 m)
- Beam: 35 ft 8 in (10.87 m)
- Draught: 10 ft (3.0 m)
- Propulsion: 2 × Admiralty 3-drum water-tube boilers; Geared steam turbines, 40,000 shp (29,828 kW); 2 shafts
- Speed: 37 knots (43 mph; 69 km/h)
- Range: 4,860 nmi (9,000 km) at 29 kn (54 km/h)
- Complement: 180 (225 in flotilla leader)
- Armament: Original configuration : 4 × QF 4.7-inch (120-mm) Mk XII guns in single mountings CP Mk.XXII; 2 × QF 40 mm Bofors guns in twin mount Mk.IV; 6 × QF 20 mm Oerlikon guns; 2 × twin mounts Mk.V, 2 × single mounts Mk.III; 2 × quadruple tubes for 21 in (533 mm) torpedo Mk.IX

General characteristics Type 15 frigate
- Class & type: Type 15 frigate
- Displacement: 2,300 long tons (2,337 t) standard
- Length: 358 ft (109 m) o/a
- Beam: 37 ft 9 in (11.51 m)
- Draught: 14 ft 6 in (4.42 m)
- Propulsion: 2 × Admiralty 3-drum boilers, steam turbines on 2 shafts, 40,000 shp
- Speed: 31 knots (36 mph; 57 km/h) (full load)
- Complement: 174
- Sensors & processing systems: Radar; Type 293Q target indication (later Type 993); Type 277Q surface search; Type 974 navigation; Type 262 fire control on director CRBF; Type 1010 Cossor Mark 10 IFF; Sonar: Type 174 search; Type 162 target classification; Type 170 attack
- Armament: 1 × twin 4 in gun Mark 19; 1 × twin 40mm Bofors Mk.5; 2 × Squid A/S mortar or; 2 × Limbo Mark 10 A/S mortar

HMS Ulster was a U-class destroyer of the Royal Navy of the United Kingdom that saw service during World War II. She was later converted into a Type 15 fast anti-submarine frigate, with the new pennant number F83. Ulster was the second vessel in Royal Navy history to have that name.

With funds gathered through a Naval Savings Campaign in 1942 known as Warship Week, the ship was adopted by the civil community of Ulster's County Down.

== Specifications ==
Ulster was one of eight U-class destroyers ordered as the 7th Emergency Flotilla on 12 June 1941. The U-class were War Emergency Programme destroyers, intended for general duties, including use as anti-submarine escort, and were to be suitable for mass-production. They were based on the hull and machinery of the pre-war J-class destroyers, but with a lighter armament (effectively whatever armament was available) in order to speed production. The U-class were almost identical to the S-class ordered as the 5th Emergency Flotilla and the R-class ordered as the 6th Emergency Flotilla earlier in the year, but were not fitted for operations in Arctic waters.

The U-class were 362 feet 9 inches (110.57 m) long overall, 348 feet 0 inches (106.07 m) at the waterline and 339 feet 6 inches (103.48 m) between perpendiculars, with a beam of 35 feet 8 inches (10.87 m) and a draught of 10 feet 0 inches (3.05 m) mean and 14 feet 3 inches (4.34 m) full load. Displacement was 1,777 long tons (1,806 t) standard and 2,508 long tons (2,548 t) full load. Two Admiralty 3-drum water-tube boilers supplied steam at 300 pounds per square inch (2,100 kPa) and 630 °F (332 °C) to two sets of Parsons single-reduction geared steam turbines, which drove two propeller shafts. The machinery was rated at 40,000 shaft horsepower (30,000 kW) giving a maximum speed of 36 knots (41 mph; 67 km/h) and 32 knots (37 mph; 59 km/h) at full load. 615 tons of oil were carried, giving a range of 4,675 nautical miles (5,380 mi; 8,658 km) at 20 knots (23 mph; 37 km/h).

The ship had a main gun armament of four 4.7 inch (120 mm) QF Mk. IX guns, capable of elevating to an angle of 55 degrees, giving a degree of anti-aircraft capability. The close-in anti-aircraft armament for the class was one Hazemayer stabilised twin mount for the Bofors 40 mm gun and four twin Oerlikon 20 mm cannons. Two quadruple mounts for 21 inch (533 mm) torpedoes were fitted (these were actually spare quintuple mounts with the centre tube removed), while the ship had a depth charge outfit of four depth charge mortars and two racks, with a total of 70 charges carried.

== Service history ==
=== Second World War service ===
In June 1943 construction was completed and Ulster went into duty in the English Channel. By the end of the year she would be on duty in the Mediterranean and Adriatic on anti-submarine missions, receiving damage from return fire. In April 1944 the destroyer would return to home waters and towards the end of the year would refit and have new radar and advanced warning systems installed.

At the beginning of 1945 Ulster was transferred to the British Pacific Fleet with the pendant "D", in keeping with the American system.

=== Pacific ===
Ulster, while serving with the British Pacific Fleet, had a near miss by a Japanese kamikaze and a 500 lb bomb during Operation Iceberg, the invasion of Okinawa. Ulster had her machinery spaces blown in and had to be lashed to the side of the Australian corvette HMAS "Kalgoorlie to prevent roll over to be taken to Leyte for temporary repairs, whence it sailed for Australia. Two sailors died and one was seriously injured in the attack the Kaloorlie conveyed the bodies and their burial party out to the deepest entrance to Leyte Gulf where the funeral was conducted. Nearly six months after the attack in October 1945 Ulster made it back to HM Dockyard, Chatham in England to undergo full repairs.

=== Post-War ===
After the Second World War Ulster was mostly used as a training vessel and for reserve purposes. Between 1953 and 1956 she underwent a full conversion to a Type 15 frigate at Chatham Dockyard. In 1957 she joined the 8th Frigate Squadron. Soon she was on duty in Iceland, Azores, and assigned to the North America and West Indies Station, based at the Royal Naval Dockyard in Bermuda, cruising to the West Indies and visiting the United States. In 1958 Ulster helped to restore power ashore in Nassau, Bahamas.

In 1964 she was again put into reserve in Plymouth. A year later in 1965, Ulster was re-commissioned in the 2nd Frigate Squadron, but then in 1967 was withdrawn from operational service.

In 1966, whilst coming out of dry dock in Plymouth failure of her telegraphs meant Ulster having rung on full stern rammed the jetty. The heavily damaged stern was replaced with that of HMS Urchin.

During the late 1960s, Ulster was used by naval ratings from HMS Vernon for seagoing training in the Sonar Control Room (SCR). In 1970 she was present at Portsmouth Navy Days; at the time she was the Navy's Navigational Training Ship. The destroyer was used as a training hulk at HMS Raleigh between 1974 and 1980. Finally in 1980 Ulster was bought by Thos. W. Ward and broken up.

== Bibliography ==
- Colledge, J. J.; Warlow, Ben (2006) [1969]. Ships of the Royal Navy: The Complete Record of All Fighting Ships of the Royal Navy from the 15th Century to the Present (3rd Rev ed.). London: Chatham Publishing. ISBN 978-1-86176-281-8. OCLC 67375475.
- Critchley, Mike (1982). British Warships Since 1945: Part 3: Destroyers. Liskeard, UK: Maritime Books. ISBN 0-9506323-9-2.
- Donald, William (1956). Stand by for Action: the Memoirs of a Small Ship Commander. London UK: William Kimber & Co. ltd. ISBN 978-1-84832-016-1.
- Friedman, Norman (2008). British Destroyers & Frigates: The Second World War and After. Barnsley, UK: Seaforth Publishing. ISBN 978-1-84832-015-4.
- Gardiner, Robert; Chesneau, Roger, eds. (1980). Conway's All The World's Fighting Ships 1922–1946. London: Conway Maritime Press. ISBN 0-85177-146-7.
- Lenton, H. T. (1970). Navies of the Second World War: British Fleet & Escort Destroyers Volume Two. London: Macdonald & Co. ISBN 0-356-03122-5.
- Marriott, Leo (1983). Royal Navy Frigates 1945–1983. Shepperton, UK: Ian Allan. ISBN 0-7110-1322-5.
- Raven, Alan; Roberts, John (1978). War Built Destroyers O to Z Classes. London: Bivouac Books. ISBN 0-85680-010-4.
- Richardson, Ian (August 2021). Osborne, Richard (ed.). "Type 15 Frigates, Part 2: Ship Histories". Warships: Marine News Supplement. 75 (8): 381–391. ISSN 0966-6958.
- Whitley, M. J. (1988). Destroyers of World War 2. Annapolis, Maryland: Naval Institute Press. ISBN 0-87021-326-1.
- Whitley, M. J. (2000). Destroyers of World War 2: An International Encyclopedia. London: Cassell & Co. ISBN 1-85409-521-8.
