= HMS Verulam (R28) =

V-class destroyer converted to Type 15 frigate of the Royal Navy

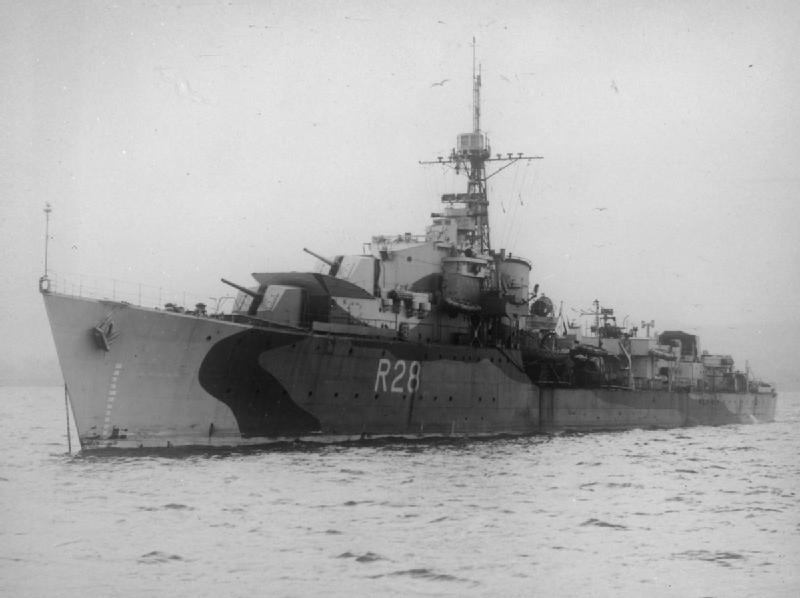
- Verulam anchored in the Clyde, December 1943

History

United Kingdom
- Name: HMS Verulam
- Ordered: 1 September 1941
- Builder: Swan Hunter
- Laid down: 26 June 1942
- Launched: 22 April 1943
- Commissioned: 12 December 1943
- Decommissioned: 1970
- Identification: Pennant number R28/F29
- Honours and awards: Arctic 1944; Normandy 1944; Norway 1944; Malaya 1945; Burma 1945
- Fate: Scrapped 23 September 1972

General characteristics V-class destroyer
- Class & type: V-class destroyer
- Displacement: 1,808 long tons (1,837 t) standard
- Length: 362 ft 9 in (110.57 m)
- Beam: 35 ft 8 in (10.87 m)
- Draught: 10 ft (3.0 m) mean
- Propulsion: 2 × Admiralty 3-drum water-tube boilers; Geared steam turbines, 40,000 shp (30,000 kW); 2 shafts
- Speed: 36 knots (41 mph; 67 km/h)
- Range: 4,675 nmi (8,658 km) at 20 kn (37 km/h)
- Complement: 179
- Armament: Original configuration : 4 × QF 4.7-inch (120-mm) Mk IX guns in single mountings CP Mk.XXII; 2 × QF 40 mm Bofors guns in twin mount Mk.IV; 8 × QF 20 mm Oerlikon guns; 4 × twin mounts; 2 × quadruple tubes for 21 in (533 mm) torpedo Mk.IX

General characteristics Type 15 frigate
- Class & type: Type 15 frigate
- Displacement: 2,300 long tons (2,337 t) standard
- Length: 358 ft (109 m) o/a
- Beam: 37 ft 9 in (11.51 m)
- Draught: 14 ft 6 in (4.42 m)
- Propulsion: 2 × Admiralty 3-drum boilers, steam turbines on 2 shafts, 40,000 shp
- Speed: 31 knots (36 mph; 57 km/h) (full load)
- Complement: 174
- Sensors & processing systems: Radar; Type 293Q target indication (later Type 993); Type 277Q surface search; Type 974 navigation; Type 262 fire control on director CRBF; Type 1010 Cossor Mark 10 IFF; Sonar: Type 174 search; Type 162 target classification; Type 170 attack
- Armament: 1 × twin 4 in gun Mark 19; 1 × twin 40mm Bofors Mk.5; 2 × Squid A/S mortar or; 2 × Limbo Mark 10 A/S mortar

HMS Verulam was a V-class destroyer of the British Royal Navy that saw service during the Second World War.

== Design and construction ==
Verulam was one of eight V-class destroyers ordered under the 1941 War Construction Programme as the 8th Emergency Flotilla on 1 September 1941. The V-class were War Emergency Programme destroyers, intended for general duties, including use as anti-submarine escort, and were to be suitable for mass-production. They were based on the hull and machinery of the pre-war J-class destroyers, but with a lighter armament (effectively whatever armament was available) in order to speed production. The V-class were repeats of the previous V-class, which in turn were almost identical to the S and T-class ordered earlier in the year. Unlike the U-class, the V-class were fitted for operations in Arctic waters.

The V-class were 362 feet 9 inches (110.57 m) long overall, 348 feet 0 inches (106.07 m) at the waterline and 339 feet 6 inches (103.48 m) between perpendiculars, with a beam of 35 feet 8 inches (10.87 m) and a draught of 10 feet 0 inches (3.05 m) mean and 14 feet 3 inches (4.34 m) full load. Displacement was 1,808 long tons (1,837 t) standard and 2,530 long tons (2,570 t) full load. Two Admiralty 3-drum water-tube boilers supplied steam at 300 pounds per square inch (2,100 kPa) and 630 °F (332 °C) to two sets of Parsons single-reduction geared steam turbines, which drove two propeller shafts. The machinery was rated at 40,000 shaft horsepower (30,000 kW) giving a maximum speed of 36 knots (41 mph; 67 km/h) and 32 knots (37 mph; 59 km/h) at full load. 615 tons of oil were carried, giving a range of 4,675 nautical miles (5,380 mi; 8,658 km) at 20 knots (23 mph; 37 km/h). The ship had a crew of 179 officers and other ranks.

The ship had a main gun armament of four 4.7 inch (120 mm) QF Mk. IX guns, capable of elevating to an angle of 55 degrees, giving a degree of anti-aircraft capability. The designed close-in anti-aircraft armament for the class, as fitted to Verulam on completion, was one Hazemayer stabilised twin mount for the Bofors 40 mm gun and four twin Oerlikon 20 mm cannons, In 1945, Verulam had two twin Oerlikon mounts abreast the ship's funnel replaced by single 40 mm Bofors mounts, with two more Bofors guns fitted abreast the main mast. Two quadruple mounts for 21 inch (533 mm) torpedoes were fitted, while the ship had a depth charge outfit of four depth charge mortars and two racks, with a total of 70 charges carried. Verulam was fitted with a Type 276 surface warning radar and a high-frequency direction finding (HF/DF) aerial on the ship's lattice foremast, together with Type 291 air warning radar on a short pole mast aft. A Type 285 fire control radar was integrated with the ship's high-angle gun director, while the Hazemayer mount had an integrated Type 282 radar.

Verulam was laid down at Fairfield's Govan, Glasgow shipyard on 26 January 1942 and was launched on 22 April 1943. She was commissioned on 26 November 1943, and assigned the Pennant number R28. Verulam was completed on 10 December 1943. She was the second ship of that name, based on the Roman name for St Albans (Verulamium).

== Service history ==
=== Second World War service ===
HMS Verulam began her service in January 1944 by joining the 26th Destroyer Flotilla, part of the Home Fleet. On 6 February 1944, Verulam, together with the destroyers Obedient and Swift, reinforced the escort of the Britain-bound Arctic convoy RA 56, leaving the convoy on 9 February. The same month HMS Verulam was part of the escort group attached to convoy JW 57 along with the light cruiser Black Prince and the escort carrier, Chaser. On 28 February the convoy reached the Kola Inlet with the loss of one destroyer, Mahratta, with the destruction of two U-boats claimed (U-713 and U-601). Verulam formed part of the return convoy RA 57, with one merchant ship being sunk with the escort accounting for three U-boats. Verulam left the convoy on 7 March 1944, with the convoy reaching Loch Ewe on 10 March.

In April 1944, Verulam formed part of the Home Fleet cover force for JW 58 and Operation Tungsten. There were a large number of Allied merchant ships in Russian arctic harbour waiting to return to Britain, so Verulam was part of a strong force of warships that arrived at the Kola Inlet on 23 April, with orders to escort the merchant ships back to Britain and carry a large number of personnel, (including the US Navy crew of the cruiser Milwaukee, which had been loaned to the Soviet Navy, and Soviet crews for ships waiting in British harbours) with them. On 28 April, Verulam embarked seventeen US navy personnel, and joined convoy RA 59. The convoy came under attack by German submarines, with one merchant ship sunk while three U-boats were sunk by aircraft operating from the carrier Fencer. Verulam left the convoy on 3 May.

During May 1944, Verulam was detached from the Home Fleet to participate in preparations for Operation Neptune. Verulam was assigned to Force 'S' of the Eastern Task Force, for the landings at Sword Beach. On 5–6 June, Verulam, together with the destroyers Virago, Kelvin and Eglinton escorted Convoy S7, consisting of the headquarters ship Largs, five Landing ship, infantry and one Landing Craft Infantry from Spithead to the disembarkation point. She then bombarded beach defences around Lion-sur-Mer in company of Virago and Serapis, and escorted the battleship Ramillies. She continued to carry out shore bombardments and patrols to prevent German interference with the invasion until released on 27 June.

On 10 August 1944, Verulam was part of the escort for the carriers Indefatigable, Trumpeter and Nabob as the carriers' aircraft struck at a German airbase at Gossen, near Kristiansund, Norway. In September 1944, Verulam formed part of the covering force for the Russia bound Arctic Convoy JW 60 and the return convoy RA 60. From August 1944, the Royal Navy began an offensive against German shipping passing through Norwegian coastal waters. On 21 October, as part of this offensive, Verulam was part of the escort for the carrier Implacable and the cruiser Bellona as Implacable's aircraft attacked Bardufoss airfield and shipping. From 26 to 28 October, Verulam again escorted Implacable as the carrier's aircraft attacked shipping off Bodø, Rørvik, Lødingen and Kristiansund. On the night of 12/13 November, Verulam formed part of a task force led by the cruisers Kent and Bellona, together with the destroyers Myngs, Zambesi and Algonquin in Operation Counterblast, as they attacked a German convoy between Listerfjord and Egersund. The British force overwhelmed the convoy's escort, sinking the freighters Greif and Cornouaille, together with the minesweepers M-416 and M-427 and the submarine chasers UJ 1221, UJ 1223 and UJ 1713, while the freighter Palermo and the minesweeper M-446 were damaged. Verulam was hit 22 times by German 37mm and 20mm shells, killing two and wounding five of her crew, although the ship's fighting efficiency was unaffected.

Verulam was then repaired and refitted at the Port of Immingham, this refit continuing until 7 February 1945. After a work-up period at Scapa Flow, Verulam was sent to join the East Indies Fleet, arriving at Trincomalee and rejoining the rest of the 26th Flotilla on 4 April 1945. From 8 April, Verulam took part in Operation Sunfish, a sweep by the battleship Queen Elizabeth, the French battleship Richelieu and the cruisers London and Cumberland, together with the escort carriers Emperor and Khedive and fie destroyers, along the coast of Sumatra, with Sabang shelled on 11 April, and attacks by the carrier's aircraft against Port Blair, Emmahaven and Padang on 11 and 16 April. Verulam participated in the Battle of the Malacca Strait with the destroyers Saumarez, Venus, Vigilant, and Virago, which culminated in the sinking of the Japanese cruiser Haguro on 16 May 1945.

=== Postwar service ===
In 1946 Verulam was part of the Londonderry Flotilla. Between February 1947 and March 1949 she was part of the 3rd Destroyer Flotilla, based in the Mediterranean. During that time she saw service, along with other Royal Navy ships in preventing illegal immigration into Palestine in 1947.

Between 1951 and 1952 she was converted into a Type 15 fast anti-submarine frigate at Portsmouth Dockyard, and was allocated the new pennant number F29. In 1953 she took part in the Fleet Review to celebrate the Coronation of Queen Elizabeth II. In 1954 Verulam was placed in the Portsmouth Reserve.

Between 1958 and 1961 Verulam was the Admiralty Surface Weapons Establishment (ASWE) trials ship, being used for development of the Type 2001 sonar used by the Royal Navy's early nuclear submarines. In 1961 she was transferred to the 2nd Frigate Squadron based at Portland, operating as trials ship for the Underwater Weapons Development establishment (AUWE).

=== Decommissioning and disposal ===
Verulam was paid off on 21 December 1970 and sold for scrap to John Cashmore Ltd and arrived at their yard at Newport, Wales for breaking on 23 October 1972.

== Bibliography ==
- Battle Summary - No. 39: Operation "Neptune" Landings in Normandy June 1944: Volume I. Tactical and Staff Duties Division, Admiralty. 1947. Part I: Preparation, Part II: Execution.
- Battle Summary - No. 39: Operation "Neptune" Landings in Normandy June 1944: Volume II: Appendices. Tactical and Staff Duties Division, Admiralty. 1947. part 1 of 2: Appendix A to G, part 2 of 2: Appendix H to Q.
- Colledge, J. J.; Warlow, Ben (2006) [1969]. Ships of the Royal Navy: The Complete Record of All Fighting Ships of the Royal Navy from the 15th Century to the Present (3rd Rev ed.). London: Chatham Publishing. ISBN 978-1-86176-281-8. OCLC 67375475.
- Critchley, Mike (1982). British Warships Since 1945: Part 3: Destroyers. Liskeard, UK: Maritime Books. ISBN 0-9506323-9-2.
- English, John (2008). Obdurate to Daring: British Fleet Destroyers 1941–45. Windsor, UK: World Ship Society. ISBN 978-0-9560769-0-8.
- Friedman, Norman (2008). British Destroyers & Frigates: The Second World War and After. Barnsley, UK: Seaforth Publishing. ISBN 978-1-84832-015-4.
- Gardiner, Robert; Chesneau, Roger, eds. (1980). Conway's All The World's Fighting Ships 1922–1946. London: Conway Maritime Press. ISBN 0-85177-146-7.
- O'Hara, Vincent (2011). The German Fleet at War, 1939–1945. Annapolis, Maryland, US: Naval Institute Press. ISBN 978-1-61251-397-3.
- H.M. Ships Damaged or Sunk by Enemy Action: 3rd. SEPT. 1939 to 2nd. SEPT. 1945. Admiralty. 1952.
- Lenton, H. T. (1970). Navies of the Second World War: British Fleet & Escort Destroyers Volume Two. London: Macdonald & Co. ISBN 0-356-03122-5.
- Manning, T. D.; Walker, C. F. (1959). British Warship Names. London: Putnam.
- Raven, Alan; Roberts, John (1976). War Built Destroyers O to Z Classes. London: Bivouac Books. ISBN 0-85680-010-4.
- Rohwer, Jürgen; Hümmelchen, Gerhard (1992). Chronology of the War at Sea 1939–1945. London: Greenhill Books. ISBN 1-85367-117-7.
- Roskill, S. W. (1961). The War At Sea 1939–1945: Volume III: The Offensive: Part II. History of the Second World War: United Kingdom Military Series. London: Her Majesty's Stationery Office.
- Ruegg, Bob; Hague, Arnold (1993). Convoys to Russia 1941–1945. Kendal, UK: World Ship Society. ISBN 0-905617-66-5.
- "Section 1 - Sonar Equipment: 1.1 - Submarine Sets: Active/Passive Sonar Type 2001 for H.M.S Dreadnought and H.M.S. Valiant" (PDF). Scientific and Technical Progress Report. Admiralty Underwater Weapons Establishment: 1–5. June 1963.
- Stewart, Ninian (2002). The Royal Navy and the Palestine Patrol. Routledge. ISBN 0-714-65210-5.
- Whitley, M. J. (1988). Destroyers of World War 2. Annapolis, Maryland: Naval Institute Press. ISBN 0-87021-326-1.
- Whitley, M. J. (2000). Destroyers of World War 2: An International Encyclopedia. London: Cassell & Co. ISBN 1-85409-521-8.
- Winser, John de S. (1994). The D-Day Ships: Neptune: the Greatest Amphibious Operation in History. Kendal, UK: World Ship Society. ISBN 0-905617-75-4.
- Winser, John de S. (2002). British Invasion Fleets: The Mediterranean and beyond 1942–1945. Gravesend, UK: World Ship Society. ISBN 0-9543310-0-1.
