= HMS Virago (R75) =

V-class destroyer converted to Type 15 frigate of the Royal Navy

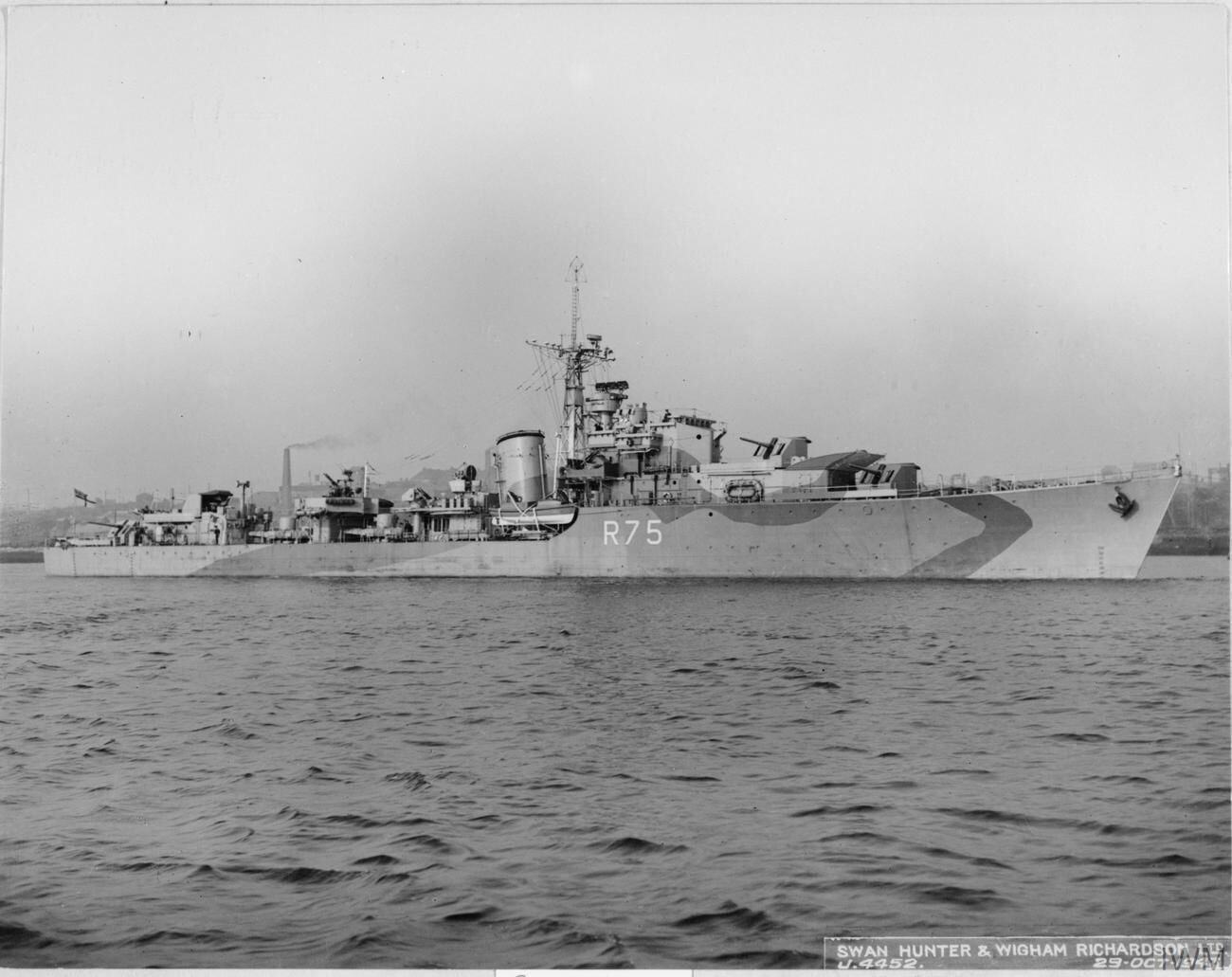
- Virago at anchor on the River Tyne, October 1943

History

United Kingdom
- Name: HMS Virago
- Ordered: 1 September 1941
- Builder: Swan Hunter, Tyne and Wear, United Kingdom
- Laid down: 16 February 1942
- Launched: 4 February 1943
- Commissioned: 5 November 1943
- Decommissioned: 1963
- Identification: Pennant number R75/F76
- Honours and awards: Arctic 1943-44; North Cape 1943; Normandy 1944; Malaya 1945; Burma 1945
- Fate: Scrapped 4 June 1965

General characteristics V-class destroyer
- Class & type: V-class destroyer
- Displacement: 1,777 long tons (1,806 t) standard; 2,058 long tons (2,091 t) full load
- Length: 363 ft (111 m)
- Beam: 35 ft 8 in (10.87 m)
- Draught: 10 ft (3.0 m)
- Propulsion: 2 × Admiralty 3-drum water-tube boilers; Geared steam turbines, 40,000 shp (29,828 kW); 2 shafts
- Speed: 37 knots (43 mph; 69 km/h)
- Range: 4,860 nmi (9,000 km) at 29 kn (54 km/h)
- Complement: 180 (225 in flotilla leader)
- Armament: Original configuration : 4 × QF 4.7-inch (120-mm) Mk XII guns in single mountings CP Mk.XXII; 2 × QF 40 mm Bofors guns in twin mount Mk.IV; 6 × QF 20 mm Oerlikon guns; 2 × twin mounts Mk.V, 2 × single mounts Mk.III; 2 × quadruple tubes for 21 in (533 mm) torpedo Mk.IX

General characteristics Type 15 frigate
- Class & type: Type 15 frigate
- Displacement: 2,300 long tons (2,337 t) standard
- Length: 358 ft (109 m) o/a
- Beam: 37 ft 9 in (11.51 m)
- Draught: 14 ft 6 in (4.42 m)
- Propulsion: 2 × Admiralty 3-drum boilers, steam turbines on 2 shafts, 40,000 shp
- Speed: 31 knots (36 mph; 57 km/h) (full load)
- Complement: 174
- Sensors & processing systems: Radar; Type 293Q target indication (later Type 993); Type 277Q surface search; Type 974 navigation; Type 262 fire control on director CRBF; Type 1010 Cossor Mark 10 IFF; Sonar: Type 174 search; Type 162 target classification; Type 170 attack
- Armament: 1 × twin 4 in gun Mark 19; 1 × twin 40mm Bofors Mk.5; 2 × Squid A/S mortar or; 2 × Limbo Mark 10 A/S mortar

HMS Virago was a V-class destroyer of the British Royal Navy that served in World War II. She was later converted into a Type 15 fast anti-submarine frigate, with the new pennant number F76.

== Second World War service ==
=== Arctic convoys ===
In addition to escorting the perilous Arctic convoys during 1943–44, Virago participated with other British destroyers in the Battle of North Cape on 26 December 1943, where her torpedoes helped sink the badly beaten German battleship Scharnhorst, following a fierce fight between the Germans and the battleship Duke of York. On 30 January 1944, while escorting Convoy JW 56B to Murmansk, Virago rescued 78 men from the stricken HMS Hardy, whose stern had been blown off by an acoustic torpedo (resulting in 35 casualties). Following a bow collision between the two ships, Virago disengaged and HMS Venus rescued the rest of the crew and her officers (and then scuttled Hardy). On 3 April 1944 Virago escorted the carrier HMS Searcher during Operation Tungsten, which was an inconclusive air attack on the German battleship Tirpitz at her base in Kaafjord in the far north of Norway.

=== Normandy landings ===
During the invasion of Normandy on 6 June 1944 she fired on German positions behind Lion-sur-Mer on Sword Beach, and later gave cover fire for troops advancing inland. Virago remained off the coast of Normandy at various stations providing support for the invasion force until 6 July, when she departed and resumed operations off Norway and with the Arctic convoys through the end of September.

=== Far East ===
Transferred to the Eastern Fleet in January 1945. On 26 March 1945 she, along with the destroyers Saumarez, Volage, and Vigilant, intercepted a Japanese supply convoy east of Khota Andaman, Andaman Islands in the Indian Ocean. She and Vigilant sank the Japanese submarine chaser CH-34.

She patrolled the Malacca Strait and supported Operation Dracula off the coast of Burma in late April 1945 as part of the 21st Aircraft Carrier Squadron. Virago subsequently participated in the Battle of the Malacca Strait with Saumarez, Verulam, Venus and Vigilant which culminated in the sinking of the Japanese heavy cruiser Haguro in the early morning of 16 May 1945. This was a textbook destroyer night action, and was the last naval gun battle of the Second World War. Later in the afternoon of 16 May, Virago was ordered to refuel from the carrier HMS Hunter. As the two ships closed, they were suddenly bombed by Japanese aircraft in a surprise attack and splinters from a near miss killed five of Virago's crew (Hunter was unscathed). These were the only casualties on board Virago during the entire war. Virago subsequently participated in preparations for Operation Zipper (the invasion of Malaya) in July/August 1945, and its eventual execution as a reoccupation manoeuvre in September 1945 following the surrender of Japan. Based in Hong Kong with the British Pacific Fleet after VJ day, Virago returned to Chatham, Kent in December 1945.

Throughout her wartime commission, Virago was under the command of Lt. Cdr. Archibald John Ramsay White (1910-1991).

== Post War service ==
Between 1946 and 1949 Virago was part of the 3rd Destroyer Flotilla, based in the Mediterranean. On 2 August 1946 the British oil tanker Empire Cross exploded, burned and sank in Haifa Roads, Palestine, killing 25 people. Virago and Venus took part in the rescue of survivors. Venus and Virago had been dropping depth charges in the area to deter Haganah frogmen from planting limpet mines. A depth charge dropped by Virago was suspected of having caused the explosion. An inquest was held, at which the page in Virago's logbook for that day was found to be missing. However, the Admiralty dismissed the idea that a depth charge could have caused the explosion.

On 19 September 1946, gunfire from Virago was used to scuttle the forward half of the wreck of Ohio, the tanker which had played a pivotal role in the Siege of Malta.

Between 1949 and 1951 she was held in reserve at Chatham Dockyard. Between 1951 and 1953 she was converted to a Type 15 frigate at Chatham Dockyard. On re-commissioning in 1953 she became part of the 6th Frigate Squadron and in that year took part in the Fleet Review to celebrate the Coronation of Queen Elizabeth II.

Between 1955 and 1960 she was held in reserve at Chatham Dockyard. Between 1962 and 1963 she was part of the Dartmouth Training Squadron.

== Decommissioning and disposal ==
Virago was decommissioned in 1963 and held in reserve at Devonport. She arrived in Faslane for breaking up in June 1965.
