= HMS Urchin (R99) =

U-class destroyer converted to Type 15 frigate of the Royal Navy

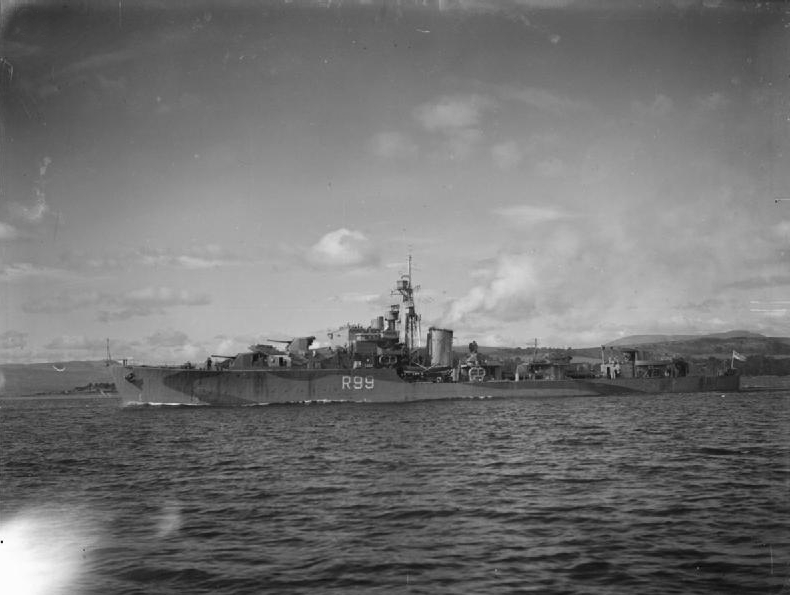
- Urchin off Greenock, September 1943

History

United Kingdom
- Name: HMS Urchin
- Builder: Vickers-Armstrongs
- Laid down: 28 March 1942
- Launched: 8 March 1943
- Commissioned: 24 September 1943
- Decommissioned: 1964
- Identification: Pennant number R99/F196
- Fate: Scrapped 1967

General characteristics V-class destroyer
- Class & type: V-class destroyer
- Displacement: 1,777 long tons (1,806 t) standard; 2,058 long tons (2,091 t) full load
- Length: 363 ft (111 m)
- Beam: 35 ft 8 in (10.87 m)
- Draught: 10 ft (3.0 m)
- Propulsion: 2 × Admiralty 3-drum water-tube boilers; Geared steam turbines, 40,000 shp (29,828 kW); 2 shafts
- Speed: 37 knots (43 mph; 69 km/h)
- Range: 4,860 nmi (9,000 km) at 29 kn (54 km/h)
- Complement: 180 (225 in flotilla leader)
- Armament: Original configuration : 4 × QF 4.7-inch (120-mm) Mk XII guns in single mountings CP Mk.XXII; 2 × QF 40 mm Bofors guns in twin mount Mk.IV; 6 × QF 20 mm Oerlikon guns; 2 × twin mounts Mk.V, 2 × single mounts Mk.III; 2 × quadruple tubes for 21 in (533 mm) torpedo Mk.IX

General characteristics Type 15 frigate
- Class & type: Type 15 frigate
- Displacement: 2,300 long tons (2,337 t) standard
- Length: 358 ft (109 m) o/a
- Beam: 37 ft 9 in (11.51 m)
- Draught: 14 ft 6 in (4.42 m)
- Propulsion: 2 × Admiralty 3-drum boilers, steam turbines on 2 shafts, 40,000 shp
- Speed: 31 knots (36 mph; 57 km/h) (full load)
- Complement: 174
- Sensors & processing systems: Radar; Type 293Q target indication (later Type 993); Type 277Q surface search; Type 974 navigation; Type 262 fire control on director CRBF; Type 1010 Cossor Mark 10 IFF; Sonar: Type 174 search; Type 162 target classification; Type 170 attack
- Armament: 1 × twin 4 in gun Mark 19; 1 × twin 40mm Bofors Mk.5; 2 × Squid A/S mortar or; 2 × Limbo Mark 10 A/S mortar

HMS Urchin was a U-class destroyer of the British Royal Navy that saw service during the Second World War.

== Service history ==
=== Second World War service ===
Urchin formed part of the British Pacific Fleet during the latter part of the War.

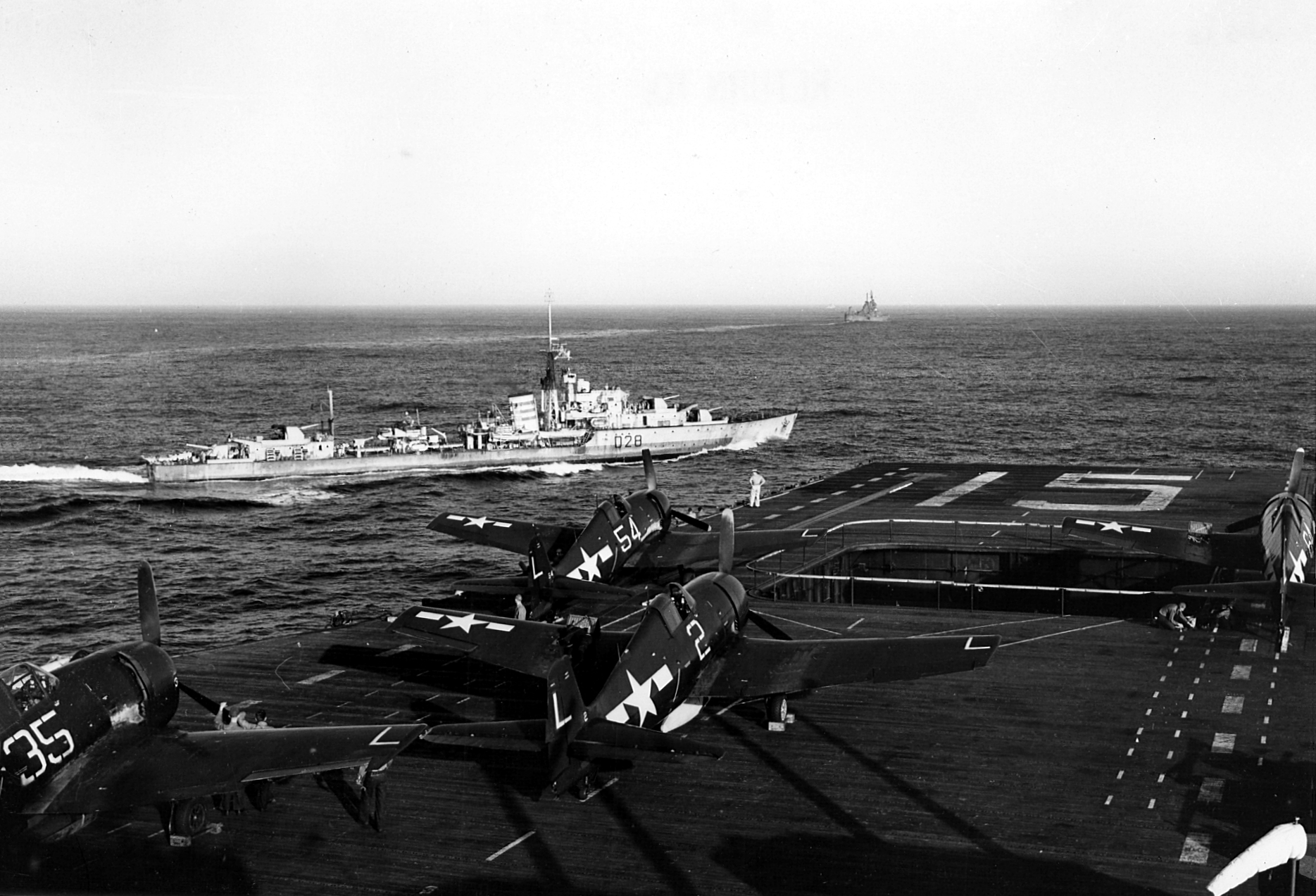
Urchin wearing the BPF pennant "D28", as seen from the aircraft carrier USS Randolph off Japan in August 1945.

=== Post War service ===
Following service in the Second World War Urchin was held in reserve at Harwich, then Chatham Dockyard until 1952. Between 1952 and 1954 she was converted into a Type 15 fast anti-submarine frigate, by Barclay Curle, Glasgow. Following this she was allocated the new pennant number F196. She re-commissioned on 3 June 1954 into the 3rd Training Squadron, based at Londonderry.

In 1956 she went back into reserve at Portsmouth Dockyard. In 1957 she was refitted as a training frigate and re-commissioned for service with the Dartmouth Training Squadron. She subsequently served off Iceland during the 'Cod wars' in 1959.

=== Decommissioning and disposal ===
Urchin was decommissioned in 1964 and placed on the Disposal List. Before sale for breaking-up her stern structure was removed and fitted to sister ship Ulster during 1966. The hulk was later towed to Troon, where she arrived in August 1967 for demolition.

== Publications ==
- History of HMS Urchin at naval-history.net
- Colledge, J. J.; Warlow, Ben (2006) [1969]. Ships of the Royal Navy: The Complete Record of All Fighting Ships of the Royal Navy from the 15th Century to the Present (3rd Rev ed.). London: Chatham Publishing. ISBN 978-1-86176-281-8. OCLC 67375475.
- Marriott, Leo (1994). Royal Navy Destroyers since 1945. Ian Allan. ISBN 0-7110-1817-0.
- Raven, Alan; Roberts, John (1978). War Built Destroyers O to Z Classes. London: Bivouac Books. ISBN 0-85680-010-4.
- Richardson, Ian (August 2021). Osborne, Richard (ed.). "Type 15 Frigates, Part 2: Ship Histories". Warships: Marine News Supplement. 75 (8): 381–391. ISSN 0966-6958.
- Whitley, M. J. (1988). Destroyers of World War 2. Annapolis, Maryland: Naval Institute Press. ISBN 0-87021-326-1.
