= 17th Frigate Squadron =

- Active: November 1955 – February 1972
- Country: United Kingdom
- Branch: Royal Navy
- Size: Squadron

Commanders
- First: Captain John E. Scotland
- Last: Captain Wilfred J. Graham

The 17th Frigate Squadron was an administrative unit of the Royal Navy from 1955 to 1972.

== Operational history ==
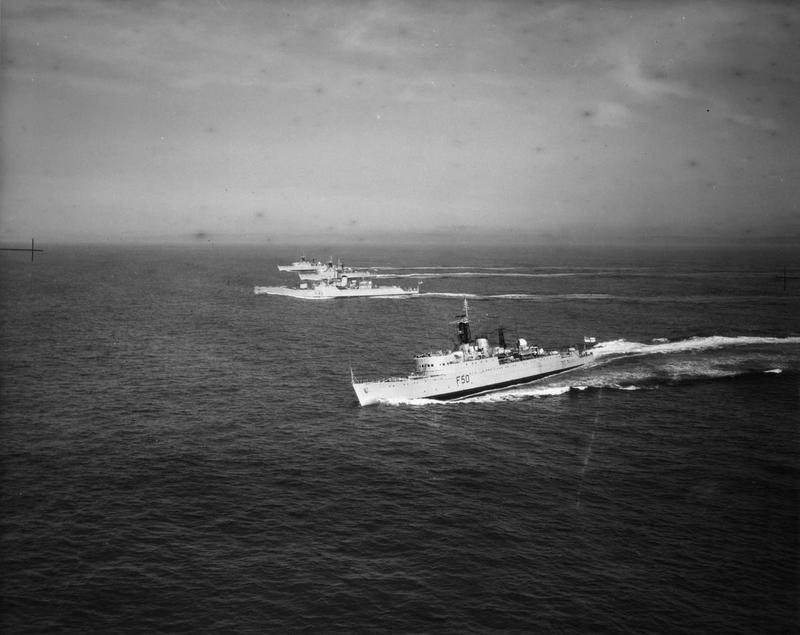
17th Frigate Squadron featuring the V-class HMS Venus, the Whitby-class HMS Torquay and the Type 15 HMS Urchin and HMS Wizard in March 1963 (IWM)

During its existence, the squadron included Type 15 and Whitby-class frigates. The squadron served as the Dartmouth Training Squadron for cadets at Britannia Royal Naval College.

The main task of the squadron was to train officer cadets in basic ship experience. Sea time experience was given also to young Royal Marine officers and Engine Room Artificer apprentices. There were three cruises a year which coincided with the terms at Dartmouth College. These cruises usually alternated between the Mediterranean and the Baltic. The squadron was disbanded in 1972.

== Squadron commander ==
Commander	Ship	Dates
Captain John E. Scotland	HMS Vigilant	November 1955-April 1957
Captain Morgan C. Giles	HMS Vigilant	April 1957-December 1958
Captain Peter N. Howes	HMS Vigilant	December 1958-August 1960
Captain Peter Ashmore	HMS Roebuck	August 1960-December 1961
Captain Terence T. Lewin	HMS Urchin	December 1961-August 1963
Captain North E.F. Dalrymple-Hamilton	Nonsuch	August 1963-December 1964
Captain Christopher B.H. Wake-Walker	HMS Tenby/HMS Eastbourne	December 1964-August 1966
Captain Ronald Forrest	HMS Torquay	August 1966-December 1967
Captain Ian S. S. Mackay	Eastbourne	December 1967-July 1969
Captain O. Nigel A. Cecil	HMS Tenby/HMS Scarborough	July 1969-February 1971
Captain Wilfred J. Graham	Nonsuch	February 1971-1972

== See also ==
- List of squadrons and flotillas of the Royal Navy
