= Type 15 frigate =

1951 class of frigates of the Royal Navy

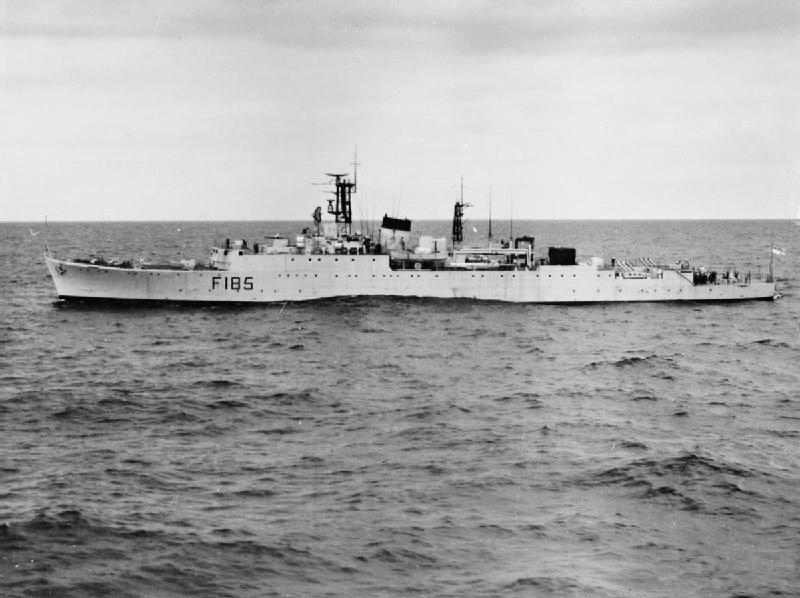
- HMS Relentless after her Type 15 conversion

Class overview
- Name: Type 15
- Operators: Royal Navy; South African Navy; Royal Australian Navy; Royal Canadian Navy
- In service: 1951–1977
- Completed: 23
- Retired: 23

General characteristics
- Type: Frigate
- Displacement: 2,300 long tons (2,337 t) standard; 2,700 long tons (2,743 t) full load
- Length: 358 ft (109 m) o/a
- Beam: 37 ft 9 in (11.51 m)
- Draught: 14 ft 6 in (4.42 m)
- Propulsion: 2 × Admiralty 3-drum boilers; Steam turbines on 2 shafts; 40,000 shp (30 MW)
- Speed: 31 knots (57 km/h; 36 mph) (full load)
- Complement: 174
- Sensors & processing systems: Radar; Type 293Q target indication.; Type 277Q surface search; Type 974 navigation; Type 262 fire control on director CRBF; Type 1010 Cossor Mark 10 IFF; Sonar: Type 174 search; Type 162 target classification; Type 170 attack
- Armament: 1 × twin 4 in (102 mm) Mark 19 gun; 1 × twin 40mm Bofors Mk.5; 2 × Squid or Limbo Mark 10 anti-submarine mortars
- Aviation facilities: Flight deck on Grenville and Undaunted

The Type 15 frigate was a class of British anti-submarine frigates of the Royal Navy. They were conversions based on the hulls of World War II-era destroyers built to the standard War Emergency Programme "utility" design.

== History ==
By 1945 the wartime "utility" vessels were obsolescent as destroyers due to their relatively small size and makeshift armament. Future construction would be based on ever larger vessels, such as the Battle class and Daring class. Rapid advances in German U-boat technology with the 17-knot (31 km/h; 20 mph) Type XXI and 19-knot (35 km/h; 22 mph) Type XXVI rendered even some of the most modern Royal Navy escorts obsolete. This technology was being put into production by the Soviet Navy in the form of the Whiskey-class submarine. The Royal Navy began designing and constructing new fast anti-submarine frigates of the Type 12 and Type 14 design to counter this threat. However, it would be some time before these vessels could be brought into service and budget constraints limited the number of new hulls that could be constructed.

The solution to the problem lay in the 47 War Emergency Programme destroyers that remained in Royal Navy service, most of which were only a few years old and had seen little active service. Accordingly, plans were drawn up to convert these vessels into fast anti-submarine frigates incorporating as many lessons learned during wartime experience as possible. Ultimately, 23 of the utility destroyers were fully converted into Type 15 first-rate anti-submarine frigates, and a further ten were given limited conversions, and designated Type 16 frigates.

The US Navy followed suit in 1960–65, with the "FRAM" programme, by which Fletcher, Allen M. Sumner and Gearing-class destroyers were progressively upgraded, pending the arrival of new Knox-class frigates and Spruance-class destroyers in 1969.

== Conversion ==
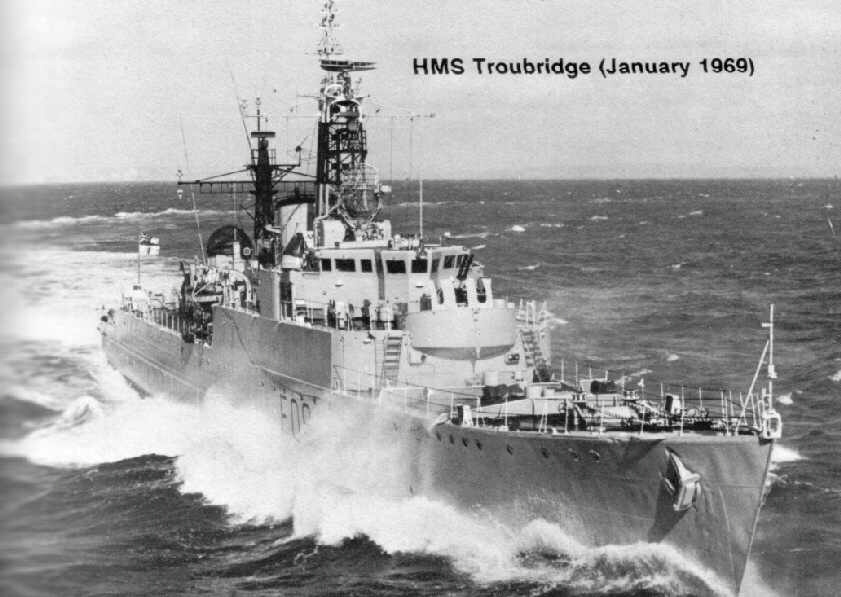
Late-conversion HMS Troubridge with the revised bridge

The superstructure had a low profile to limit the effects of blast from nuclear explosions. The forward superstructure extended across the ship, with the front curved and reinforced to resist the impact of waves at 25 knots in rough weather. The forecastle was extended aft to provide additional internal volume. The bridge was at forecastle deck level. The operations room was behind and slightly below the bridge to provide sight from the bridge's rear windows. The ship's wheel and radio room were underneath as there was no room at forecastle deck level.

The ship was designed to be fought while sealed against CBRN effects; a periscope for the captain and plastic bubbles for lookouts were included. Command and control was supposed to be from the operations rooms instead of from the bridge. In practice, an experienced officer had to be on the bridge for safety, particularly when manoeuvring at high-speed with nearby ships. The last ships raised the bridge one level to improve ship handling; the Bofor guns were moved to the front of the superstructure to accommodate the new bridge location.

All of the minor transverse bulkheads were new additions.

Diesel power generation capacity was increased from 100 kW to 350 kW; capacity was limited by volume in the machinery spaces for survivability. Fuel capacity was reduced by the new 4 inch magazine, but estimated range exceeded requirements. Agouti propeller silencing was added, which increased ship life by up to 25 years.

The radars were the target indicating Type 293Q and surface search Type 277Q. The Type 170 and 172 sonars were fitted.

A twin 4-inch gun was mounted aft; on the forecastle it would be too wet and block the bridge's view. The heavy steam plant prevented the use of the twin 4.5 inch gun. The twin Bofors was initially placed on top of the bridge. Fire control was "austere"; there was a Close Range Blind-Fire director for the 4-inch guns and a Simple Tachymetric Director for the Bofors. The Bofors' optical and radar directors were amalgamated to provide space and weight for the Type 277Q.

The ships were initially fitted with Squid ASW mortars; not all may have had Squid replaced by the intended two Limbos. The original concept was for three fixed torpedo tubes on each side with twelve torpedoes; by 1949, larger ASW torpedoes reduced this to two tubes on each side with eight reloads, and then to eight tubes without reloads between the 4-inch gun and the funnel. The intended torpedoes did not materialise and the torpedoes were deleted in 1953. Only HMS Ulster was fitted with the tubes for trials.

HMS Grenville performed trials with an aft flight deck and a Fairey Ultra-light Helicopter after completing a refit in December 1956. HMS Undaunted performed the first direction of a helicopter—a Saunders Roe P531—using sensor data in late-1959.

== Ships ==
In 1949–1950, there were 27 conversions planned between 1949 and 1957. When the Korean War started, this changed to 24, to be completed by 1954. By mid-1951, 22 conversions were planned. Another ship was later added; it was originally to be converted into a Type 16 frigate. The Navy's 1954 internal strategy review resulted in a recommendation to cancel six conversions due to obsolescence. The programme encountered delays and the conversion of the 23 ships was completed in 1956.

Name	Pennant	Converted	Fate
R class conversion
Rapid	F138	Alex Stephens & Sons, Glasgow, 1952–1953	Sunk as target, 1981
Relentless	F185	Royal Dockyard, Portsmouth, 1949–1951	Broken up, 1971
Rocket	F193	Royal Dockyard, Devonport, 1949–1951	Broken up, 1967
Roebuck	F195	Royal Dockyard, Devonport, 1952–1953	Broken up, 1968
T class conversion
Troubridge	F09	Royal Dockyard, Portsmouth / J. Samuel White, Cowes, 1955–1957	Broken up, 1970
U and V class conversion
Grenville	F197	Royal Dockyard, Chatham, 1953–1954	Paid off 1974. Broken up 1983
Ulster	F83	Royal Dockyard, Chatham, 1953–1956	Training hulk, 1977. Broken up 1981
Ulysses	F17	Royal Dockyard, Devonport, 1952–1953	Broken up, 1970
Undaunted	F53	J. Samuel White, Cowes, 1953–1954	Sunk as Exocet missile- and Tigerfish torpedo-target in 1978
Undine	F141	J. I. Thornycroft, Woolston, Hampshire, 1954	Broken up, 1965
Urania	F08	Harland & Wolff, Liverpool, 1953–1954	Broken up, 1971
Urchin	F196	Barclay Curle, Glasgow, 1952–1954	Scrapped 1966 to repair HMS Ulster
Ursa	F200	Palmers Shipbuilding, Jarrow, 1953–1954	Scrapped 1967
Venus	F50	Royal Dockyard, Devonport, 1952–1954	Scrapped 1972
Verulam	F29	Royal Dockyard, Portsmouth, 1952	Scrapped 1972
Vigilant	F93	J. I. Thornycroft, Woolston, 1951–1952	Scrapped 1965
Virago	F76	J. Samuel White, Cowes, 1951–1952	Scrapped 1972
Volage	F41	Royal Dockyard, Chatham, 1952–1953	Sold for scrap 28 October 1972
W and Z class conversion
Wakeful	F159	Scotts Shipbuilders, Greenock, 1952–1953	Used as radar training ship and for satellite communications trials. Scrapped 1971
Whirlwind	F187	Palmers Shipbuilding, Jarrow, 1953–1954	Paid off 1974. Foundered while in use as a target ship in 1974.
Wizard	F72	Royal Dockyard, Devonport, 1954	Broken up 1967
Wrangler	F157	Harland & Wolff, Belfast, 1951–1952	Sold to South African Navy as SAS Vrystaat 1957, sunk as target 1976
Zest	F102	Royal Dockyard, Chatham, 1954–1956	Broken up, 1970

== Type 15s in film and models ==
HMS Wakeful and HMS Troubridge were both used in the filming of the 1965 cold-war drama The Bedford Incident, to depict the fictional "USS Bedford". The main exterior shots used a large model of a US Farragut-class destroyer, but Wakeful's Type 15 outline and F159 pennant number are clearly visible in the opening sequence, when Sidney Poitier arrives in a Whirlwind helicopter. Many of the interior shots were filmed in Troubridge, and British military equipment, including a rack of Lee–Enfield rifles and Troubridge's novel forward-sloping bridge windows, can be seen.

In 1959 Triang Minic Ships produced a series of 1:1200 (one inch to 100 feet) metal models of Type 15 frigates, carrying the names Vigilant, Venus, Virago and Volage; the first two have open bridges, while the others' are closed. These toys were mass-produced between 1959 and 1965, and did much to raise awareness of the post-war Navy for the younger generation. At the same time the Frog (models) company produced an accurate plastic model kit of HMS Undine to a scale of 1:500. The moulds for this were sold to Russia in 1976, and it has been re-issued under the "Novo" trademark on several occasions. More recently, Uk company MT Miniatures has produced a 1:700th scale model of HMS Relentless in resin, white metal, and photo-etched brass.

== See also ==
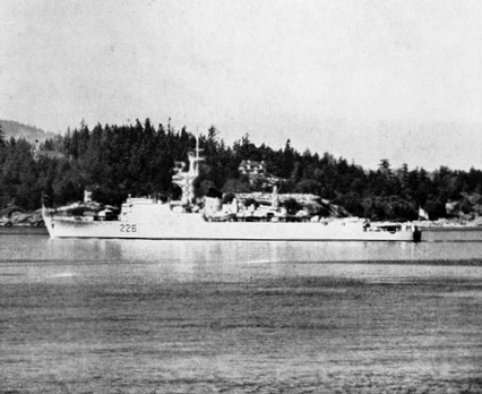
Canadian type 15 conversion HMCS Crescent

- War Emergency Programme destroyers: The destroyer building programme that the Type 15 frigates were converted from
- Type 16 frigate: A more limited conversion of destroyer hulls than the Type 15
- HMCS Algonquin, HMCS Crescent and HMCS Crusader were converted into similar ships for the Royal Canadian Navy.
- The Royal Australian Navy converted four out of five of their Q-class destroyers to Type 15 frigates from 1953 to 1957. The other ship, HMAS Quality, was scrapped in 1958.

== Sources ==
- Friedman, Norman (2006). British Destroyers and Frigates: The Second World War and After. London: Chatham Publishing. ISBN 1861761376.
