= HMS Vigilant (R93) =

V-class destroyer converted to Type 15 frigate of the Royal Navy

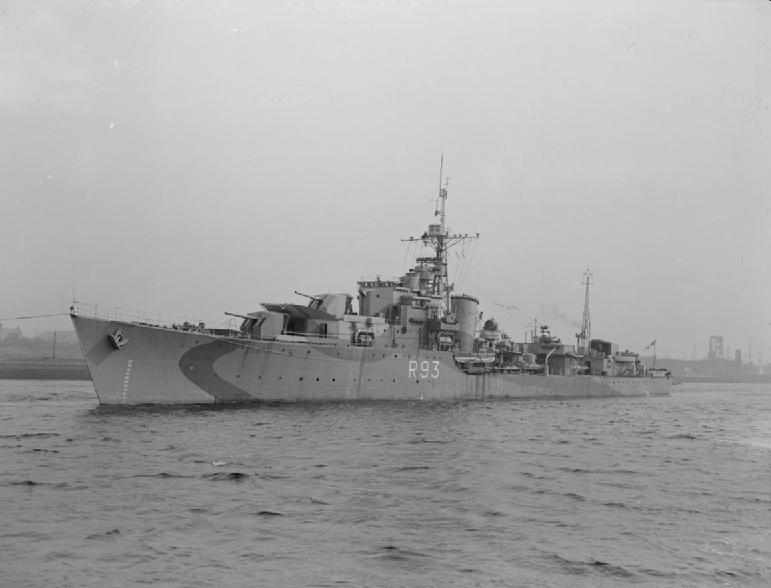
- Vigilant on the River Tyne, September 1943

History

United Kingdom
- Name: HMS Vigilant
- Ordered: 1 September 1941
- Builder: Swan Hunter, Tyne and Wear, United Kingdom
- Laid down: 31 January 1942
- Launched: 22 December 1942
- Commissioned: 10 September 1943
- Decommissioned: 1963
- Identification: Pennant number R93/F93
- Honours and awards: Arctic 1943-44; Normandy 1944; Malaya 1945; Burma 1945
- Fate: Scrapped 6 June 1965

General characteristics V-class destroyer
- Class & type: V-class destroyer
- Displacement: 1,777 long tons (1,806 t) standard; 2,058 long tons (2,091 t) full load
- Length: 363 ft (111 m)
- Beam: 35 ft 8 in (10.87 m)
- Draught: 10 ft (3.0 m)
- Propulsion: 2 × Admiralty 3-drum water-tube boilers; Geared steam turbines, 40,000 shp (29,828 kW); 2 shafts
- Speed: 37 knots (43 mph; 69 km/h)
- Range: 4,860 nmi (9,000 km) at 29 kn (54 km/h)
- Complement: 180 (225 in flotilla leader)
- Armament: Original configuration : 4 × QF 4.7-inch (120-mm) Mk XII guns in single mountings CP Mk.XXII; 2 × QF 40 mm Bofors guns in twin mount Mk.IV; 6 × QF 20 mm Oerlikon guns; 2 × twin mounts Mk.V, 2 × single mounts Mk.III; 2 × quadruple tubes for 21 in (533 mm) torpedo Mk.IX

General characteristics Type 15 frigate
- Class & type: Type 15 frigate
- Displacement: 2,300 long tons (2,337 t) standard
- Length: 358 ft (109 m) o/a
- Beam: 37 ft 9 in (11.51 m)
- Draught: 14 ft 6 in (4.42 m)
- Propulsion: 2 × Admiralty 3-drum boilers, steam turbines on 2 shafts, 40,000 shp
- Speed: 31 knots (36 mph; 57 km/h) (full load)
- Complement: 174
- Sensors & processing systems: Radar; Type 293Q target indication (later Type 993); Type 277Q surface search; Type 974 navigation; Type 262 fire control on director CRBF; Type 1010 Cossor Mark 10 IFF; Sonar: Type 174 search; Type 162 target classification; Type 170 attack
- Armament: 1 × twin 4 in gun Mark 19; 1 × twin 40mm Bofors Mk.5; 2 × Squid A/S mortar or; 2 × Limbo Mark 10 A/S mortar

HMS Vigilant was a V-class destroyer of the British Royal Navy that saw service during World War II.

== Second World War service ==
On 26 March 1945 she, along with the destroyers Saumarez, Volage, and Virago, intercepted a Japanese supply convoy east of Khota Andaman, Andaman Islands in the Indian Ocean. She and Virago sank CH-63. Also part of the escorting destroyers of the 21st Aircraft Carrier Squadron involved in Operation Dracula from April to May 1945. She participated in the Battle of the Malacca Strait with the destroyers Saumarez, Verulam, Venus, and Virago which culminated in the sinking of the Japanese cruiser Haguro on 16 May 1945.

== Post-War service ==
In January 1946 Vigilant was part of the Londonderry Flotilla and in September 1946 went to the Mediterranean. Between 1947 and 1951 she was held in reserve at Portsmouth.

In 1951 she began conversion into a Type 15 fast anti-submarine frigate, by Thornycroft at Woolston. She was also allocated the new pennant number F93. Between 1953 and 1955 she was part of the 6th Frigate Squadron as part of the Home Fleet. In October 1954 she collided with another Type 15 Frigate HMS Relentless and was repaired at Devonport Dockyard.

In 1955 she had been converted for use as a training frigate and became leader of the Dartmouth Training Squadron. In 1956 this consisted of Vigilant, Venus, Carron and the minesweepers Jewel and Acute.

== Decommissioning and disposal ==
Vigilant was paid off in 1963 and arrived at Faslane for breaking up on 4 June 1965.

== Publications ==
- Colledge, J. J.; Warlow, Ben (2006) [1969]. Ships of the Royal Navy: The Complete Record of All Fighting Ships of the Royal Navy from the 15th Century to the Present (3rd Rev ed.). London: Chatham Publishing. ISBN 978-1-86176-281-8. OCLC 67375475.
- Marriott, Leo (1994). Royal Navy Destroyers since 1945. Ian Allan. ISBN 0-7110-1817-0.
- Raven, Alan; Roberts, John (1978). War Built Destroyers O to Z Classes. London: Bivouac Books. ISBN 0-85680-010-4.
- Whitley, M. J. (1988). Destroyers of World War 2. Annapolis, Maryland: Naval Institute Press. ISBN 0-87021-326-1.
