= U and V-class destroyer =

Class of destroyers of the Royal Navy

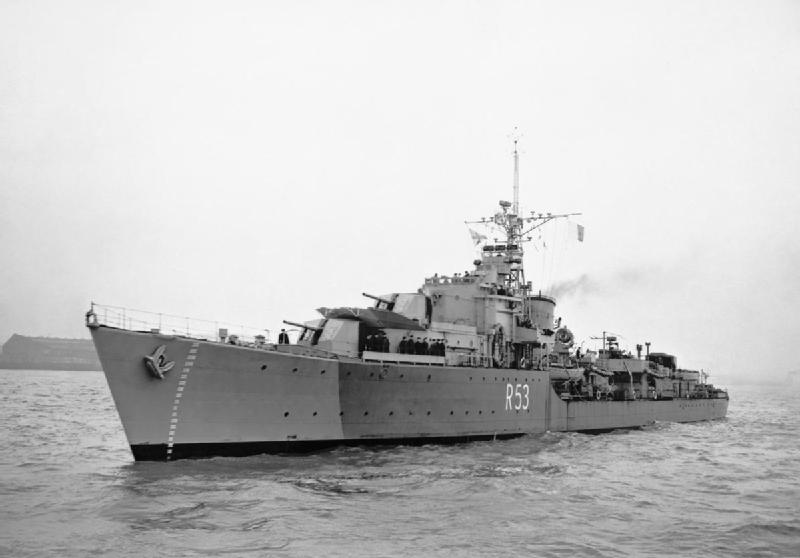
- HMS Undaunted in 1944

Class overview
- Name: U and V class
- Builders: John Brown & Company; Cammell Laird; Fairfield Shipbuilding and Engineering Company; J. Samuel White; Swan Hunter; John I. Thornycroft and Company; Vickers-Armstrongs
- Operators: Royal Navy; Royal Canadian Navy
- Preceded by: S and T class
- Succeeded by: W and Z class
- Built: 1941–1944
- In commission: 1943–1982
- Completed: 16
- Lost: 1

General characteristics
- Type: Destroyer
- Displacement: 1,777 long tons (1,806 t) standard; 2,058 long tons (2,091 t) full load
- Length: 363 ft (111 m)
- Beam: 35 ft 8 in (10.87 m)
- Draught: 10 ft (3.0 m)
- Propulsion: 2 × Admiralty 3-drum water-tube boilers; Geared steam turbines, 40,000 shp (29,828 kW); 2 shafts
- Speed: 36.75 knots (42.3 mph; 68.1 km/h)
- Range: 4,860 nmi (9,000 km) at 20 kn (37 km/h)
- Complement: 180 (225 in flotilla leader)
- Armament: Original configuration : 4 × QF 4.7-inch (120-mm) Mk IX guns in single mountings CP Mk.XXII; 2 × QF 40 mm Bofors guns in twin mount Mk.IV; 6 × QF 20 mm Oerlikon guns; 2 × twin mounts Mk.V, 2 × single mounts Mk.III; 2 × quadruple tubes for 21-inch (533 mm) torpedoes Mk.IX

The U and V class was a class of sixteen destroyers of the Royal Navy launched in 1942–1943. They were constructed in two flotillas, each with names beginning with "U-" or "V-" (although there was a return to the pre-war practice of naming the designated flotilla leader after a famous naval figure from history to honour the lost ships Grenville and Hardy). The hull was nearly identical to the preceding ships of the S and T classes, but the U and V class ships had different bridge and armament fits. The flotillas constituted the 7th Emergency Flotilla and 8th Emergency Flotilla, built under the War Emergency Programme. These ships used the Fuze Keeping Clock HA Fire Control Computer.

== Notable actions ==
Four ships, Verulam, Venus, Vigilant and Virago, formed part of the 26th Destroyer Flotilla that ambushed and sank the Japanese cruiser Haguro, off Sumatra.

== U class ==
- Grenville, flotilla leader, built by Swan Hunter, Tyneside, laid down 1 November 1941, launched 12 October 1942, and completed 27 May 1943.
- Ulster, built by Swan Hunter, laid down 12 November 1941, launched 9 November 1942, and completed 30 June 1943.
- Ulysses, built by Cammell Laird, Birkenhead, laid down 14 March 1942, launched 22 April 1943, and completed 23 December 1943.
- Undaunted, built by Cammell Laird, laid down 8 September 1942, launched 19 July 1943, and completed 3 March 1944.
- Undine, built by John I. Thornycroft and Company, Woolston, laid down 18 March 1942, launched 1 June 1943, and completed 23 December 1943.
- Ursa, built by John I. Thornycroft, laid down 2 May 1942, launched 22 July 1943, and completed 1 March 1944.
- Urchin, built by Vickers-Armstrongs, Barrow, laid down 28 March 1942, launched 8 March 1943, and completed 24 September 1943.
- Urania, built by Vickers-Armstrongs, laid down 18 June 1942, launched 19 May 1943, and completed 18 January 1944.

== V class ==
- Venus, built by Fairfields of Glasgow, laid down 12 January 1942, launched 22 February 1943, and completed 28 August 1943.
- Verulam, built by Fairfields, laid down 26 January 1942, launched 22 April 1943, and completed 10 December 1943.
- Vigilant, built by Swan Hunter, laid down 31 January 1942, launched 22 December 1942, and completed 10 September 1943.
- Virago, built by Swan Hunter, laid down 16 February 1942, launched 4 February 1943, and completed 5 November 1943.
- Hardy, flotilla leader, built by John Brown & Company, Clydebank, laid down on 14 May 1942, launched 18 March 1943, and completed 14 August 1943. She was lost on 30 January 1944.
- Valentine, built by John Brown, laid down 8 October 1942, launched 2 September 1943, and completed 28 February 1944. She was transferred to Canada as HMCS Algonquin.
- Vixen, built by J. Samuel White, Cowes, laid down 31 October 1942, launched 14 September 1943, and completed 5 March 1944. She was transferred to Canada as HMCS Sioux.
- Volage, built by J. Samuel White, laid down 31 December 1942, launched 15 December 1943, and completed 26 May 1944.

== See also ==
- Type 15 frigate a post-war reconstruction of many ships into fast, first-rate anti-submarine frigates
