= War Emergency Programme destroyers =

1914 class of British destroyers

The War Emergency Programme destroyers were destroyers built for the British Royal Navy during World War I and World War II.

== World War I emergency programmes ==
The 323 destroyers ordered during the First World War belonged to several different classes and were the subject of 14 separate War Programmes between 1914 and 1918. 40 of these were cancelled at the end of the war. The total excludes destroyers building in UK for other navies which were purchased for the Royal Navy following the outbreak of war.

Programme	Date ordered	Design	No of ships	Notes
1st War Programme	10 September 1914	Admiralty M-class design	16	Six more had been built under pre-war 1913-14 Programme
1st War Programme	September 1914.	Yarrow M-class design	4	Three more had been built under pre-war 1913-14 Programme
2nd War Programme	early November 1914	Admiralty M-class design	9	
2nd War Programme		Yarrow M-class design	1	Nerissa
2nd War Programme		Admiralty L-class design	2	Lochinvar and Lassoo
3rd War Programme	late November 1914	Admiralty M-class design	22	
4th War Programme	February 1915	Admiralty M-class design	16	including 8 of "Repeat M-class" with raking stems
4th War Programme		Thornycroft M-class design	2	2 others had been built under pre-war 1913-14 Programme
5th War Programme	May 1915	Admiralty M-class design	16	
5th War Programme		Thornycroft M-class design	2	Rapid and Ready
5th War Programme		Yarrow M-class design	2	Relentless and Rival
5th War Programme		Admiralty R-class design	2	Radstock and Raider
6th War Programme	July 1915	Admiralty R-class design	17	
6th War Programme		Thornycroft R-class design	3	Rosalind, Radiant and Retriever
6th War Programme		Yarrow R-class design	4	Sabrina, Strongbow, Surprise and Sybille
7th War Programme	December 1915	Admiralty R-class design	8	
7th War Programme		Thornycroft R-class design	2	Taurus and Teazer
8th War Programme	5 March 1916	Admiralty R-class design	12	
8th War Programme		Yarrow R-class design	3	Truculent, Tyrant and Ulleswater
8th War Programme		Admiralty Modified R-class design	11	last 5 actually ordered on 19 April 1916
9th War Programme	July 1916	23 Admiralty V-class design	23	Vortigern and Vectis were ordered in August 1916
9th War Programme	August 1916	Thornycroft V-class design	2	Viceroy and Viscount
10th War Programme	9 December 1916	Admiralty W-class design	19	
10th War Programme		Thornycroft W-class design	2	Wolsey and Woolston
11th War Programme	9 April 1917	Admiralty S-class design	24	
11th War Programme		Thornycroft S-class design	2	Speedy and Tobago
11th War Programme		Yarrow S-class design	7	
12th War Programme	June 1917	Admiralty S-class design	33	2 of which were cancelled in 1919
12th War Programme		Thornycroft S-class design	3	Torbay, Toreador and Tourmaline
13th War Programme	January 1918	Admiralty Modified W-class design	14	7 of which were cancelled in 1919
13th War Programme		Thornycroft Modified W-class design	2	Wishart and Witch
14th War Programme	April 1918	Admiralty Modified W-class design	38	31 of which were cancelled in late 1918 or 1919)

== World War II emergency programme ==
The 112 destroyers built during the Second World War were based on the hull and machinery of the earlier J-, K- and N-class destroyers of the 1930s. Each of the fourteen flotillas produced consisted of eight destroyers. Due to supply problems and the persistent failure by the Royal Navy to develop a suitable dual-purpose weapon for destroyers, they were fitted with whatever armament was available. Advances in radar and weaponry were incorporated as they came available. As a result, they were a relatively heterogeneous class incorporating many wartime advances, but ultimately based on a hull that was too small and with an armament too light to be true first-rate vessels equivalent of their contemporaries. As such they are often described as "utility" destroyers. It was not until the Battle-class destroyer of 1944 that the Royal Navy returned to building larger destroyers. Many vessels were transferred to friendly navies.

Class	Flotilla	Date ordered
O class	1st Emergency Flotilla	3 September 1939
P class	2nd Emergency Flotilla	2 October 1939
Q class	3rd Emergency Flotilla	end March 1940
R class	4th Emergency Flotilla	early April 1940
S class	5th Emergency Flotilla	9 January 1941
T class	6th Emergency Flotilla	March 1941
U class	7th Emergency Flotilla	12 June 1941
V class	8th Emergency Flotilla	1 September 1941
W class	9th Emergency Flotilla	3 December 1941
Z class	10th Emergency Flotilla	12 February 1942
Ca- class	11th Emergency Flotilla	16 February 1942
Ch- class	12th Emergency Flotilla	24 July 1942
Co- class	13th Emergency Flotilla	24 July 1942
Cr- class	14th Emergency Flotilla	12 September 1942

The 15th Emergency Flotilla, which would have had ships with names starting with Ce, was cancelled in favour of building the Weapon-class destroyers. The two ships being built, Centaur and Celt, became Tomahawk and Sword.

=== Design changes ===
- The P, and 3 ships of the O, flotilla were fitted with 4-inch guns with a new design of tall gunshield. As a result, they carried only the Rangefinder-Director Mark II(W) for fire control.
- From the Q and R class onwards a transom stern was incorporated.
- From the S and T class onwards the bow was revised to a design based on that of the Tribal-class destroyer, to improve sea-keeping.
- From the Q and R class the main gun calibre returned to 4.7 inches.
- From the R flotilla onwards the officer's accommodation was forwards, instead of aft as was traditional Royal Navy practice
- The S flotilla altered the position of the searchlight between the torpedo tubes with the medium anti-aircraft position abaft the funnel. This more logical arrangement gave the anti-aircraft gun improved arcs of fire in the forward field.
- The S class introduced the new mounting CP Mark XXII for the 4.7-inch guns. This could readily be distinguished from the older mounting CP Mark XVIII of the O, Q and R by its sharply raked face, allowing increased elevation.
- S-class Savage incorporated the new 4.5-inch gun Mark III, in a prototype twin dual-purpose turret BD Mark IV forward and 4.5-inch gun Mark IV in single mountings CP Mark V aft. The former would be introduced in the Battle-class destroyer.
- The T flotilla introduced the lattice foremast, to support the ever-increasing weight of masthead electronics.
- The W flotilla introduced the dual-purpose Director Mark III(W), replacing the low-angle Destroyer DCT and High-Angle Rangefinder-Director Mark II(W) in use since the Q and R class.
- The Z flotilla introduced the new dual-purpose Director Mark I Type K and the 4.5-inch gun in single mountings CP Mark V as trialled in Savage. These mountings were based on the CP Mark XXII used in the later 4.7-inch gunned ships; there was no obvious difference.
- The Ch- flotilla introduced the dual-purpose Director Mark VI with full remote-power control (RPC) for gunlaying. One set of torpedo tubes was removed to counter the increased topweight.
- All ships used the Fuze Keeping Clock High Angle Fire Control Computer.

== See also ==
- Type 15 frigate: postwar full conversion of Wartime Emergency Programme destroyers into first-rate fast anti-submarine frigates
- Type 16 frigate: postwar partial conversion of Wartime Emergency Programme destroyers into second-rate fast anti-submarine frigates

== Bibliography ==
- Colledge, J. J.; Warlow, Ben (2006) [1969]. Ships of the Royal Navy: The Complete Record of All Fighting Ships of the Royal Navy from the 15th Century to the Present (3rd Rev ed.). London: Chatham Publishing. ISBN 978-1-86176-281-8. OCLC 67375475.
- Cocker, Maurice (1983). Destroyers of the Royal Navy, 1893-1981. London, UK: Ian Allan. ISBN 0-7110-1075-7.
- Dittmar, F.J. & Colledge, J.J. (1972). British Warships 1914–1919. Shepperton, UK: Ian Allan. ISBN 0-7110-0380-7.
- Friedman, Norman (2009). British Destroyers: From Earliest Days to the Second World War. Barnsley, UK: Seaforth Publishing. ISBN 978-1-84832-049-9.
- Gardiner, Robert & Gray, Randal (1985). Conway's All The World's Fighting Ships 1906–1921. London: Conway Maritime Press. ISBN 0-85177-245-5.
- March, Edgar J. (1966). British Destroyers. London, UK: Seeley Service & Co.
- Raven, Alan; Roberts, John (1978). War Built Destroyers O to Z Classes. London: Bivouac Books. ISBN 0-85680-010-4.
- Whitley, M. J. (1988). Destroyers of World War 2. Annapolis, Maryland: Naval Institute Press. ISBN 0-87021-326-1.
