= British Pacific Fleet =

Second World War fleet of the Royal Navy

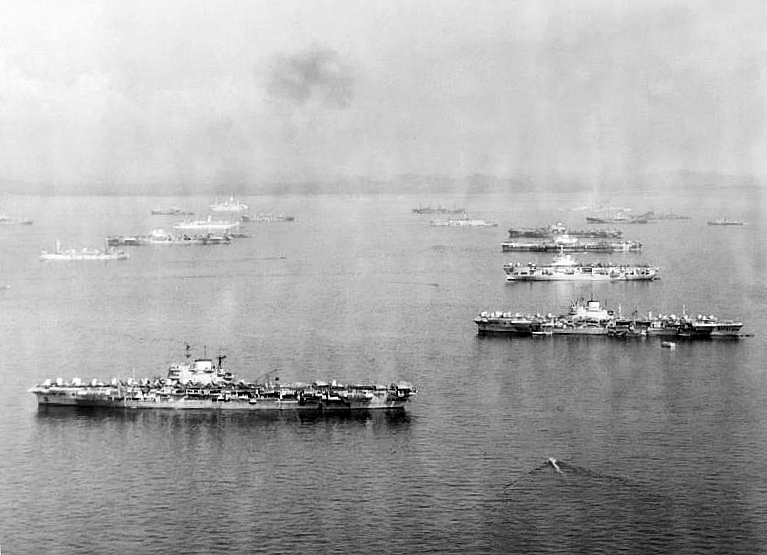
- Five of the six fleet aircraft carriers of the British Pacific Fleet c. 1945
- Active: 1944–45
- Country: United Kingdom
- Branch: Royal Navy also: Royal Australian Navy; Royal Canadian Navy; Royal New Zealand Navy
- Type: Fleet
- Engagements: Operation Meridian; Battle of Okinawa; Naval bombardments of Japan

Commanders
- Notable commanders: Bruce Fraser

The British Pacific Fleet (BPF) was a Royal Navy formation that saw action against Japan during the later part of the Second World War. It was formed from aircraft carriers, other surface warships, submarines and supply vessels of the RN and British Commonwealth navies in November 1944.

After formation in Ceylon, the BPF began with operations against Japanese resources in Sumatra before moving to Australia where it made its headquarters at Sydney with a forward base at Manus Island off Papua New Guinea. The fleet supported the invasion of Okinawa in March 1945 by neutralising the Sakishima Islands. Though subjected to heavy attacks by Japanese aircraft, their well-armoured carriers and modern fighter aircraft gave effective protection. Submarines attached to the fleet sank Japanese shipping, and in July 1945 the fleet joined in the bombardment of the Japanese home islands. By the time Japan surrendered in August 1945, the fleet included four battleships, six fleet carriers, fifteen smaller carriers and over 750 aircraft.

== Background ==
Following their retreat to the western side of the Indian Ocean in 1942, British naval forces did not return to the South West Pacific theatre until 17 May 1944, when an Allied carrier task force implemented Operation Transom, a joint raid on Surabaya, Java.

The US was retaking British territories in the Pacific and extending its influence. It was therefore seen as a political and military imperative by the British Government to restore a British presence in the region and to deploy British forces against Japan. The British Government was determined that British territories, such as Hong Kong, should be recaptured by British forces.

The British Government was not initially unanimous on the commitment of the BPF. Churchill, in particular, argued against it, not wishing to be a visibly junior partner in what had been exclusively the United States' battle. He also considered that a British presence would be unwelcome and should be concentrated on Burma and Malaya. Naval planners, supported by the Chiefs of Staff, believed that such a commitment would strengthen British influence and the British Chiefs of Staff considered mass resignation, so strongly held were their opinions.

The Admiralty had proposed a British role in the Pacific in early 1944 but the initial USN response had been discouraging. Admiral Ernest King, Commander-in-Chief United States Fleet and Chief of Naval Operations, was reluctant to concede any such role and raised a number of objections, and insisted that the BPF should be self-sufficient. These were eventually overcome or discounted and at a meeting, US President Franklin D. Roosevelt "intervened to say that the British Fleet was no sooner offered than accepted. In this, though the fact was not mentioned, he overruled Admiral King's opinion."

The Australian Government had sought US military assistance in 1942, when it was faced with the possibility of Japanese invasion. While Australia had made a significant contribution to the Pacific War, it had never been an equal partner with its US counterparts in strategy. It was argued that a British presence would act as a counterbalance to the powerful and increasing US presence in the Pacific.

== Fleet ==
=== Constituent forces ===
The fleet was founded when Admiral Sir Bruce Fraser struck his flag at Trincomalee as Commander-in-Chief of the British Eastern Fleet and hoisted it in the gunboat Tarantula, a worn out ship in use as offices, as Commander-in-Chief British Pacific Fleet. He later transferred his flag to a more suitable vessel, the battleship Howe.

The Eastern Fleet was based in Ceylon (now Sri Lanka), and reorganised into the British East Indies Fleet, subsequently becoming the British Pacific Fleet (BPF). The BPF operated against targets in Sumatra, (operations Robson and Meridian) gaining experience until early 1945, when it departed Trincomalee for Sydney.

The Royal Navy provided the majority of the fleet's vessels and all the capital ships but elements and personnel included contributions from the Royal Fleet Auxiliary (RFA), as well as the Commonwealth nations, including the Royal Australian Navy (RAN), Royal Canadian Navy (RCN) and Royal New Zealand Navy (RNZN). With its larger vessels integrated with United States Navy (USN) formations since 1942, the RAN's contribution was limited. A high proportion of naval aviators were New Zealanders and Canadians. The USN also contributed to the BPF, as did personnel from the South African Navy (SAN). Port facilities in Australia and New Zealand also made vital contributions in support of the British Pacific Fleet.

During World War II, the fleet was commanded by Admiral Sir Bruce Fraser. In practice, command of the fleet in action devolved to Vice-Admiral Sir Bernard Rawlings, with Vice-Admiral Sir Philip Vian in charge of air operations by the Royal Navy's Fleet Air Arm (FAA). The fighting end of the fleet was referred to as Task Force 37 from 28 May 1945 (previously 57) and the Fleet Train was Task Force 113. The 1st Aircraft Carrier Squadron was the lead carrier formation.

No. 300 Wing RAF was established in Australia in late 1944 to fly transport aircraft in support of the BPF, and came under the direct command of Fraser. The wing was expanded to a group in 1945 and conducted regular flights from Sydney to the fleet's forward bases.

The aviation squadrons were formed into air groups from June 1945 for administering each carrier's embarked squadrons.

=== Supply ===
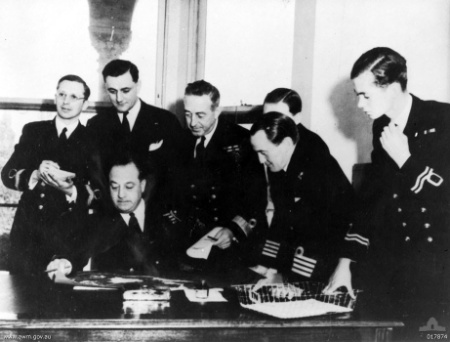
Melbourne, 13 December 1944. First conference of the staff of Admiral Sir Bruce Fraser's new British Pacific Fleet, held in Melbourne. Left to right: Lieutenant Commander G. P. Vollmer (Secretary to Chief of Staff); Lieutenant Commander R. N. Heard; Vice-Admiral C. S. Daniel (seated) Vice Admiral (Administration); Commodore W. G. Andrews; Captain E. H. Shattock (concealed); Captain R. C. Duckworth; Lieutenant S. G. Warrender.

The requirement that the BPF be self-sufficient meant the establishment of a fleet train that could support a naval force at sea for weeks or months. The Royal Navy had been accustomed to operating close to its bases in Britain, the Mediterranean and the Indian Ocean. Infrastructure and expertise were lacking in the Pacific rim. In the north Atlantic and Mediterranean, the high risk of submarine and air attack precluded routine refuelling at sea. Fortunately for the BPF "the American logistics authorities... interpreted self-sufficiency in a very liberal sense." American officers told Rear Admiral Douglas Fisher, commander of the British Fleet Train, that he could have anything and everything "that could be given without Admiral King's knowledge."

The Admiralty sent Vice Admiral Charles Daniel to the United States for consultation about the supply and administration of the fleet. He then proceeded to Australia where he became Vice Admiral, Administration, British Pacific Fleet, a role that "if unspectacular compared with command of a fighting squadron, was certainly one of the most arduous to be allocated to a British Flag officer during the entire war." The US Pacific Fleet had assembled an enormous fleet of oilers and supply ships of every type. Even before the war, it had been active in the development of underway replenishment techniques.

In February 1944 the Admiralty estimated that the Fleet Train would require 134 merchant ships, of about 1½ million gross tons. As only 20 ships could be provided "in due course" the remainder would have to come from the United States, the Admiralty's resources (although only a "handful" of its 560 merchant ships were actually available), or the general pool of merchant shipping (on which there were "many demands"). And the Admiralty requirements increased from 80 ships (totalling 590,000 tons) in January to 134 then by the end of March to 158. The Prime Minister had been alarmed for the original requirements for 80 ships, and on 9 April he issued a minute defining the limits of the Fleet Train based on a minimum of 24 million tons of imports "this year". He referred to the Navy getting 230,000 tons of new merchant shipping in about a year. The minute referred to operations "in the Indian ocean or in the South-West Pacific", reflecting his own preference for Operation Culverin against northern Sumatra and Malaya rather than the "Middle Strategy".

The Admiralty realised that it needed a great deal of new equipment and training, in a short time and with whatever it had to hand. Lacking specialist ships, it had to improvise a fleet train from RN, RFA and merchant ships. On 8 February 1944, the First Sea Lord, Admiral of the Fleet Sir Andrew Cunningham, informed the Defence Committee that 91 ships would be required to support the BPF. This was based on an assumption that the BPF would be active off the Philippines or would have a base there. By March, the war zone had moved north and the Americans were unwilling to allow the British to establish facilities in the Philippines. The estimate had grown to 158 ships, as it was recognised that operations eventually would be fought close to Japan. This had to be balanced against the shipping needed to import food for the population of the UK. In January 1945, the War cabinet was forced to postpone the deployment of the fleet by two months due to the shortage of shipping.

The BPF found that its tankers were too few, too slow and in some cases unsuitable for the task of replenishment at sea. Its oiling gear, hoses and fittings were too often poorly designed. British ships refuelled at sea mostly by the over-the-stern method, a safer but less efficient technique compared with the American method of refuelling in parallel. Lack of proper equipment and insufficient practice meant burst hoses or excessive time at risk to submarine attack, while holding a constant course during fuelling. As the Royal Australian Navy had discovered, British-built ships had only about a third of the refrigeration space of a comparable American ship. They also suffered from limited fuel tankage and less efficient machinery, particularly the capital ships (A comparison of HMS King George V and USS Washington conducted in 1942 found the British ship burned 39 per cent more fuel at cruising speed and 20 per cent at high speed, giving her half the action radius.) British ships therefore required replenishment more frequently than American ships. In some cases even American-built equipment was not interchangeable, for FAA aircraft had been "Anglicized" by the installation of British radios and oxygen masks, while Vought Corsairs had their wing-folding arrangements modified to fit into the more cramped hangars of British carriers. Replacement aircraft therefore had to be brought from the UK.

The British Chiefs of Staff decided early on to base the BPF in Australia rather than India. While it was apparent that Australia, with its population of only about seven million could not support the projected 675,000 men and women of the BPF, the actual extent of the Australian contribution was undetermined. The Australian government agreed to contribute to the support of the BPF but the Australian economy was fully committed to the war effort and manpower and stores for the BPF could only come from taking them from American and Australian forces fighting the Japanese.

Unfortunately, Admiral Sir Bruce Fraser arrived in Sydney on 10 December 1944 under the mistaken impression that Australia had asked for the BPF and promised to provide for its needs. Two days later, the Acting Prime Minister of Australia Frank Forde announced the allocation of £21,156,500 for the maintenance of the BPF. In January 1945, General of the Army Douglas MacArthur agreed to release American stockpiles in Australia to support the BPF. The Australian government soon became concerned at the voracious demands of the BPF works programme, which was criticised by Australian military leaders. In April 1945, Fraser publicly criticised the Australian government's handling of waterside industrial disputes that were holding up British ships. The government was shocked and angered but agreed to allocate £6,562,500 for BPF naval works. Fraser was not satisfied. On 8 August 1945, Prime Minister of the United Kingdom Clement Attlee felt obliged to express his regret for the misunderstandings to the Australian government.

After bombarding the Sumatra oil refineries for Nimitz, the Fleet arrived in Australia on 4 February 1945; it comprised two battleships, four fleet carriers, three cruisers and accompanying destroyers. The Fleet Train comprised over 300,000 tons of shipping as built or converted since the beginning of 1944. In June 1945 the Fleet was to comprise four battleships, ten aircraft carriers, sixteen cruisers (including two from New Zealand and one from Canada), forty destroyers and about ninety escorts (including Canadian escorts).

The distance from Sydney was too far to allow efficient fleet support so with much American support, a forward base was established at Seeadler Harbor, Manus atoll, in the Admiralty Islands, which was described as "Scapa Flow with bloody palm trees". As well as its base at Sydney, the Fleet Air Arm established Mobile Naval Air Bases (MONABs) in Australia to provide supplies and technical support for the aircraft. The first of these became active in Sydney in January 1945.

== Operations ==
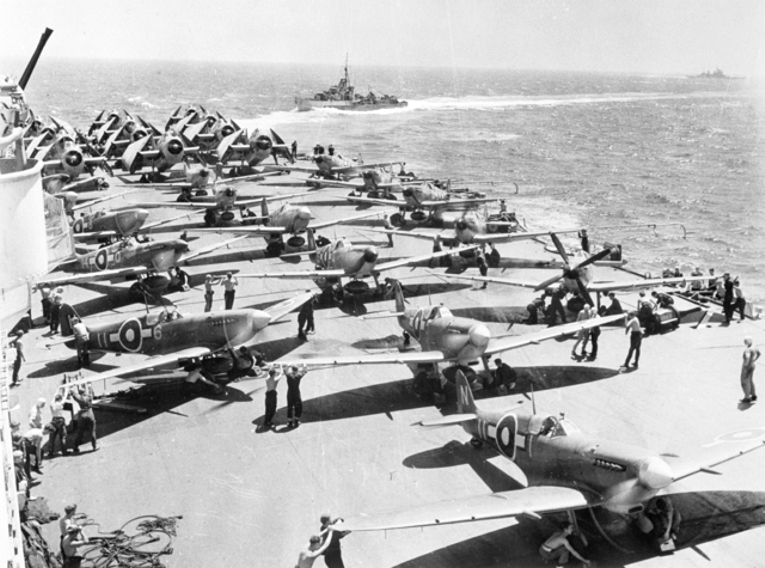
Fleet Air Arm Grumman Avengers and Supermarine Seafires on the deck of Implacable warm up their engines before taking off. Other British warships in the background.

Major actions in which the fleet was involved included Operation Meridian, air strikes in January 1945 against oil production at Palembang, Sumatra. These raids, conducted in bad weather, succeeded in reducing the oil supply of the Japanese Navy. A total of 48 FAA aircraft were lost due to enemy action and crash landings against claims of 30 Japanese aeroplanes destroyed in dogfights and 38 on the ground.

The United States Navy (USN), which had control of Allied operations in the Pacific Ocean Areas, gave the BPF combat units the name Task Force 57 (TF-57) when it joined Admiral Raymond Spruance's United States Fifth Fleet on 15 March 1945. On 27 May 1945, it became Task Force 37 (TF-37) when it became part of Admiral William Halsey's United States Third Fleet.

In March 1945, while supporting the invasion of Okinawa, the BPF had sole responsibility for operations in the Sakishima Islands. Its role was to suppress Japanese air activity, using gunfire and air attack, at potential kamikaze staging airfields that would otherwise be a threat to US Navy vessels operating at Okinawa. The British fleet carriers with their armoured flight decks were subject to heavy and repeated kamikaze attacks, but they proved highly resistant, and returned to action relatively quickly. The USN liaison officer on Indefatigable commented: "When a kamikaze hits a US carrier it means 6 months of repair at Pearl [Harbor]. When a kamikaze hits a Limey carrier it's just a case of 'Sweepers, man your brooms'."

Fleet Air Arm Supermarine Seafires saw service in the Pacific campaigns. Due to their good high altitude performance, short range and lack of ordnance-carrying capabilities (compared to the Hellcats and Corsairs of the Fleet) the Seafires were allocated the defensive duties of combat air patrol (CAP) over the fleet. Seafires were vital in countering the kamikaze attacks during the Iwo Jima landings and beyond. The Seafires' best day was 15 August 1945, shooting down eight attacking aircraft for one loss.

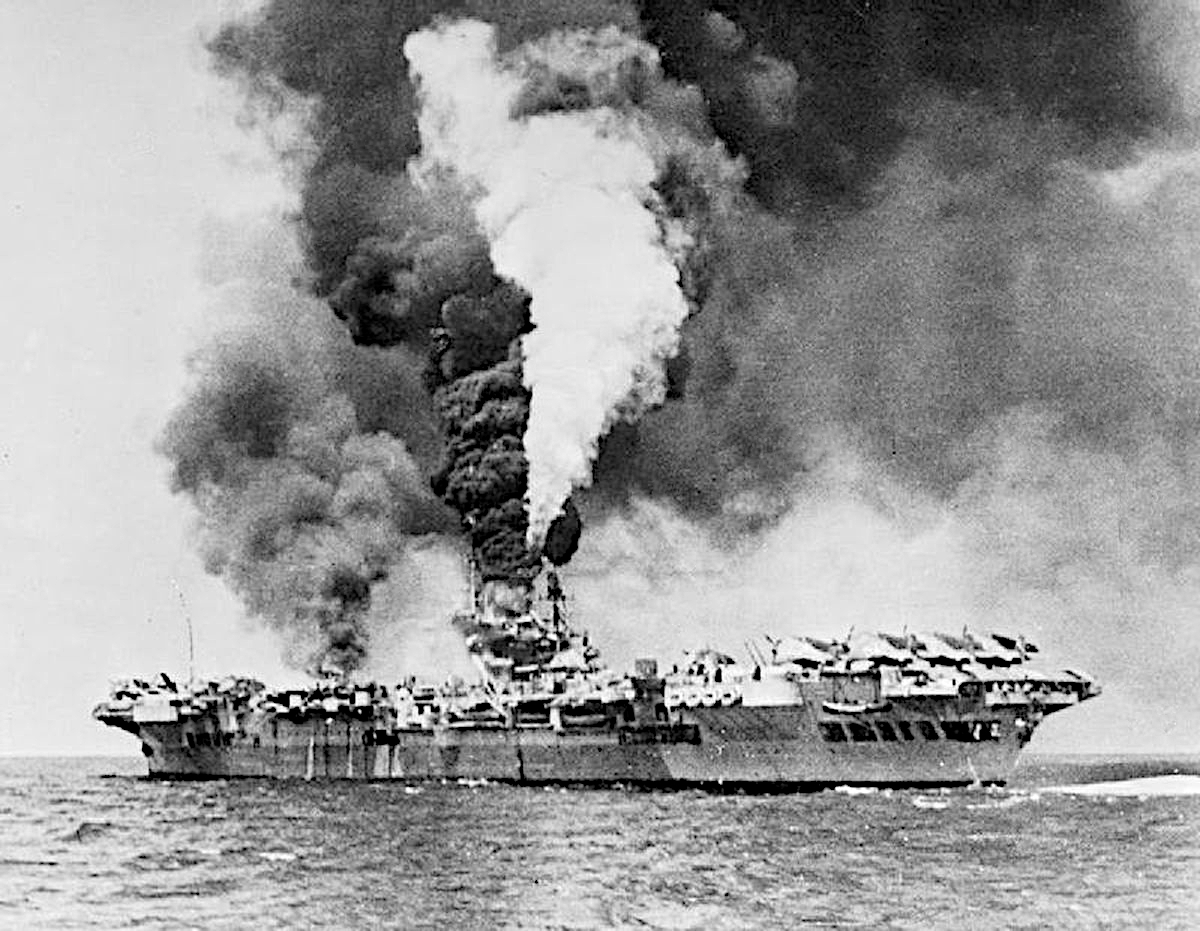
Formidable on fire after a kamikaze hit.

In April 1945, the British 4th Submarine Flotilla was transferred to the big Allied submarine base at Fremantle, Western Australia, as part of the BPF. Its most notable success in this period was the sinking of the heavy cruiser Ashigara, on 8 June 1945 in Banka Strait, off Sumatra, by the submarines Trenchant and Stygian. On 31 July 1945, in Operation Struggle, the British midget submarine XE3, crewed by Lieutenant Ian Fraser, Acting Leading Seaman James Magennis, Sub-Lieutenant William James Lanyon Smith, RNZNVR and Engine Room Artificer Third Class, Charles Alfred Reed, attacked Japanese shipping at Singapore. They seriously damaged the heavy cruiser Takao, while docked at her berth at Selatar Naval Base. Fraser and Magennis were awarded the Victoria Cross, Smith received the Distinguished Service Order (DSO) and Reed the Conspicuous Gallantry Medal (CGM).

Battleships and aircraft from the fleet also participated in the Allied naval bombardments on Japanese home islands. For the assaults on Japan, the British commanders accepted the BPF should become a component element of the US 3rd Fleet, commanded by Admiral William Halsey. Battleship King George V bombarded Hitachi, about 80 mi (130 km) northeast of Tokyo, and Hamamatsu, near Toyohashi. This was the last time a British battleship fired in action; the US fleet commander, William Halsey, excluded British forces from the bombing of Kure naval base. Halsey wrote in his memoirs: "it was imperative that we forestall a possible postwar claim by Britain that she had delivered even a part of the final blow that demolished the Japanese fleet.... an exclusively American attack was therefore in American interests". Carrier strikes by British naval aircraft were carried out against land and harbour targets during the attacks on Kure and the Inland Sea, 24–28 July 1945. Naval aircraft attacked the port of Osaka, airfields, and, notably, sank Japanese escort carrier Shimane Maru and disabled the Kaiyō. Two escort ships and several smaller vessels were also sunk.

The BPF would have played a major part in a proposed invasion of the Japanese home islands, known as Operation Downfall, which was cancelled after Japan surrendered. The last naval air action in World War II was on VJ-Day when British carrier aircraft shot down Japanese Zero fighters.

By August 1948, the Fleet had shrunk to comprise cruisers London, HMS Sussex; destroyers HMS Cossack, HMS Comus; Concord, Consort, HMS Constance; frigates HMS Alacrity, Ametheyst, HMS Hart and HMS Black Swan; submarines HMS Aeneas, HMS Affray, HMS Auriga; despatch vessel HMS Alert; fleet tug HMS Encore; RFA salvage vessels RFA King Salvor (A291), RFA Prince Salvor (A292); survey ship HMS Dampier; controlled minesweeper Dabchick and seven minesweepers, including Michael and Flying Fish.

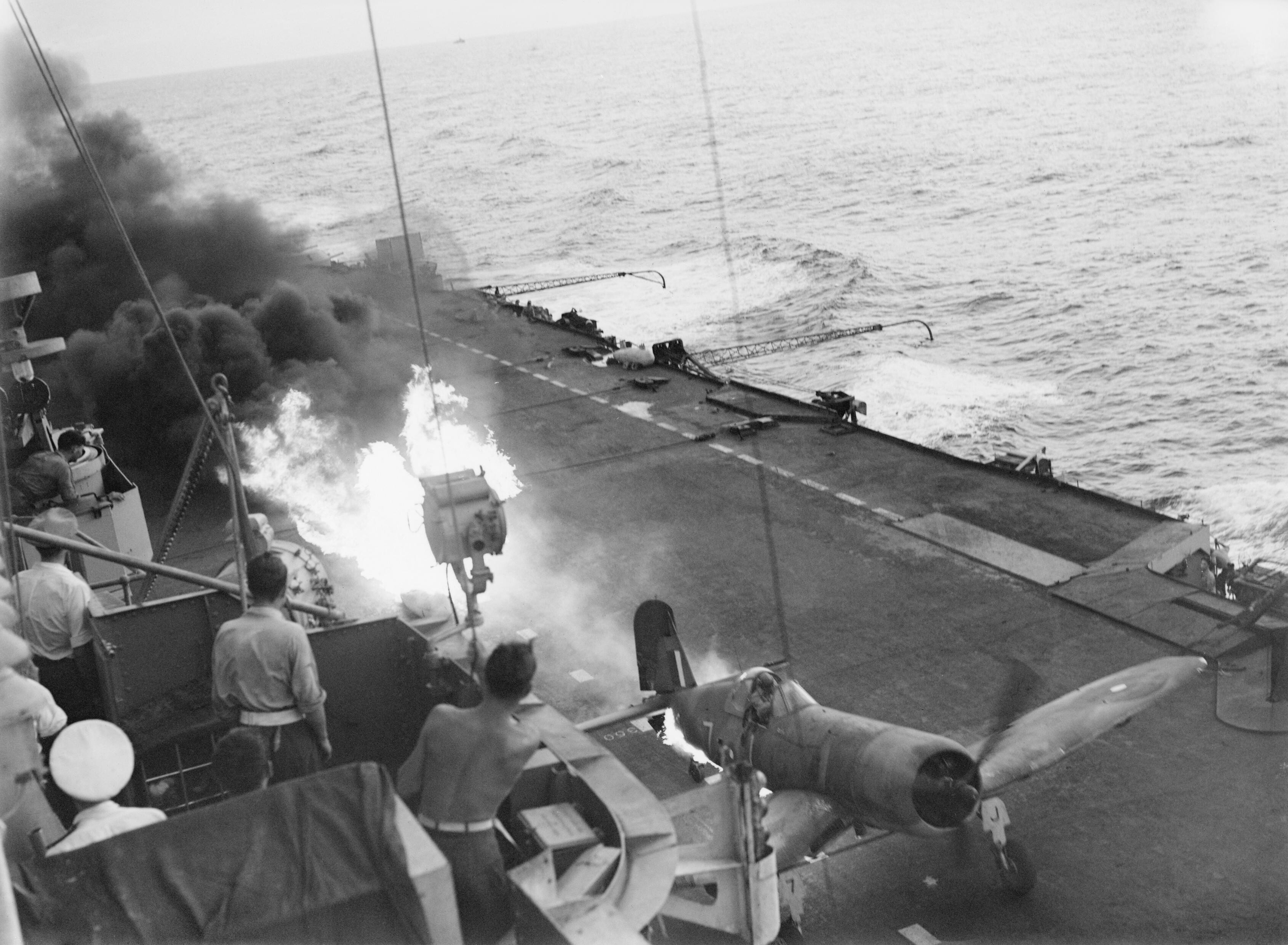
An FAA Corsair's auxiliary petrol tank bursts into flames, while making an emergency landing on board HMS Victorious.

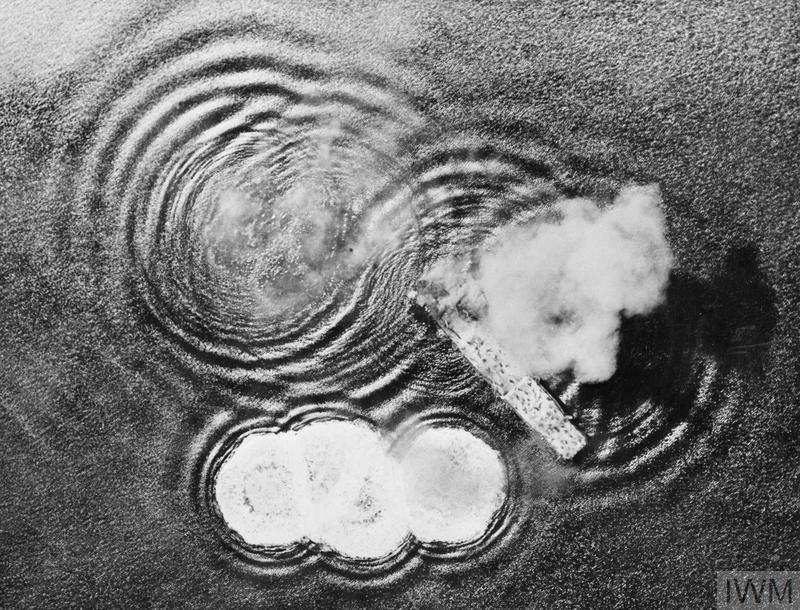
Japanese Escort Carrier, Shimane Maru, under attack by Avenger aircraft operating from HMS Victorious, 24 July 1945.

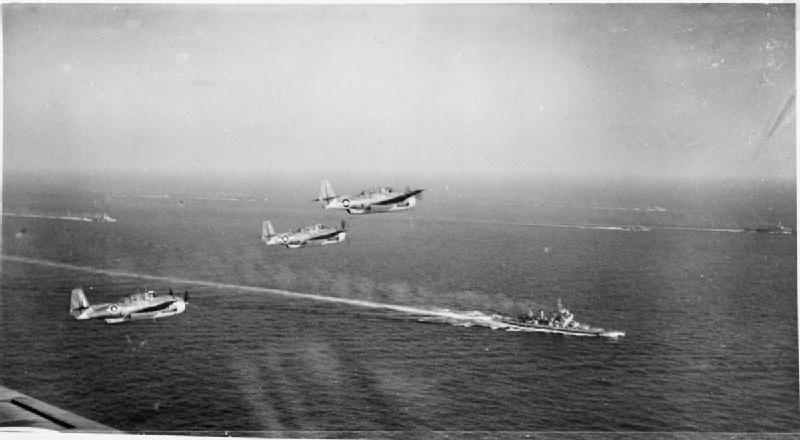
Grumman Avengers on the way to attack Sakishima targets in support of the American landing on Okinawa.

== Order of battle ==
=== Ships ===
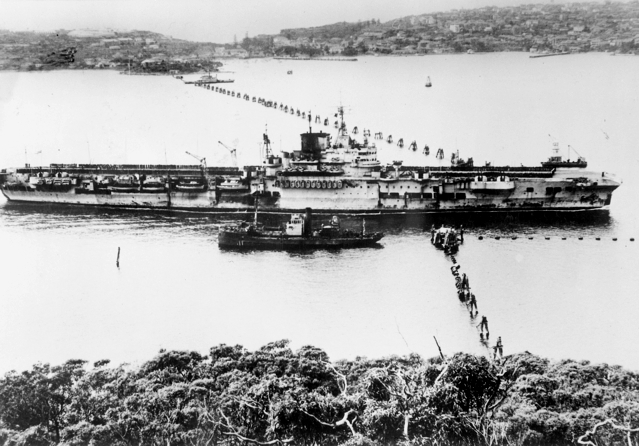
Formidable passing through the Sydney Harbour anti-submarine boom net in 1945. The blackened funnel was the result of the kamikaze attack pictured above, in which a Japanese aircraft crashed on the flight deck.

The fleet included six fleet carriers, four light carriers, two aircraft maintenance carriers and nine escort carriers (with a total of more than 750 aircraft), five battleships, 11 cruisers, 35 destroyers, 14 frigates, 44 smaller warships, 31 submarines, and 54 large vessels in the fleet train.

Fleet carriers

- Formidable: approximate air group 36 Corsairs, 15 Avengers (Flagship 1st Aircraft Carrier Squadron)
- Illustrious: approximate air group 36 Corsairs, 15 Avengers
- Victorious: 36 Corsairs, 15 Avengers, plus Supermarine Walrus amphibians
- Indomitable: 39 Hellcats, 21 Avengers
- Implacable: 48 Seafires, 21 Avengers, 12 Fairey Fireflies
- Indefatigable: 40 Seafires, 18 Avengers, 12 Fireflies

Light carriers

- Colossus: 24 Corsairs, 18 Fairey Barracudas
- Glory: 21 Corsairs, 18 Barracudas
- Venerable: 21 Corsairs, 18 Barracudas
- Vengeance: 24 Corsairs, 18 Barracudas

Maintenance carriers

- Pioneer
- Unicorn

Escort carriers

- Striker (flag ship 30th Aircraft Carrier Squadron)
- Arbiter
- Chaser
- Fencer
- Ruler
- Reaper
- Slinger
- Speaker
- Vindex

Battleships

- Howe (Flagship 1st Battle Squadron)
- King George V
- Duke of York arrived in July 1945
- Anson arrived in July 1945
- Nelson arrived in July 1945

Cruisers

- HMNZS Achilles
- Argonaut
- Belfast
- Bermuda
- Black Prince
- Ceylon
- Euryalus
- HMNZS Gambia
- Newfoundland
- Newcastle
- HMCS Ontario
- Swiftsure (Flagship 4th Cruiser Squadron)
- HMCS Uganda

Cruiser-minelayers

- Apollo
- Ariadne
- Manxman

Auxiliary anti-aircraft cruiser

- HMCS Prince Robert

Destroyers

- HMCS Algonquin
- Barfleur
- Grenville (U-class flotilla leader)
- Kempenfelt (W-class flotilla leader)
- HMAS Napier
- HMAS Nepal
- HMAS Nizam
- HMAS Norman
- Quadrant
- Quality
- HMAS Queenborough
- HMAS Quiberon
- HMAS Quickmatch
- Teazer
- Tenacious
- Termagant
- Terpsichore
- Troubridge
- Tumult
- Tuscan
- Tyrian
- Ulster
- Ulysses
- Undaunted
- Undine
- Urania
- Urchin
- Ursa
- Wager
- Wakeful
- Wessex
- Whelp
- Whirlwind
- Wizard
- Wrangler

Frigates

- Aire
- Avon
- Barle
- Bigbury Bay
- Derg
- Findhorn
- Helford
- Odzani
- Parret
- Plym
- Usk
- Veryan Bay
- Whitesand Bay
- Widemouth Bay

Sloops

- Alacrity
- Amethyst
- Black Swan
- Crane
- Cygnet
- Enchantress
- Erne
- Flamingo
- Hart
- Hind
- Opossum
- Pheasant
- Redpole
- Starling
- Stork
- Whimbrel
- Woodcock
- Wren

Corvettes

- HMNZS Arbutus
- HMAS Ballarat
- HMAS Bendigo
- HMAS Burnie
- HMAS Cairns
- HMAS Cessnock
- HMAS Gawler
- HMAS Geraldton
- HMAS Goulburn
- HMAS Ipswich
- HMAS Kalgoorlie
- HMAS Launceston
- HMAS Lismore
- HMAS Maryborough
- HMAS Pirie
- HMAS Tamworth
- HMAS Toowoomba
- HMAS Whyalla
- HMAS Wollongong

Submarines

- Porpoise Minelayer
- Rorqual Minelayer
- Sanguine
- Scotsman
- Sea Devil
- Sea Nymph
- Sea Scout
- Selene
- Sidon
- Sleuth
- Solent
- Spark
- Spearhead
- Stubborn
- Stygian
- Supreme
- Taciturn
- Tapir
- Taurus
- Telemachus
- Thorough
- Thule
- Tiptoe
- Totem
- Torbay
- Trenchant
- Trump
- Tudor
- Turpin
- Virtue Antisubmarine training
- Voracious Antisubmarine training
- Vox Antisubmarine training

Landing ships

- Glenearn – landing ship, infantry (Large)
- Lothian – landing ship, headquarters ship (Large)

Fleet train

- Adamant submarine depot ship
- Aorangi accommodation ship
- Artifex repair ship
- Assistance repair ship
- RFA Bacchus Distilling ship
- Bonaventure Submarine depot ship
- Berry Head Repair ship
- Deer Sound Repair ship
- Diligence Repair ship
- Dullisk Cove Repair ship
- SS Empire Clyde Hospital ship
- SS Empire Crest Water carrier
- Fernmore Boom carrier
- Flamborough Head Repair ship
- Fort Colville Aircraft store ship
- RFA Fort Langley Aircraft store ship
- HMHS Gerusalemme Hospital ship
- Guardian Netlayer
- HMNZS Kelantan Repair ship
- RFA King Salvor Salvage ship
- Lancashire Accommodation ship
- Leonian Boom carrier
- Maidstone Submarine depot ship
- NZHS Maunganui Hospital ship
- HMS Menestheus Recreation ship
- Montclare Destroyer Depot Ship
- HMHS Oxfordshire Hospital ship
- Resource Repair ship
- RFA Salvestor Salvage ship
- RFA Salvictor Salvage ship
- Shillay Danlayer
- Springdale Repair ship
- Stagpool Distilling ship
- RNH Tjitalengka Hospital ship
- Trodday Danlayer
- Tyne Destroyer Depot Ship
- Vacport Water carrier
- RNH Vasna Hospital ship

Replenishment oilers

- RFA Arndale
- RFA Bishopdale
- RFA Brown Ranger
- RFA Cederdale
- RFA Eaglesdale
- RFA Green Ranger
- RFA Olna
- RFA Rapidol
- RFA Serbol
- RFA Wave Emperor
- RFA Wave Governor
- RFA Wave King
- RFA Wave Monarch
- Aase Maersk
- Carelia
- Darst Creek
- Golden Meadow
- Iere
- Loma Nova
- San Adolpho
- San Amado
- San Ambrosia
- Seven Sisters

Store ships

- Bosporus
- City of Dieppe
- Corinda
- Darvel
- Edna
- Fort Alabama
- Fort Constantine Victualling stores ship
- Fort Dunvegan Victualling stores ship
- Fort Edmonton Victualling stores ship
- Fort Providence Naval stores ship
- Fort Wrangell Naval stores ship
- Gudrun Maersk
- Hermelin
- Heron
- Hickory Burn
- Hickory Dale
- Hickory Glen
- Hickory Steam
- Jaarstrom
- Kheti
- Kistna
- Kola
- Marudu
- Pacheco
- Prince de Liege
- Princess Maria Pia
- Prome
- Robert Maersk
- San Andres
- Sclesvig
- Thyra S

Source: Smith, Task Force 57, pp. 178–184

=== Fleet Air Arm Squadrons ===
FAA squadrons
Sqdn no	Aircraft type	Ship	Dates	Notes
801	Seafire L.III	Implacable	May 1945 onwards	Part of 8th Carrier Air Group. The squadron joined the British Pacific Fleet in May 1945 as part of the 8th Carrier Air Group escorting strikes on Truk and targets around Japan till after VJ day.
812	Barracuda II	Vengeance	July 1945 onwards	At sea on VJ Day en route to Taiwan, as part of Task Group (TG) 111.2, 11th Aircraft Carrier Squadron, diverted to Hong Kong arriving 29 August.
814	Barracuda II	Venerable	June 1945 onwards	15th Carrier Air Group, saw no action
820	Avenger I	Indefatigable	Embarked November 1944 with 849 squadron, and took part	With No 2 Strike Wing for attacks on oil refineries at Palembang, Sumatra and Sakashima Gunto islands; from June 1945 with 7th Carrier Air Group for strikes around Tokyo
827	Barracuda II	Colossus	Embarked for BPF January 1945	Operated in the Indian Ocean from June 1945 until VJ-Day (BPF service unclear)
828	Barracuda I, II & III; Avenger II	Implacable	From June 1945	Part of 8th Carrier Air Group, involved in attacks on Truk and Japan
837	Barracuda II	Glory	Embarked April 1945	Part of 16th Carrier Air Group but saw no action before VJ-Day; covered Japanese surrender at Rabaul
848	Avenger I	Formidable	April 1945 onwards	Participated in strikes against Sakishima Gunto Island airfields and shore targets and on Formosa; in early June 1945 joined the 2nd Carrier Air Group for strikes on Japan in July
849	Avenger I & II	Victorious	December 1944 onwards	Part of No 2 Naval Strike Wing for raids on Pangkalan Brandon and Palembang oil refineries, Sumatra in January 1945; strikes on the Sakashima Gunto islands and Formosa, strikes in July 1945 Japan, near Tokyo, where an 849 aircraft scored the first bomb hit on the carrier Kaiyo
854	Avenger I, II & III	Illustrious	December 1944 onwards	Participated in strikes on Belawan Deli and Palembang; then took part in attacks on the Sakishima Gunto Islands; in July 1945 joined 3rd Carrier Air Group and saw no further action
857	Avenger I & II	Indomitable	November 1944 onwards	Joined in attacks on Belawan Deli, Pangkalan Brandan and Palembang in December 1944 and January 1945; later 2 months continuous attacks on Sakishima Gunto islands and Formosa; no further action before VJ-Day, but subsequently combatted Japanese suicide boats on 31 August and 1 September 1945 near Hong Kong
880	Seafire L.III	Implacable	Embarked March 1945	Escorted attacks on Truk island in June 1945; at end June merged into the new 8th Carrier Air Group; joined attacks in Japan
885	Hellcat I & II	Ruler	Embarked December 1944	Provided fighter cover for the Fleet; aircraft re-equipped June 1945, but saw no more action before VJ-Day
887	Seafire F.III & L.III	Indefatigable	Embarked November 1944	Took part in attack on oil refineries at Palembang, Sumatra in January 1945; strikes on the Sakashima Gunto islands; strikes around Tokyo just before VJ-Day
888	Hellcat	Indefatigable	Until January 1945	Operations over Sumatra, then remained in Ceylon when BPF departed
894	Seafire L.III	Indefatigable	Embarked November 1944	Took part in operations against Palembang oil refineries in Sumatra, January 1945; in March and April 1945 attacked targets in the Sakishima Gunto islands, and then attacked the Japanese mainland just prior to VJ-Day.
899	Seafire L.III	Seafire pool	Embarked Chaser February 1945	Operational Training squadron, was on HMS Arbiter on VJ-Day
1770	Firefly	Indefatigable	Embarked HMS Indefatigable	November 1944 the squadron embarked on HMS Indefatigable for the Far East, where it took part in the attack on the oil refineries at Palembang, Sumatra in January 1945. It subsequently was involved in strikes on the Sakashima Gunto islands, and against Formosa.
1771	Firefly	Implacable	March to September 1945	Re-embarked as part of the 8th Carrier Air Group to take part in the attacks on Truk in June 1945, and subsequently attacks on the Japanese mainland.
1772	Firefly	Indefatigable	July 1945 onwards till V-J Day	Strikes against the Japanese mainland.
1790	Firefly NF	Vindex	From August 1945	Not in operational area before VJ-Day
1830	Corsair	Illustrious	December 1943	Part of 5th Naval Fighter Wing, sailing in January 1944 to Ceylon for the Eastern Fleet. March 1944 sweeps were made over the Bay of Bengal, in April 1944 enemy shore installations were attacked at Sabang, and in May 1944 operation were carried out at Sourabaya.une 1944 was spent attacking the Andaman islands, and in July operations were carried out at Sabang. Then, in August 1944 the ship sailed for Durban to refit, the squadron disembarking at Wingfield where it was stationed till October 1944, having increased to 18 aircraft. In December 1944 and January 1945 the squadron took part in the attacks on Palembang oil refineries in Sumatra, after which the ship joined the British Pacific Fleet. March and April 1945 was spent with operations attacking the Sakishima Gunto islands, but after the ship was damaged by a Japanese Kamikaze it returned with 1830 squadron to the UK. Squadron disbanded July 1945.
1831	Corsair	Glory	June 1945	No Action.
1833	Corsair	Illustrious	March 1944	In March 1944 sweeps were made over the Bay of Bengal, in April 1944 enemy shore installations were attacked at Sabang, and in May 1944 operation were carried out at Sourabaya. June 1944 was spent attacking the Andaman islands, and in July operations were carried out at Sabang. Then, in August 1944 the ship sailed for Durban to refit, the squadron disembarking at Wingfield where it was stationed till October 1944, having increased to 18 aircraft. In December 1944 and January 1945 the squadron took part in the attacks on Palembang oil refineries in Sumatra, after which the ship joined the British Pacific Fleet. March and April 1945 was spent with operations attacking the Sakishima Gunto islands, but after the ship was damaged by a Japanese Kamikaze it returned to the UK with 1833 squadron aircrew without their aircraft and where they disbanded in July 1945.
1834	Corsair	Victorious	August 1944	The squadron took part in a series of attacks on Sumatra, including on the Palembang oil refineries in Sumatra in January 1945. Subsequently, the ship joined the British Pacific Fleet and commenced attacks on the Sakishima Gunto islands between March and May 1945. In June 1945 the squadron joined the 1st Carrier Air Group at Schofields, and embarked on HMS Victorious for a series of attacks on the Japanese mainland in the Tokyo area.
1836	Corsair	Victorious	July 1944 until V-J Day	In July 1944 the squadron attacked oil storage facilities and airfields at Sabang, Sumatra. Operation continued in the area until January 1945 with the attacks on oil installations at Palembang, Sumatra. It subsequently was involved in strikes on the Sakashima Gunto islands, and then joined the 1st Carrier Air Group. The squadron re-embarking on HMS Victorious later in the month for strikes in July 1945 against the Japanese mainland near Tokyo until VJ-Day.
1839	Hellcat	Indomitable	July 1944 to June 1945	In July 1944 the squadron embarked on HMS Indomitable, providing cover during attacks on Sumatra. In December 1944 and January 1945 the squadron took part in the strikes on the Palembang, Sumatran oil refineries, and with the ship joined the British Pacific Fleet to attack the Sakishima Gunto islands. On 24 January 1945 Sub Lt RF Mackie RNZN of 1839 sqdn flying Hellcat JV141 "116/W" shot down a Japanese Ki44 aircraft at Palembang. In April 1945 the squadron absorbed 1840 squadron, and subsequently the 5th Naval Fighter Wing disbanded into the 11th Carrier Air Group in June 1945. In early August the squadron embarked on HMS Indomitable but saw no action before VJ-Day.
1840	Hellcat	Speaker	December 1944	The squadron joined the 3rd Naval Fighter Wing at Eglington, and subsequently in December 1944 embarked on HMS Speaker for the Pacific, where it provided fighter coverage of the British Pacific Fleet train, but was absorbed into 1839 squadrons and disbanded in April 1945.
1841	Corsair	Formidable	December 1944	Embarked on HMS Speaker for the Pacific, where it provided fighter coverage of the British Pacific Fleet train, but was absorbed into 1839 squadrons and disbanded in April 1945.
1842	Corsair	Formidable	September 1944	In March 1945 the squadron re-equipped with Corsair IV. In April and May 1945 the squadron took part in operations against the Sakishimo Gunto islands, and in June the 6th Naval Fighter Wing merged into the 2nd Carrier Air Group. Shortly before VJ-Day the squadron was involved in attacks against the Japanese mainland near Tokyo, two aircraft being lost but the aircrew rescued by a US submarine.
1844	Hellcat	Indomitable	October 1944	From October till December 1944 was spent ashore at China Bay, the squadron then re-embarked on HMS Indomitable for strikes on oil installations at Belawan Deli in Sumatra, and in January 1945 airfields and shore targets were attacked at Pangkalan Brandan as well as the oil refineries at Palembang. The ship then sailed for Australia and the squadron disembarked at Nowra where it was re-equipped with 18 Hellcat IIs. On re-embarking the squadron then took part in attacks on the Sakishima Gunto islands, and on Formosa. Further operations planned for August 1945 were cancelled due to VJ-Day.
1846	Corsair	Colossus	September 1944	September 1944 the squadron joined the 6th Naval Fighter Wing, sailing with HMS Formidable for the Far East, detachments disembarking at North Front, Gibraltar, Dekheila and Colombo till January 1945, embarking again on HMS Formidable in the middle of the month and arriving at Puttalam in February 1945. In March 1945 the squadron re-equipped with Corsair IV. In April and May 1945 the squadron took part in operations against the Sakishimo Gunto islands, and in June the 6th Naval Fighter Wing merged into the 2nd Carrier Air Group. Shortly before VJ-Day the squadron was involved in attacks against the Japanese mainland near Tokyo, two aircraft being lost but the aircrew rescued by a US submarine. The ship then withdrew to Australia. The squadron disembarked temporarily to Ponam just after VJ-Day, re-embarking for Nowra the following day and onwards to the UK in HMS Victorious.
1850	Corsair	Vengeance	July 1945 Onwards	At sea on VJ Day en route to Taiwan, as part of Task Group (TG) 111.2, 11th Aircraft Carrier Squadron, diverted to Hong Kong arriving 29 August.
1851	Corsair	Venerable	March 1945	Part of 15th Carrier Air Group, no action.

== See also ==
- Pacific Station
- United States Battleship Division Nine – An analogous situation in World War I where a US Navy Battleship Division (BatDiv) operated with the Royal Navy's Grand Fleet during 1917-18.
