= HMS Ursa (R22) =

U-class destroyer converted to Type 15 frigate of the Royal Navy

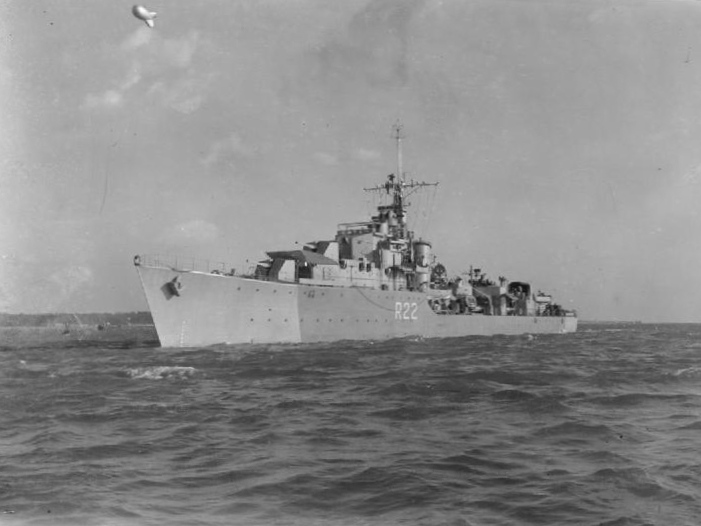
- Ursa in 1944

History

United Kingdom
- Name: HMS Ursa
- Builder: John I. Thornycroft and Company
- Laid down: 2 May 1942
- Launched: 22 July 1943
- Commissioned: 1 March 1944
- Decommissioned: 28 October 1966
- Identification: Pennant number R22/F200
- Fate: Scrapped 1967

General characteristics U-class destroyer
- Class & type: U-class destroyer
- Displacement: 1,777 long tons (1,806 t) standard; 2,058 long tons (2,091 t) full load
- Length: 363 ft (111 m)
- Beam: 35 ft 8 in (10.87 m)
- Draught: 10 ft (3.0 m)
- Propulsion: 2 × Admiralty 3-drum water-tube boilers; Geared steam turbines, 40,000 shp (29,828 kW); 2 shafts
- Speed: 37 knots (43 mph; 69 km/h)
- Range: 4,860 nmi (9,000 km) at 29 kn (54 km/h)
- Complement: 180 (225 in flotilla leader)
- Armament: Original configuration : 4 × QF 4.7-inch (120-mm) Mk XII guns in single mountings CP Mk.XXII; 2 × QF 40 mm Bofors guns in twin mount Mk.IV; 6 × QF 20 mm Oerlikon guns; 2 × twin mounts Mk.V, 2 × single mounts Mk.III; 2 × quadruple tubes for 21 in (533 mm) torpedo Mk.IX

General characteristics Type 15 frigate
- Class & type: Type 15 frigate
- Displacement: 2,300 long tons (2,337 t) standard
- Length: 358 ft (109 m) o/a
- Beam: 37 ft 9 in (11.51 m)
- Draught: 14 ft 6 in (4.42 m)
- Propulsion: 2 × Admiralty 3-drum boilers, steam turbines on 2 shafts, 40,000 shp
- Speed: 31 knots (36 mph; 57 km/h) (full load)
- Complement: 174
- Sensors & processing systems: Radar; Type 293Q target indication (later Type 993); Type 277Q surface search; Type 974 navigation; Type 262 fire control on director CRBF; Type 1010 Cossor Mark 10 IFF; Sonar: Type 174 search; Type 162 target classification; Type 170 attack
- Armament: 1 × twin 4 in gun Mark 19; 1 × twin 40mm Bofors Mk.5; 2 × Squid A/S mortar or; 2 × Limbo Mark 10 A/S mortar

HMS Ursa was a U-class destroyer of the Royal Navy that saw service during the Second World War. She was later converted into a Type 15 fast anti-submarine frigate, with the new pennant number F200.

== Design ==
Ursa was one of eight U-class destroyers ordered as the 7th Emergency Flotilla on 12 June 1941. The U-class were War Emergency Programme destroyers, intended for general duties, including use as anti-submarine escort, and were to be suitable for mass-production. They were based on the hull and machinery of the pre-war J-class destroyers, but with a lighter armament (effectively whatever armament was available) in order to speed production. The U-class were almost identical to the S-class ordered as the 5th Emergency Flotilla and the R-class ordered as the 6th Emergency Flotilla earlier in the year, but were not fitted for operations in Arctic waters.

The U-class were 362 feet 9 inches (110.57 m) long overall, 348 feet 0 inches (106.07 m) at the waterline and 339 feet 6 inches (103.48 m) between perpendiculars, with a beam of 35 feet 8 inches (10.87 m) and a draught of 10 feet 0 inches (3.05 m) mean and 14 feet 3 inches (4.34 m) full load. Displacement was 1,777 long tons (1,806 t) standard and 2,508 long tons (2,548 t) full load. Two Admiralty 3-drum water-tube boilers supplied steam at 300 pounds per square inch (2,100 kPa) and 630 °F (332 °C) to two sets of Parsons single-reduction geared steam turbines, which drove two propeller shafts. The machinery was rated at 40,000 shaft horsepower (30,000 kW) giving a maximum speed of 36 knots (41 mph; 67 km/h) and 32 knots (37 mph; 59 km/h) at full load. 615 tons of oil were carried, giving a range of 4,675 nautical miles (5,380 mi; 8,658 km) at 20 knots (23 mph; 37 km/h).

The ship had a main gun armament of four 4.7 inch (120 mm) QF Mk. IX guns, capable of elevating to an angle of 55 degrees, giving a degree of anti-aircraft capability. The close-in anti-aircraft armament for the class was one Hazemayer stabilised twin mount for the Bofors 40 mm gun and four twin Oerlikon 20 mm cannons. This was modified in 1945, with 5 single 40mm Bofors guns added, with one manually operated Mark III mount in the searchlight position and four power-operated "Boffin" mounts replacing the twin Oerlikon mounts. Two quadruple mounts for 21 inch (533 mm) torpedoes were fitted (these were actually spare quintuple mounts with the centre tube removed), while the ship had a depth charge outfit of four depth charge mortars and two racks, with a total of 70 charges carried.

Ursa was fitted with a Type 291 air warning and Type 276 surface warning radar on the ship's lattice foremast, together with a high-frequency direction finding (HF/DF) aerial. A Type 285 fire control radar integrated with the ship's high-angle gun director, while the Hazemayer mount had an integrated Type 282 radar. The ship had a crew of 179 officers and other ranks.

Ursa was laid down at Thornycroft's Woolston, Southampton shipyard on 2 May 1942 and was launched on 22 July 1943. She was completed on 1 March 1944, and assigned the Pennant number R22.

=== Type 15 modification ===
After the end of the Second World War and as the Cold War started, the Royal Navy found itself with a shortage of fast anti-submarine escorts capable of dealing with modern Soviet diesel-electric submarines, with existing sloops and frigates too slow. At the same time, the relatively recent War Emergency destroyers, with their low-angle guns and basic fire control systems, were considered unsuitable for modern warfare, so it was decided to convert these obsolete destroyers into fast escorts, acting as a stop-gap solution until new-build ships, such as the Type 12 frigates could be built in sufficient numbers. The Type 15 frigate was a rebuild of War Emergency destroyers into 'first-rate' anti-submarine ships, with similar anti-submarine equipment as the new frigates. The ships' superstructure and armament was removed, with the ships' forecastle extended rearwards and a new, low but full width superstructure fitted. The revised ships had a much reduced gun armament of one twin 4-inch (102 mm) anti aircraft mount aft of the main superstructure and one twin Bofors mount, but anti-submarine equipment was as fitted to the Type 12s, with Ursa being fitted with two Limbo anti-submarine mortars, directed by Type 170 and 172 sonar.

== Service history ==
=== Second World War service ===
Ursa was first allocated to the 25th Destroyer Flotilla, serving with the Home Fleet. On 30 March 1944, Ursa left Scapa Flow as part of the Home Fleet covering force for the Arctic Convoy JW 58 to Russia and the return convoy RA 58. On 14–15 May that year, Ursa formed part of the escort for the Escort carriers Emperor and Striker as the carrier's aircraft attacked Rørvik and Stadlandet in Norway.

On 6 June 1944, Ursa, as part of the 25th Destroyer Flotilla, took part in the Normandy landings, supporting the landings on Gold Beach. On the night of 9/10 June, Ursa and the Hunt-class destroyers Glaisdale and Krakowiak were on patrol off Le Havre when they encountered three German torpedo boats of the German 5th Torpedo Boat Flotilla, Möwe, Jaguar and T28 which had sortied from the French port as part of continued German attempts to interfere with invasion shipping. In an inconclusive encounter, the Allied destroyers outmanoeuvred the German force, with no ships on either side damaged. In early August 1944, operations switched to the French Atlantic coast, with the Home Fleet deploying cruiser and destroyer forces to the Bay of Biscay to prevent attempts of German surface units in the French Atlantic ports to escape back to Germany. On the night of 14–15 August, Ursa together with the cruiser Mauritius and the Canadian destroyer Iroquois, attacked a German convoy, consisting of the aircraft repair ship Richthofen, Sperrbrecher 157, the torpedo boat T28 and the minesweepers M275 and M385 off Les Sables-d'Olonne. The British ships sank Sperrbrecher 157 and forced M385 to run aground and become a total loss, while M275 was badly damaged and T24 more lightly damaged, while Iroquois sustained minor damage. On the night of 22/23 August, Ursa, Mauritius and Iroquois ambushed two groups of German patrol boats (Vorpostenboot) off Audierne, sinking V702, V714, V717, V719, V720, V729 and V730.

Ursa was refitted at Portsmouth in September–October 1944, before leaving for the Far East, rejoining the 25 Destroyer Flotilla at Trincomalee, Ceylon (now Sri Lanka) in November that year. She joined the British Pacific Fleet (BPF) when it was formed on 22 November 1944. On 4 January 1945, Ursa took part in Operation Lentil, a strike by aircraft from the carriers Indomitable Indefatigable and Victorious against oil refineries at Pangkalan Brandan, Sumatra. She served with BPF the until 1945. She then returned to the United Kingdom and paid off in 1946.

During the War Ursa was adopted by the Borough of Hendon as part of Warship Week. The plaque from this adoption is held by the National Museum of the Royal Navy in Portsmouth.

=== Post-war service ===
After the Second World War Ursa went into reserve at Portsmouth, transferring to the Chatham reserve in 1952. During 1953 and 1954 Ursa was converted to a Type 15 anti-submarine frigate with the new pennant number F200. On 29 June 1955 Ursa was re-commissioned at Chatham Dockyard under the Command of Commander Powers, RN. After acceptance trials, and work-up at Portland Naval Base, under Flag Officer Sea training (FOST), she then joined the 6th Frigate Squadron, and left in November 1955, for the Royal Naval Fleet on the Mediterranean Station. She arrived at Sliema Creek Malta, in company with sister ships Undine (Captain F), Ulysses and Urania.

On Boxing Day 1955, the whole Squadron put to sea at short notice into heavy seas, whereupon Ulysses lost several crew members overboard from the forecastle area; the survivors being rescued by a Maltese tug.

Ursa undertook regular anti-gunrunning patrols off Cyprus. Patrolling the island, in company with other members of the squadron, the object of the patrols was trying to thwart the efforts of EOKA (terrorist groups who were fighting for independence from British rule). These patrols were generally of six weeks duration, and then a relief.

In June–July 1956 she underwent a minor refit of approximately five weeks in Gibraltar, later going into the King George IV dry dock, with the whole squadron (and two minesweepers) for maintenance.

In November 1956, with the rest of the squadron, Ursa formed part of the Royal Navy's force used during the Suez Operation. This was an Anglo-French-Israeli campaign to recapture the Suez Canal. Ursa was initially attached to the carrier force providing anti-submarine screening, and crash destroyer duties for the aircraft carriers Albion and Bulwark. Towards the end of the brief Suez campaign, she was transferred to providing anti-submarine screening and protection for the tanker force.

She decommissioned in April 1957 at Chatham Dockyard.

In April 1959 Ursa started a refit in Malta Dockyard, but work was stopped after six weeks and Ursa placed in reserve, and did not resume until 1961 at Bailey's Dockyard, Malta, with the ship recommissioning in November that year and joining the 5th Frigate Squadron. She returned to home waters in June, reaching Devonport on 27 June. On the night of 1/2 August 1962, while on anti-submarine exercises in the Firth of Clyde, Scotland, she collided with the destroyer Battleaxe. Ursa suffered a damaged bow, while Battleaxe suffered more consequentially, being struck athwartships, with her hull split down to the keel. While Ursa was repaired, the damage to Battleaxe was considered beyond economic repair, and Battleaxe was therefore decommissioned and scrapped. Two officers and one Chief Petty Officer from Ursa's crew were reprimanded in courts-martial resulting from the collision.

In March 1963 Ursa relieved Troubridge in the 8th Frigate Squadron, and served as West Indies guard ship from June 1963 until June 1964. She again served in the Bahamas and West Indies in 1966 before paying off at Portsmouth on 28 October that year.

== Decommissioning and disposal ==
Ursa continued in service until paying off at Devonport for the last time on 28 October 1966. She was subsequently sold for scrapping and arrived at Cashmore's in Newport in 1967.

== Bibliography ==
- Colledge, J. J.; Warlow, Ben (2006) [1969]. Ships of the Royal Navy: The Complete Record of All Fighting Ships of the Royal Navy from the 15th Century to the Present (3rd Rev ed.). London: Chatham Publishing. ISBN 978-1-86176-281-8. OCLC 67375475.
- Critchley, Mike (1982). British Warships Since 1945: Part 3: Destroyers. Liskeard, UK: Maritime Books. ISBN 0-9506323-9-2.
- English, John (2008). Obdurate to Daring: British Fleet Destroyers 1941–45. Windsor, UK: World Ship Society. ISBN 978-0-9560769-0-8.
- Friedman, Norman (2008). British Destroyers & Frigates: The Second World War and After. Barnsley, UK: Seaforth Publishing. ISBN 978-1-84832-015-4.
- Gardiner, Robert; Chesneau, Roger, eds. (1980). Conway's All The World's Fighting Ships 1922–1946. London: Conway Maritime Press. ISBN 0-85177-146-7.
- Gardiner, Robert; Chumbley, Stephen, eds. (1995). Conway's All The World's Fighting Ships 1947–1995. Annapolis, Maryland, USA: Naval Institute Press. ISBN 1-55750-132-7.
- Hobbs, David (2017). The British Pacific Fleet: The Royal Navy's Most Powerful Strike Force. Barnsley, UK: Seaforth Publishing. ISBN 978-1-5267-0283-8.
- Paterson, Lawrence (2017). Hitler's Forgotten Flotillas: Kriegsmarine Security Flotillas. Barnsley, UK: Seaforth Publishing. ISBN 978-1-4738-8239-3.
- Lenton, H.T. (1970). Navies of the Second World War: British Fleet & Escort Destroyers Volume Two. London: Macdonald & Co. ISBN 0-356-03122-5.
- Marriott, Leo (1989). Royal Navy Destroyers since 1945. Ian Allan. ISBN 0-7110-1817-0.
- Marriott, Leo (1983). Royal Navy Frigates 1945–1983. Shepperton, UK: Ian Allan. ISBN 0-7110-1322-5.
- O'Hara, Vincent P. (2011). The German Fleet at War, 1939–1945 (eBook ed.). Annapolis, Maryland, USA: Naval Institute Press. ISBN 978-1-61251-397-3.
- Raven, Alan; Roberts, John (1978). War Built Destroyers O to Z Classes. London: Bivouac Books. ISBN 0-85680-010-4.
- Richardson, Ian (August 2021). Osborne, Richard (ed.). "Type 15 Frigates, Part 2: Ship Histories". Warships: Marine News Supplement. 75 (8): 381–391. ISSN 0966-6958.
- Roskill, S. W. (1961). The War at Sea 1939–1945: Volume III: The Offensive Part II: 1st June 1944 – 14th August 1945. History of the Second World War: United Kingdom Military Series. London: Her Majesty's Stationery Office.
- Rohwer, Jürgen; Hümmelchen, Gerhard (1992). Chronology of the War at Sea 1939–1945. London: Greenhill Books. ISBN 1-85367-117-7.
- Whitley, M. J. (1988). Destroyers of World War 2. Annapolis, Maryland: Naval Institute Press. ISBN 0-87021-326-1.
- Whitley, M. J. (2000). Destroyers of World War 2: An International Encyclopedia. London: Cassell & Co. ISBN 1-85409-521-8.
- Winser, John de S. (1994). The D-Day Ships: Neptune: the Greatest Amphibious Operation in History. Kendal, England: World Ship Society. ISBN 0-905617-75-4.
