= D72 =

D72 may refer to:

- D. 72, Wind Octet in F major for two oboes, two clarinets, two horns and two bassoons by Franz Schubert
- HMS Ruler (D72), Ruler-class escort aircraft carrier of the British Royal Navy during World War II
- HMS Veteran (D72), Admiralty modified W-class destroyer built for the Royal Navy
