= HMS Urania =

Frigate of the Royal Navy

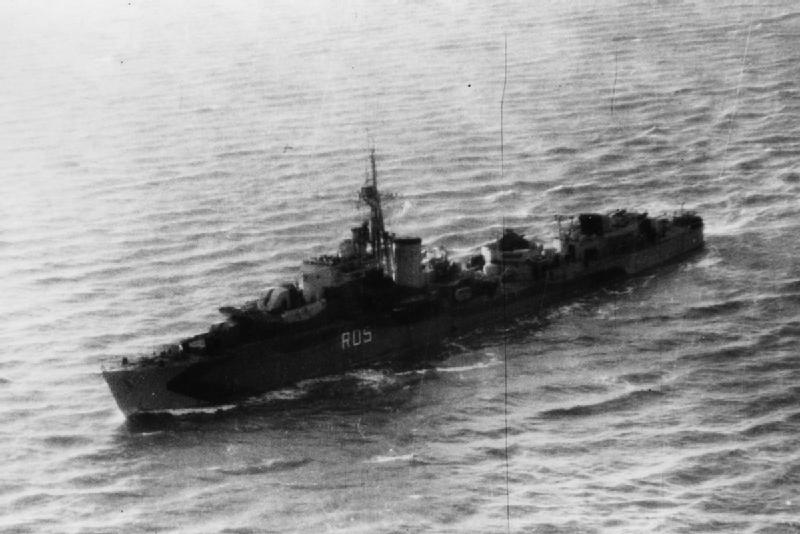
- Urania in April 1944

History

United Kingdom
- Name: HMS Urania
- Builder: Vickers-Armstrongs
- Laid down: 18 June 1942
- Launched: 19 May 1943
- Commissioned: 18 January 1944
- Identification: Pennant number R05/F08
- Fate: Scrapped 1971

General characteristics V-class destroyer
- Class & type: V-class destroyer
- Displacement: 1,777 long tons (1,806 t) standard; 2,058 long tons (2,091 t) full load
- Length: 363 ft (111 m)
- Beam: 35 ft 8 in (10.87 m)
- Draught: 10 ft (3.0 m)
- Propulsion: 2 × Admiralty 3-drum water-tube boilers; Geared steam turbines, 40,000 shp (29,828 kW); 2 shafts
- Speed: 37 knots (43 mph; 69 km/h)
- Range: 4,860 nmi (9,000 km) at 29 kn (54 km/h)
- Complement: 180 (225 in flotilla leader)
- Armament: Original configuration : 4 × QF 4.7-inch (120-mm) Mk XII guns in single mountings CP Mk.XXII; 2 × QF 40 mm Bofors guns in twin mount Mk.IV; 6 × QF 20 mm Oerlikon guns; 2 × twin mounts Mk.V, 2 × single mounts Mk.III; 2 × quadruple tubes for 21 in (533 mm) torpedo Mk.IX

General characteristics Type 15 frigate
- Class & type: Type 15 frigate
- Displacement: 2,300 long tons (2,337 t) standard
- Length: 358 ft (109 m) o/a
- Beam: 37 ft 9 in (11.51 m)
- Draught: 14 ft 6 in (4.42 m)
- Propulsion: 2 × Admiralty 3-drum boilers, steam turbines on 2 shafts, 40,000 shp
- Speed: 31 knots (36 mph; 57 km/h) (full load)
- Complement: 174
- Sensors & processing systems: Radar; Type 293Q target indication (later Type 993); Type 277Q surface search; Type 974 navigation; Type 262 fire control on director CRBF; Type 1010 Cossor Mark 10 IFF; Sonar: Type 174 search; Type 162 target classification; Type 170 attack
- Armament: 1 × twin 4 in gun Mark 19; 1 × twin 40mm Bofors Mk.5; 2 × Squid A/S mortar or; 2 × Limbo Mark 10 A/S mortar

HMS Urania was a U-class destroyer of the British Royal Navy that saw service during World War II. After the war she was converted into a Type 15 fast anti-submarine frigate and was scrapped in 1971.

== Service history ==
=== Second World War service ===
Urania saw service during the Second World War as part of the British Pacific Fleet.

=== Post War service ===
From 1947 until 1950 Urania was held in reserve at Devonport Dockyard. She was converted into a reserve fleet accommodation ship in 1949, and was based at Devonport. On 11 November 1950 she arrived at Hawthorn Leslie on the Tyne for a refit and was again in reserve at Harwich in 1952.

On 23 April 1953 she arrived in Liverpool for conversion into a Type 15 fast anti-submarine frigate, by Harland and Wolff. Her pennant number was also changed from R05 to F08.

On completion of her conversion she was commissioned on 2 January 1955 into the 6th Frigate Squadron, for service in the Mediterranean, with other Type 15 frigates Ursa, Undine and Ulysses. They collectively took part in the Suez Operation and Cyprus emergency before returning home.

In 1958 she was returned to the reserve at Devonport dockyard before another refit. On 7 January 1959 she re-commissioned for trials before returning to reserve.

=== Decommissioning and disposal ===
From 1962 until 1967 she was held in reserve at Devonport. In January 1967 she was transferred to the operational reserve. She was subsequently sold for scrap and arrived at Faslane for breaking up on 2 February 1971.

== Publications ==
- Colledge, J. J.; Warlow, Ben (2006) [1969]. Ships of the Royal Navy: The Complete Record of All Fighting Ships of the Royal Navy from the 15th Century to the Present (3rd Rev ed.). London: Chatham Publishing. ISBN 978-1-86176-281-8. OCLC 67375475.
- Marriott, Leo (1994). Royal Navy Destroyers since 1945. Ian Allan. ISBN 0-7110-1817-0.
- Raven, Alan; Roberts, John (1978). War Built Destroyers O to Z Classes. London: Bivouac Books. ISBN 0-85680-010-4.
- Richardson, Ian (August 2021). Osborne, Richard (ed.). "Type 15 Frigates, Part 2: Ship Histories". Warships: Marine News Supplement. 75 (8): 381–391. ISSN 0966-6958.
- Whitley, M. J. (1988). Destroyers of World War 2. Annapolis, Maryland: Naval Institute Press. ISBN 0-87021-326-1.
