= Greek ship Aliakmon =

At least two ships of the Hellenic Navy have borne the name Aliakmon:

- Greek landing ship Aliakmon (L104), a LST(3)-class tank landing ship launched in 1945 as HMS LST 3002 she was renamed on transfer to Greece in 1947. She was sold in 1971 and broken up in the following year
- Greek support ship Aliakmon (A470), a Lüneburg-class support ship launched in 1966 as the West German Navy Saarburg she was renamed on transfer to Greece in 1994
