= 30th Aircraft Carrier Squadron =

Former aircraft carrier formation of the Royal Navy

- White Ensign
- Active: January–August 1945
- Country: United Kingdom
- Allegiance: British Empire
- Branch: Royal Navy
- Garrison/HQ: BPF Fleet HQ: Sydney, Australia; BPF forward base; Seeadler Harbor, Manus Island

Commanders
- Notable commanders: Commodore, William P. Carne

The 30th Aircraft Carrier Squadron also called Thirtieth Aircraft Carrier Squadron was a military formation of escort aircraft carriers of the Royal Navy that was part of the British Pacific Fleet from January to August 1945.

== History ==
The 30th Aircraft Carrier Squadron was established in January 1945 with Commodore William. P. Carne taking command in March 1945. The 30th Aircraft Carrier Squadron (30 ACS), consisted of nine escort carriers and was solely assigned to the British Pacific Fleet. From March to April 1945 it was the fleet's Air Train.

== Administration ==
=== Commodore, Commanding, 30th Aircraft Carrier Squadron ===
Included:

	Rank	Flag	Name	Term	Notes
Commodore, Commanding, 30th Aircraft Carrier Squadron
1	Commodore		William P. Carne	January to August 1945	

== Composition ==
Included:

(United Kingdom) : 30th Aircraft Carrier Squadron; British Pacific Fleet January to August 1945

Ship	Dates	Notes and references
HMS Striker	March to August 1945	(flag ship, 30th Aircraft Carrier Squadron) Attacker-class escort carrier
HMS Arbiter	ditto	Ruler-class escort carrier
HMS Chaser	ditto	Attacker-class escort carrier
HMS Fencer	ditto	Attacker-class escort carrier
HMS Ruler	ditto	Ruler-class escort carrier
HMS Reaper	ditto	Ruler-class escort carrier
HMS Slinger	ditto	Ruler-class escort carrier
HMS Speaker	ditto	Ruler-class escort carrier
HMS Vindex	ditto	Nairana-class escort carrier

== Sources ==
- Drury, Tony. "A History of H.M.S. STRIKER". royalnavyresearcharchive.org.uk. T. Drury. 11 May 2017.
- Hobbs, David (2012). The British Pacific Fleet: The Royal Navy's Most Powerful Strike Force. Barnsley, England: Seaforth Publishing. ISBN 9781783469222.
- Polmar, Norman (2006). Aircraft Carriers: A History of Carrier Aviation and Its Influence on World Events, Volume I: 1909–1945. Lincoln, Nebraska: Potomac Books, Inc. ISBN 9781597973441.
