= HMS LST 3002 =

1945 LST(3)-class tank landing ship

History

United Kingdom
- Name: LST 3002
- Builder: Swan Hunter
- Commissioned: August 1945
- Decommissioned: November 1946
- Fate: Sold to the Greek Navy, April 1947

History

Greece
- Name: Aliakmon (L104)
- Acquired: April 1947
- Fate: Scrapped 1972

General characteristics
- Type: Landing Ship, Tank

HMS LST 3002 was one of the first of her class of tank landing ship (LST). She had a short but interesting career which demonstrated the robustness of the design and construction of her class of ship.

She was built at Swan Hunter's yard on the Tyne and commissioned in August 1945 after acceptance trials. She sailed from the Tyne through the Pentland Firth to the Gareloch, encountering and sinking a floating contact mine on the way. She took aboard stores at Roseneath and worked up off the Clyde during September. She sailed for the Far East independently.

She left Suez at 0600 on 9 December. After passing through the Suez Canal into the Gulf of Suez with a cargo of Scammel tank transporters, she was rammed in calm conditions at 0028 on 10 December, by the Victory ship, SS Poland Victory, about 120 miles (190 km) south of Suez. She was struck just about midships causing a hole about 44 ft (13 m) wide on the upper deck and 32 ft (9.8 m) wide at the keel and cutting the LST almost in two, leaving just about 10 ft (3.0 m) to hold her together. One of the ship's boats was damaged in the collision and the other seemed reluctant to yield to gravity. The crew of the LST abandoned ship, being taken aboard Poland Victory by rope ladder while she held position embedded in the LST. One crew member lost his life in the accident. He was Able Seaman Keith Larcombe and is buried in the Suez War Memorial Cemetery.

LST 3002 was still afloat next morning and a skeleton crew re-boarded her. The rest of the crew were carried off by Poland Victory. The Algerine-class minesweeper HMS Maenad attended until the Royal Fleet Auxiliary ships Prince Salvor and Salvage Duke took the LST in tow slowly back to Port Taufiq (or Tewfik) arriving there of the afternoon of 12 December. There, she was dry docked in the small shipyard for temporary repairs, the skeleton crew remaining on board.

Repairs included fitting great strongback girders straddling the hole and plating over the gap. Now seaworthy again, but still showing signs of injury, in July 1946 she sailed to Dockyard Creek, Valletta Harbour, Malta to complete the repairs in dry dock. Repairs completed in September 1946, she returned home, calling in at Gibraltar on the way, paying off pennant flying boldly. She was decommissioned at Roseneath in November 1946. This incident put the reputation of the LST (Large Slow Target) to be virtually unsinkable to a severe test. Much of the shock of the collision was taken by the tank transporters without which this LST would have been cut in two. Remarkably, the two parts of the partially severed vessel sailed comfortably together, thanks no doubt to the excellence of the design and construction, but also to the skill with which she had been ballasted.

== Greek service ==
In April 1947, she was sold to the Greek Navy to become Aliakmon (L104). She was sold in 1971 and broken up the following year.
