= HMS Undine (R42) =

U-class destroyer converted to Type 15 frigate of the Royal Navy

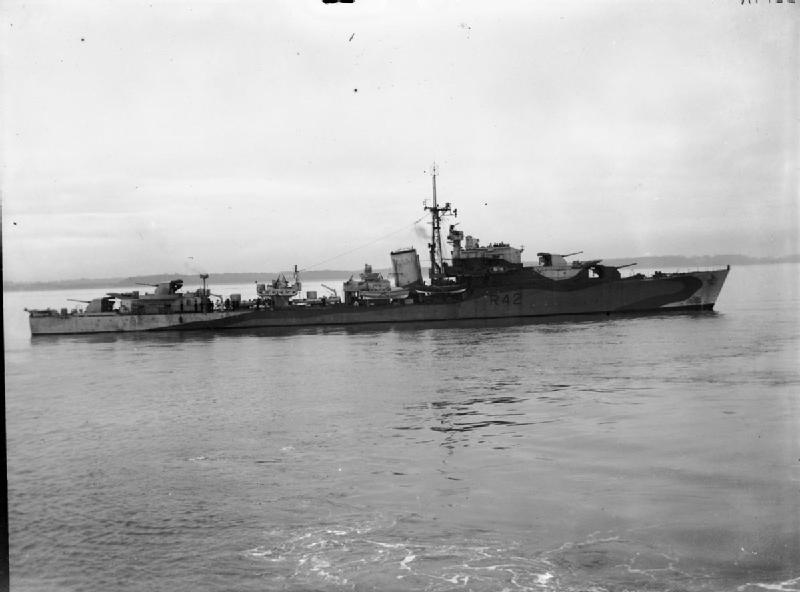
- Undine in December 1943

History

United Kingdom
- Name: HMS Undine
- Builder: John I. Thornycroft and Company
- Laid down: 18 March 1942
- Launched: 1 June 1943
- Commissioned: 23 December 1943
- Decommissioned: 1960
- Identification: Pennant number R42
- Fate: Sold for scrap, November 1965

General characteristics U-class destroyer
- Class & type: U-class destroyer
- Displacement: 1,777 long tons (1,806 t) standard; 2,058 long tons (2,091 t) full load
- Length: 363 ft (111 m)
- Beam: 35 ft 8 in (10.87 m)
- Draught: 10 ft (3.0 m)
- Propulsion: 2 × Admiralty 3-drum water-tube boilers; Geared steam turbines, 40,000 shp (29,828 kW); 2 shafts
- Speed: 37 knots (43 mph; 69 km/h)
- Range: 4,860 nmi (9,000 km) at 29 kn (54 km/h)
- Complement: 180 (225 in flotilla leader)
- Armament: Original configuration : 4 × QF 4.7-inch (120-mm) Mk XII guns in single mountings CP Mk.XXII; 2 × QF 40 mm Bofors guns in twin mount Mk.IV; 6 × QF 20 mm Oerlikon guns; 2 × twin mounts Mk.V, 2 × single mounts Mk.III; 2 × quadruple tubes for 21 in (533 mm) torpedo Mk.IX

General characteristics Type 15 frigate
- Class & type: Type 15 frigate
- Displacement: 2,300 long tons (2,337 t) standard
- Length: 358 ft (109 m) o/a
- Beam: 37 ft 9 in (11.51 m)
- Draught: 14 ft 6 in (4.42 m)
- Propulsion: 2 × Admiralty 3-drum boilers, steam turbines on 2 shafts, 40,000 shp
- Speed: 31 knots (36 mph; 57 km/h) (full load)
- Complement: 174
- Sensors & processing systems: Radar; Type 293Q target indication (later Type 993); Type 277Q surface search; Type 974 navigation; Type 262 fire control on director CRBF; Type 1010 Cossor Mark 10 IFF; Sonar: Type 174 search; Type 162 target classification; Type 170 attack
- Armament: 1 × twin 4 in gun Mark 19; 1 × twin 40mm Bofors Mk.5; 2 × Squid A/S mortar or; 2 × Limbo Mark 10 A/S mortar

HMS Undine was a U-class destroyer of the British Royal Navy that saw service during World War II. On 27 March 1945, HMS Undine detached from RN Fast Carrier TF57 to rescue the airmen of a downed RN TBF Avenger aircraft also rescued a USN Corsair pilot adrift for two days south of the Sakishima Gunto in the Philippine Sea.

== Design and construction ==
Undine was one of eight U-class destroyers ordered as the 7th Emergency Flotilla on 12 June 1941. The U-class were War Emergency Programme destroyers, intended for general duties, including use as anti-submarine escort, and were to be suitable for mass-production. They were based on the hull and machinery of the pre-war J-class destroyers, but with a lighter armament (effectively whatever armament was available) in order to speed production. The U-class were almost identical to the S-class ordered as the 5th Emergency Flotilla and the T-class ordered as the 6th Emergency Flotilla earlier in the year, but were not fitted for operations in Arctic waters.

The U-class were 362 feet 9 inches (110.57 m) long overall, 348 feet 0 inches (106.07 m) at the waterline and 339 feet 6 inches (103.48 m) between perpendiculars, with a beam of 35 feet 8 inches (10.87 m) and a draught of 10 feet 0 inches (3.05 m) mean and 14 feet 3 inches (4.34 m) full load. Displacement was 1,777 long tons (1,806 t) standard and 2,508 long tons (2,548 t) full load. Two Admiralty 3-drum water-tube boilers supplied steam at 300 pounds per square inch (2,100 kPa) and 630 °F (332 °C) to two sets of Parsons single-reduction geared steam turbines, which drove two propeller shafts. The machinery was rated at 40,000 shaft horsepower (30,000 kW) giving a maximum speed of 36 knots (41 mph; 67 km/h) and 32 knots (37 mph; 59 km/h) at full load. 615 tons of oil were carried, giving a range of 4,675 nautical miles (5,380 mi; 8,658 km) at 20 knots (23 mph; 37 km/h).

The ship had a main gun armament of four 4.7 inch (120 mm) QF Mk. IX guns, capable of elevating to an angle of 55 degrees, giving a degree of anti-aircraft capability. The designed close-in anti-aircraft armament for the class was one Hazemayer stabilised twin mount for the Bofors 40 mm gun and four twin Oerlikon 20 mm cannons, although the Bofors was replaced by two more twin Oerlikons on Undine as built. The twin Bofors mount was later re-instated, and five more single Bofors added, with one on the searchlight platform, and four single power operated "Boffin" mounts replaced the remaining twin Oerlikons. Two quadruple mounts for 21 inch (533 mm) torpedoes were fitted (these were actually spare quintuple mounts with the centre tube removed), while the ship had a depth charge outfit of four depth charge mortars and two racks, with a total of 70 charges carried.

Undine was laid down at Thornycroft's Woolston, Southampton shipyard on 18 March 1942 and was launched on 1 June 1943. She was completed on 23 December 1943, and assigned the Pennant number R42.

=== Type 15 modification ===
After the end of the Second World War and as the Cold War started, the Royal Navy found itself with a shortage of fast anti-submarine escorts capable of dealing with modern Soviet diesel-electric submarines, with existing sloops and frigates too slow. At the same time, the relatively recent War Emergency destroyers, with their low-angle guns and basic fire control systems, were considered unsuitable for modern warfare, so it was decided to convert these obsolete destroyers into fast escorts, acting as a stop-gap solution until new-build ships, such as the Type 12 frigates could be built in sufficient numbers. The Type 15 frigate was a rebuild of War Emergency destroyers into 'first-rate' anti-submarine ships, with similar anti-submarine equipment as the new frigates. The ships' superstructure and armament was removed, with the ships' forecastle extended rearwards and a new, low but full width superstructure fitted. The revised ships had a much reduced gun armament of one twin 4-inch (102 mm) anti aircraft mount aft of the main superstructure and one twin Bofors mount, but anti-submarine equipment was as fitted to the Type 12s, with Undine being fitted with two Limbo anti-submarine mortars, directed by Type 170 and 172 sonar.

== Service ==
=== Second World War ===
After commissioning, Undine worked up at Scapa Flow before joining the 25th Destroyer Flotilla in the Mediterranean on 2 February 1944. The 25th Destroyer Flotilla, including Undine, transferred back to British waters for the invasion of Normandy in June 1944, with Undine escorting Bombardment force K, the support force for Gold Beach on 6 June and providing gunfire support for the landings until 8 June. Undine returned to the Mediterranean with the rest of the 25th Flotilla by the end of June, carrying out bombardments against targets on the Adriatic coast in September 1944.

Undine was refitted at Chatham Dockyard from 25 September to 18 November 1944, before being sent (still as part of the 25th Flotilla) to join the British Pacific Fleet, reaching Trincomalee in Ceylon (now Sri Lanka) in December that year. On 4 January 1945, Undine took part in Operation Lentil, a strike by aircraft from the British carriers Indomitable, Indefatigable and Victorious against oil installations at Pangkalan Brandan, Sumatra. Undine rescued the crew of an Avenger bomber that had ditched due to engine trouble. On 16 January 1945, Undine sailed from Trincomalee as the British Pacific Fleet transferred to the Pacific, taking part in Operation Meridian, carrier strikes against Sumatran oil refineries on 24 January and 29 January. Undine rescued the crew from an Avenger that ditched shortly after takeoff from Indomitable during the 29 January attack.

In March–April 1945, the British Pacific Fleet carried out a series of attacks against Japanese airfields in the Sakishima Gunto, in support of Operation Iceberg, the American invasion of Okinawa. Undine supported these operations, and on 26 March was despatched from the fleet to rescue a pilot whose aircraft had been shot down over Miyako-jima. While Undine failed to find the Fleet Air Arm pilot (who was later picked up by the American submarine USS Kingfish), the destroyer did rescue an American pilot who had been shot down off Okinawa three days earlier. Undine continued to escort the ships of the British Pacific Fleet as it carried out further attacks against the airfields in the Sakishima Gunto in May 1945, including forming part of the escort for the battleships King George V, Howe and the cruisers Swiftsure, Uganda, Gambia, Euryalus and Black Prince when they shelled airfields on the islands on 4 May.

In July–August 1945, the British Pacific Fleet made a series of attacks against the Japanese Home islands in conjunction with the US Navy, with Undine again operating as part of the 25th Destroyer Flotilla. On the night of 29/30 July, Undine, together with the destroyers Urania and Ulysses escorted King George V when she shelled factories producing aircraft propellers near Hamamatsu. During the bombardment, Undine opened fire twice at groups of small craft (which were probably fishing boats), which turned away from the task group. Most of the British Fleet, including Undine, left the station off Japan on 12 August. She left Fremantle, Australia on 18 February 1946, bound for the UK. arriving at Chatham in March 1946.

=== Post-war service ===
In 1946 Undine returned from the Far East and went into reserve at Harwich. In May 1949 she underwent a refit at Chatham and from March 1950 was in the Sheerness reserve. From 1952 to 1953 she was converted into a Type 15 fast anti-submarine frigate, by Alexander Stephen and Sons at their Glasgow shipyard, being allocated the new pennant number F141.

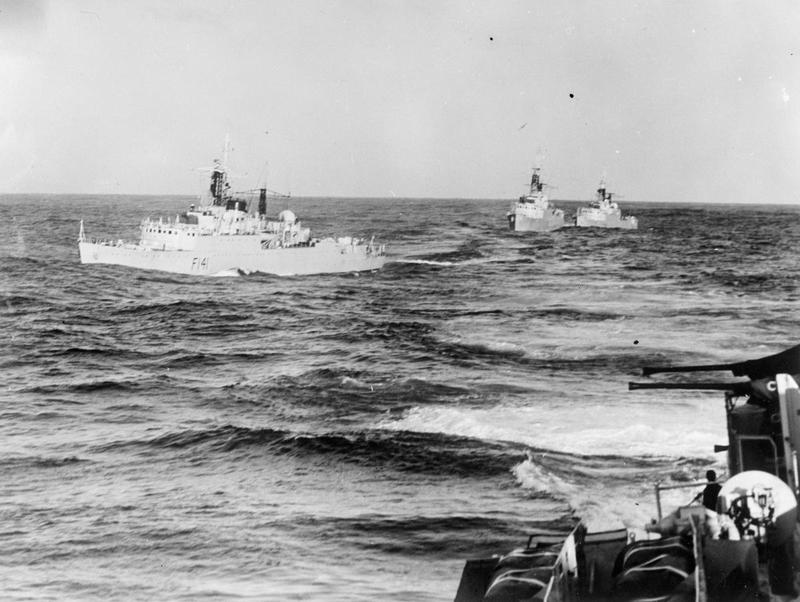
Undine after conversion to a Type 15 Frigate, leads ships of the 6th Frigate Squadron in line ahead on their passage to Gibraltar, for spring cruise, 27 January 1957 (IWM A 33691)

On completion of her conversion, Undine was reduced to Class I reserve. (Note: Ships in Class I reserve were maintained free from major defects and with a nucleus crew, so they could begin work-up to active service on 14 day notice.) She re-commissioned on 17 August 1954, replacing the Type 15 frigate Verulam in the 6th Frigate Squadron, which alternated between duty in the Mediterranean and Home waters until 1960. From 26 December 1955 to early January 1956, Undine was deployed with the 6th Frigate Squadron on anti-smuggling patrols off Cyprus. In November 1956 she was part of the Royal Navy's forces that took part in the Suez Crisis. In July 1957, Undine was refitted at Malta. On 27 October 1958, the 6th Frigate Squadron, including Undine, was off Ushant on passage from Portland to Gibraltar, when she suffered a loss of power, and while trying to turn out of line was hit by sister ship Ulysses. Both ships received minor damage and had to return to Devonport for repairs. In the years 1958/59 she undertook bombardments of EOKA's positions in the Cyprus mountains.

In December 1959, during the First Cod War, Undine was part of the Fisheries Protection Squadron, operating off Iceland, but in March 1960, in a bid to reduce tensions prior to negotiations, Royal Navy ships, including Undine were withdrawn from the disputed waters.

== Decommissioning and disposal ==
While Undine recommissioned back into the 6th Frigate Squadron in April 1960, she suffered defects that would require docking for rectification, which would prevent her from meeting the ship's programme of operational deployments. She was therefore paid off on 28 October 1960, with her crew transferring to Rocket, which was brought out of reserve to replace Undine in the 6th Frigate Squadron. Undine was put on the Disposal List in September 1961, and arrived at the Newport, Wales of shipbreaker John Cashmore Ltd for scrapping on 12 November 1965.
