= HMS Odzani =

River-class frigate of the Royal Navy

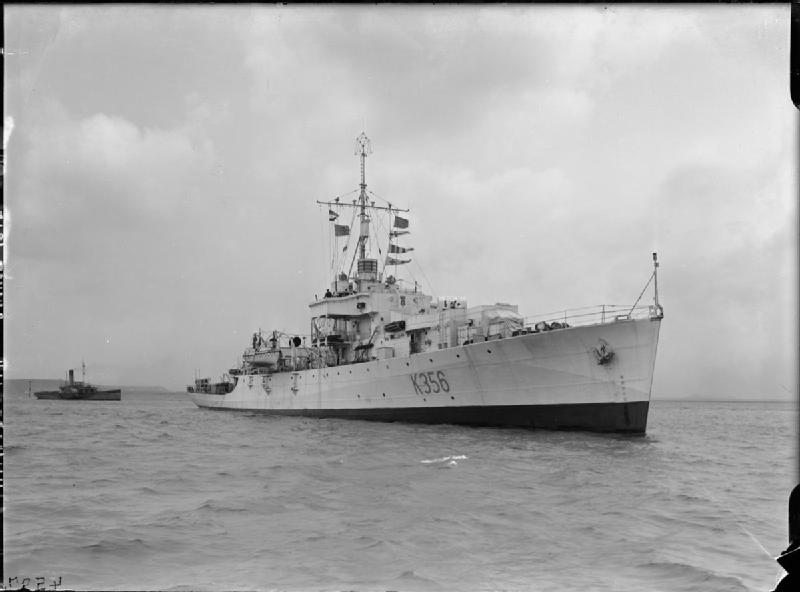
- Odzani in August 1943

History

United Kingdom
- Name: HMS Odzani
- Builder: Smiths Dock Co., South Bank-on-Tees
- Laid down: 18 November 1942
- Launched: 19 May 1943
- Commissioned: 2 September 1943
- Fate: Scrapped June 1957

General characteristics
- Class & type: River-class frigate
- Displacement: 1,370 long tons (1,390 t); 1,830 long tons (1,860 t) (deep load)
- Length: 283 ft (86.26 m) p/p; 301.25 ft (91.82 m)o/a
- Beam: 36.5 ft (11.13 m)
- Draught: 9 ft (2.74 m); 13 ft (3.96 m) (deep load)
- Propulsion: 2 x Admiralty 3-drum boilers, 2 shafts, reciprocating vertical triple expansion, 5,500 ihp (4,100 kW)
- Speed: 20 knots (37.0 km/h)
- Range: 646 long tons (656 t) oil fuel; 7,500 nautical miles (13,890 km) at 15 knots (27.8 km/h)
- Complement: 140
- Armament: 2 × QF 4 in (102 mm) /40 Mk.XIX, single mounts CP Mk.XXIII; up to 10 x QF 20 mm Oerlikon A/A on twin mounts Mk.V and single mounts Mk.III; 1 × Hedgehog 24 spigot A/S projector; up to 150 depth charges

HMS Odzani (K356) was a River-class frigate that served in the Royal Navy.

== Construction and design ==
Odzani was one of three River-class frigates ordered by the British Admiralty on 15 July 1942. She was named after a river in Mashonaland (then part of Southern Rhodesia, now part of Zimbabwe) following the loss of the destroyer Mashona in 1941. The ship was laid down at Smith Dock's Middlesbrough shipyard on 18 November 1942, was launched on 19 May 1943 and completed on 2 September that year.

The River-class ships were 301 feet 4 inches (91.85 m) long overall and 283 feet 0 inches (86.26 m) between perpendiculars, with a beam of 36 feet 6 inches (11.13 m) and a draught of 11 feet 10 inches (3.61 m). Displacement was 1,397 long tons (1,419 t) standard and 1,925 long tons (1,956 t) deep load.
