= SS Bursa =

Tanker built for the Ministry of War Transport in 1941

History
- Name: Empire Crest (1944-46); Bursa (1946-61)
- Owner: Ministry of War Transport (1944-46); Anglo-Saxon Petroleum Co Ltd (1946-55); Shell Tankers Ltd (1955-61)
- Operator: Anglo-Saxon Petroleum Co Ltd (1941-55); Shell Petroleum Co Ltd (1955-61)
- Port of registry: (United Kingdom) Sunderland
- Builder: Sir J Laing & Sons Ltd
- Yard number: 760
- Launched: 7 July 1944
- Completed: September 1944
- Out of service: 1961
- Identification: United Kingdom Official Number 180143; Code Letters GBKG
- Fate: Scrapped

General characteristics
- Tonnage: 3,750 GRT; 2,002 NRT; 5,168 DWT
- Length: 344 ft (105 m)
- Beam: 48 ft (15 m)
- Propulsion: Triple expansion steam engine

Bursa was a 3,750 GRT tanker that was built in 1941 as Empire Crest by Sir J Laing & Sons, Sunderland, United Kingdom. She was built for the Ministry of War Transport (MoWT). In 1946, she was sold into merchant service and renamed Bursa. She served until she was scrapped in 1961

== Description ==
The ship was built in 1944 by Sir J Laing & Sons Ltd, Sunderland. Yard number 760, she was launched on 7 July and completed in September.

The ship was 344 feet (105 m) long, with a beam of 48 feet (15 m). She was assessed at 3,750 GRT 2,002 NRT. Her DWT was 5,168.

The ship was propelled by a triple expansion steam engine.

== History ==
Empire Crest was built for the MoWT. She was placed under the management of Anglo-Saxon Petroleum Co Ltd. The Official Number 180143 was allocated. Her port of registry was Sunderland and the Code Letters GBKG were allocated. Empire Crest spent the war years sailing around the coast of the United Kingdom, with some voyages to France from December 1944.

In 1946, Empire Crest was sold to her managers and was renamed Bursa. In 1955, Bursa was sold to Shell Tankers Ltd and placed under the management of Shell Petroleum Co Ltd. She served until 1961 when she was scrapped at Sungei Perampuan, Singapore.
