= HMS Ruler =

1943 Ruler-class escort carrier of the Royal Navy

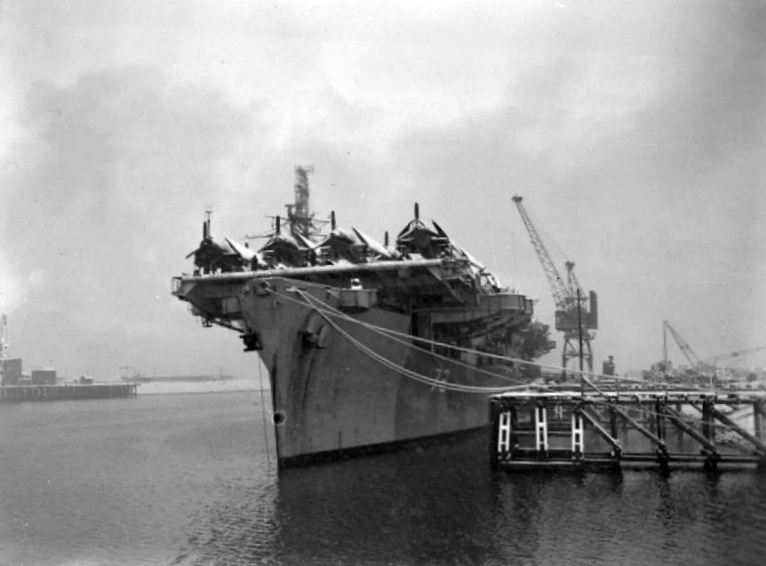
- HMS Ruler in January 1945

History

United States
- Name: USS St. Joseph
- Namesake: St. Joseph Bay in Florida
- Builder: Seattle-Tacoma Shipbuilding Corporation
- Laid down: 25 March 1943
- Launched: 21 August 1943
- Fate: Transferred to Royal Navy

United Kingdom
- Name: HMS Ruler
- Commissioned: 22 December 1943
- Decommissioned: 29 January 1946
- Stricken: 20 March 1946
- Identification: Pennant number D72 (Atlantic) - R311/A731 (Pacific)
- Honours and awards: Atlantic 1944; Okinawa 1945
- Fate: Scrapped, 1946

General characteristics
- Class & type: Bogue-class escort carrier (US); Ruler-class escort carrier (UK)
- Displacement: 15,390 tons
- Length: 492 ft (150 m)
- Beam: 108 ft 6 in (33.07 m)
- Draught: 26 ft (7.9 m)
- Propulsion: Steam turbines, 1 shaft, 8,500 shp (6.3 MW)
- Speed: 18 knots (33 km/h)
- Complement: 646 officers and men
- Armament: 2 × 4"/50, 5"/38 or 5"/51 guns; 8 × twin 40 mm Bofors; 35 × single 20 mm Oerlikon
- Aircraft carried: 30

Service record
- Part of: British Pacific Fleet
- Operations: Battle of Okinawa

HMS Ruler was the lead ship of her class of escort carrier of the Royal Navy during the Second World War. She was built in the United States as the Bogue-class carrier St. Joseph (AVG/CVE/ACV-50) for Lend-Lease to the United Kingdom.

== Construction ==
The name St. Joseph (making her the first United States Navy ship named for St. Joseph Bay, Florida) was assigned to MC hull 261, a converted C3-S-A1 cargo ship, on 23 August 1942. She was laid down on 25 March 1943 by the Seattle-Tacoma Shipbuilding Corporation of Tacoma, Washington. She was redesignated CVE-50 on 15 July, launched on 21 August 1943 and sponsored by Mrs. W.W. Smyth. The carrier was transferred to the United Kingdom on 22 December 1943 and commissioned into Royal Navy service the same day as HMS Ruler, with the pennant number D72.

== Operational history ==
After completing sea trials HMS Ruler went to Burrard Dry Dock, in Vancouver, British Columbia, Canada, for refit to Royal Navy standards, as a transport carrier. Following a work-up period HMS Ruler went to Norfolk, Virginia, via the Panama Canal. It departed on 20 April 1944 with a number of Grumman F6F Hellcat and Vought F4U Corsair, transferring them to RNAS Speke in Liverpool, England, the aircraft disembarking on 6 May 1944. HMS Ruler returned to the United States, to New York, to fetch a batch of Grumman TBF Avenger and Grumman F6F Hellcat aircraft, embarking them between the 20 and 23 May 1944 and again transferring to RNAS Speke, on 11 June. HMS Ruler later made a third trip, fetching Grumman F6F Hellcat and Vought F4U Corsair from Norfolk, Virginia, between 20 and 29 October, this time arriving at Greenock to unload on 18 November.

HMS Ruler served in the North Atlantic during 1944, protecting the vital flow of men and war materiel from the United States to Great Britain and to fighting fronts on the European continent. In early 1945, she transferred to the Pacific Theatre where she supported a raid on Truk and the campaign to take Okinawa.

From March to August 1945 was part of the British Pacific Fleet attached to the 30th Aircraft Carrier Squadron. She entered Tokyo Bay on 31 August 1945 prior to the Surrender of Japan. On 13 September, the ship brought onboard some 450 ex Prisoners of War and sailed for Sydney in Australia, arriving 27 September where she was greeted by the Governor-General of Australia, Prince Henry, Duke of Gloucester.

After the war ended, Ruler returned to the United States at Norfolk, Virginia, on 28 January 1946. She was decommissioned from RN service on 29 January, and was accepted by the US Navy the same day. In excess of the Navy's needs, she was slated for disposal and struck from the Navy Register on 20 March 1946. The ship was sold on 13 May and scrapped within the year.

== Design and description ==
These ships were all larger and had a greater aircraft capacity than the preceding American built escort carriers. They were also all laid down as escort carriers and not converted merchant ships. The ships had a complement of 646 men and an overall length of 492 feet 3 inches (150.0 m), a beam of 69 feet 6 inches (21.2 m) and a draught of 25 ft 6 in (7.8 m). Propulsion was provided by two boilers which were connected to a steam turbine; it drove a shaft giving 9,350 brake horsepower (SHP), which could propel the ship at 16.5 knots (30.6 km/h; 19.0 mph).

Aircraft facilities were a small combined bridge/flight control on the starboard side, two aircraft lifts 43 feet (13.1 m) by 34 feet (10.4 m), one aircraft catapult and nine arrestor wires. Aircraft could be housed in the 260 feet (79.2 m) by 62 feet (18.9 m) hangar below the flight deck. Ruler's armament comprised: two 4"/50, 5"/38 or 5"/51 Dual Purpose guns in single mounts, sixteen 40 mm Bofors anti-aircraft guns in twin mounts and twenty 20 mm Oerlikon anti-aircraft cannons in single mounts. Each ship had a maximum aircraft capacity of twenty-four aircraft which could be a mixture of Grumman Martlets, Vought F4U Corsairs or Hawker Sea Hurricane fighter aircraft and Fairey Swordfish or Grumman Avenger anti-submarine torpedo bombers.
