= HMS Sea Devil =

Submarine of the Royal Navy

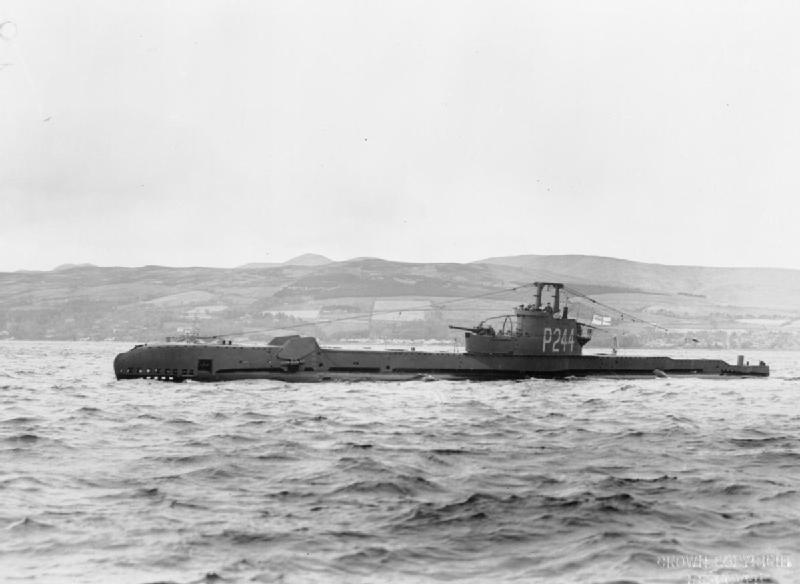

History

United Kingdom
- Name: HMS Sea Devil
- Builder: Scotts, Greenock
- Laid down: 5 May 1943
- Launched: 30 January 1945
- Commissioned: 12 May 1945
- Fate: Broken up in 1966
- Badge

General characteristics
- Class & type: S-class submarine
- Displacement: 814 long tons (827 t) surfaced; 990 long tons (1,010 t) submerged
- Length: 217 ft (66.1 m)
- Beam: 23 ft 9 in (7.2 m)
- Draught: 14 ft 8 in (4.5 m)
- Installed power: 1,900 bhp (1,400 kW) (diesel); 1,300 hp (970 kW) (electric)
- Propulsion: 2 × diesel engines; 2 × electric motors
- Speed: 15 kn (28 km/h; 17 mph) surfaced; 10 kn (19 km/h; 12 mph) submerged
- Range: 7,500 nmi (13,900 km; 8,600 mi) at 10 knots (19 km/h; 12 mph) surface; 120 nmi (220 km; 140 mi) at 3 knots (5.6 km/h; 3.5 mph) submerged
- Test depth: 350 feet (106.7 m)
- Complement: 48
- Armament: 6 × bow 21 in (533 mm) torpedo tubes; 1 × 4-inch (102 mm) deck gun

HMS Sea Devil was a S-class submarine of the third batch built for the Royal Navy during World War II. She survived the war and was sold for scrap in 1966.

== Design and description ==
The third batch was slightly enlarged and improved over the preceding second batch of the S-class. The submarines had a length of 217 feet (66.1 m) overall, a beam of 23 feet 9 inches (7.2 m) and a draught of 14 feet 8 inches (4.5 m). They displaced 814 long tons (827 t) on the surface and 990 long tons (1,010 t) submerged. The S-class submarines had a crew of 48 officers and ratings. Sea Devil had thicker hull plating, which increased her diving depth to 350 feet (106.7 m).

For surface running, the boats were powered by two 950-brake-horsepower (708 kW) diesel engines, each driving one propeller shaft. When submerged, each propeller was driven by a 650-horsepower (485 kW) electric motor. They could reach 15 knots (28 km/h; 17 mph) on the surface and 10 knots (19 km/h; 12 mph) underwater. Sea Devil could carry more fuel than most of the third batch boats and had a range of 7,500 nautical miles (13,900 km; 8,600 mi) on the surface at 10 knots (19 km/h; 12 mph) and 120 nmi (220 km; 140 mi) at 3 knots (5.6 km/h; 3.5 mph) submerged.

Sea Devil was armed with six 21-inch (533 mm) torpedo tubes in the bow. She carried six reload torpedoes for a total of a dozen torpedoes. Twelve mines could be carried in lieu of the internally stowed torpedoes. The boat was also equipped with a 4-inch (102 mm) deck gun.

== Construction and career ==
HMS Sea Devil was launched late in the Second World War, on 30 January 1945. Thus far she has been the only ship of the Royal Navy to bear the name Sea Devil. Her late commissioning meant that she was still on passage to the Far East when the war ended and therefore did not see any action. In 1953, she took part in the Fleet Review to celebrate the Coronation of Queen Elizabeth II.

In April 1954 Sea Devil deployed to the Mediterranean, and remained there for the rest of her active career. In 1955–1956 Sea Devil was used around Malta for tests of the Yellow Duckling infrared linescan system for detecting the wake of submerged submarines.

Sea Devil paid off for disposal at Portsmouth on 4 June 1962, the last of the S class in service with the Royal Navy, though other S-class boats remained in service with other navies. She was sold to the shipbreaker Metal Recoveries, and arrived at Newhaven on 15 December 1965.
