= HMS Striker (D12) =

American escort carrier transferred to the Royal Navy

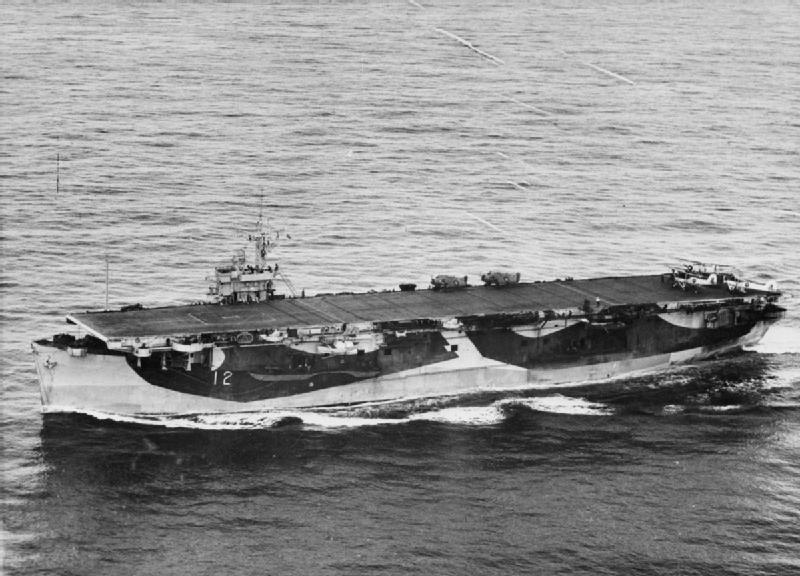
- HMS Striker c. 1945

History

United States
- Name: USS Prince William
- Builder: Western Pipe and Steel Company
- Laid down: 15 December 1941
- Launched: 7 May 1942
- Commissioned: 28 April 1943
- Fate: Transferred to Royal Navy

United Kingdom
- Name: HMS Striker
- Commissioned: 18 May 1943
- Decommissioned: 12 February 1946
- Stricken: 28 March 1946
- Fate: Scrapped in 1948

General characteristics
- Class & type: Attacker-class escort carrier
- Displacement: 14,400 tons
- Length: 491 ft 6 in (149.81 m)
- Beam: 105 ft (32 m)
- Draught: 26 ft (7.9 m)
- Propulsion: Steam turbines, 1 shaft, 8,500 shp (6,300 kW)
- Speed: 18 knots (33 km/h; 21 mph)
- Complement: 646 officers and enlisted
- Armament: 2 × 4"/50, 5"/38 or 5"/51 guns; 8 × twin 40 mm Bofors; 35 × single 20 mm Oerlikon
- Aircraft carried: 20

The name Prince William (CVE-19) (earlier AVG-19 then ACV-19) was assigned to MC hull 198, a converted C3 laid down by the Western Pipe and Steel Company, San Francisco, California, 15 December 1941.

Designated for transfer to the Royal Navy under the Lend-Lease Agreement, she was renamed and launched as HMS Striker (D12), 7 May 1942; redesignated ACV-19, 20 August 1942; delivered to the United States Navy 28 April 1943; and transferred to the Royal Navy 18 May 1943. Redesignated CVE-19, on the US Navy List, 15 July 1943. During November and December 1944, she was in transit between Scotland and Australia with HMS Fencer ferrying Mosquito aircraft for use in the Far East Theatre. From March to August 1945 the ship was part of the British Pacific Fleet attached to the 30th Aircraft Carrier Squadron as its flagship. She served with the Royal Navy throughout the remainder of World War II.

She was returned to the US Navy, at Norfolk, on 12 February 1946 and struck from the Naval Register on 28 March 1946. The ship was then sold to the Patapsco Steel Scrap Co., Bethlehem, Pennsylvania, on 5 June 1948 and scrapped.

== Design and description ==
There were eight Attacker-class escort carriers in service with the Royal Navy during the Second World War. They were built between 1941 and 1942 by Ingalls Shipbuilding and Western Pipe & Steel shipyards in the United States, both building four ships each.

The ships had a complement of 646 men and crew accommodation was different from the normal Royal Navy's arrangements. The separate messes no longer had to prepare their own food, as everything was cooked in the galley and served cafeteria style in a central dining area. They were also equipped with a modern laundry and a barbershop. The traditional hammocks were replaced by three-tier bunk beds, eighteen to a cabin, which were hinged and could be tied up to provide extra space when not in use.

The ships dimensions were; an overall length of 492.25 feet (150.04 m), a beam of 69.5 feet (21.2 m) and a height of 23.25 ft (7.09 m). They had a displacement of 11,420 long tons (11,603 t) at deep load. Propulsion was provided by four diesel engines connected to one shaft giving 8,500 brake horsepower (6,300 kW), which could propel the ship at 17 knots (31 km/h; 20 mph).

Aircraft facilities were a small combined bridge–flight control on the starboard side and above the 450-by-120-foot (137 by 37 m) flight deck, two aircraft lifts 42 by 34 feet (13 by 10 m), and nine arrestor wires. Aircraft could be housed in the 260-by-62-foot (79 by 19 m) hangar below the flight deck. Armament comprised two 4"/50, 5"/38 or 5"/51 in single mounts, eight 40 mm anti-aircraft gun in twin mounts and twenty-one 20 mm anti-aircraft cannons in single or twin mounts. They had the capacity for up to eighteen aircraft which could be a mixture of Grumman Martlet, Hawker Sea Hurricane, Vought F4U Corsair fighter aircraft and Fairey Swordfish or Grumman Avenger anti-submarine aircraft.

== Bibliography ==
- Cocker, Maurice (2008). Aircraft-Carrying Ships of the Royal Navy. Stroud, Gloucestershire: The History Press. ISBN 978-0-7524-4633-2.
- Poolman, Kenneth (1972). Escort Carrier 1941–1945. London: Ian Allan. ISBN 0-7110-0273-8.
