= RFA Prince Salvor =

King Salvor class salvage vessel of the Royal Fleet Auxiliary

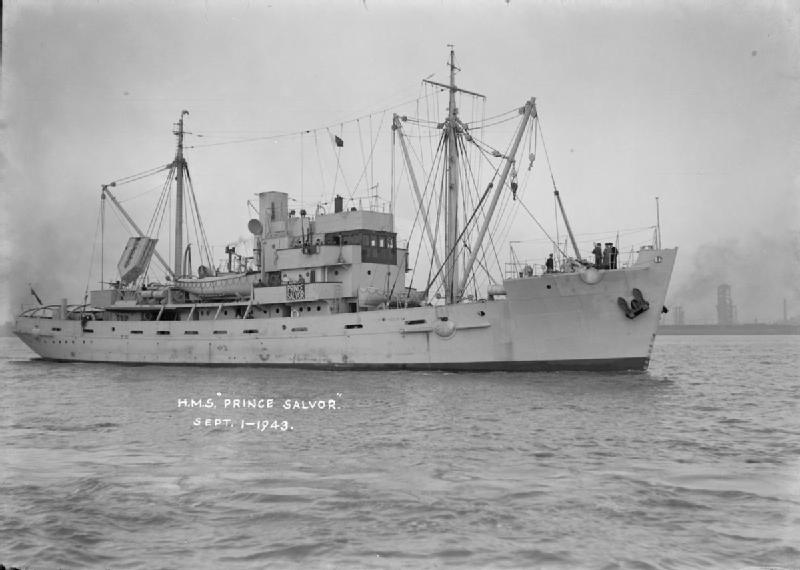

History

United Kingdom
- Name: Prince Salvor
- Ordered: 25 December 1941
- Builder: Goole Shipbuilding & Repair Co., Goole
- Yard number: 390
- Laid down: 8 July 1942
- Launched: 8 March 1943
- Commissioned: 8 September 1943
- Decommissioned: 1966
- Fate: Scrapped at Pomphlett in October 1967

General characteristics
- Class & type: King Salvor-class salvage vessel
- Type: Salvage vessel
- Displacement: 1,780 long tons (1,809 t) full load
- Length: 217 ft 11 in (66.42 m)
- Beam: 37 ft 11 in (11.56 m)
- Draught: 15 ft 7.25 in (4.8 m)
- Propulsion: 2 × 3-cylinder triple expansion steam engines
- Speed: 12 knots (14 mph; 22 km/h)
- Complement: 72
- Armament: 4 × 20 mm AA guns (4×1)

RFA Prince Salvor (A292) was a salvage vessel of the Royal Fleet Auxiliary.
