= HMS Ulysses (R69) =

U-class destroyer converted to Type 15 frigate of the Royal Navy

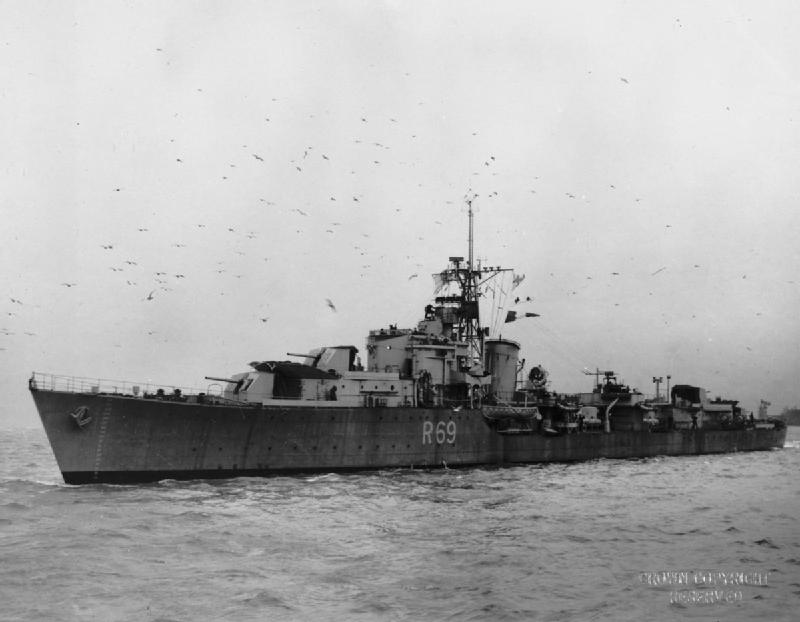
- Ulysses in January 1944

History

United Kingdom
- Name: HMS Ulysses
- Builder: Cammell Laird
- Laid down: 14 March 1942
- Launched: 22 April 1943
- Commissioned: 23 December 1943
- Identification: Pennant number: R69
- Fate: Scrapped

General characteristics
- Class & type: U-class destroyer

HMS Ulysses was a U-class destroyer of the British Royal Navy that saw service during World War II. She was later converted into a Type 15 fast anti-submarine frigate, with the new pennant number F17.

== Service history ==
=== Second World War service ===
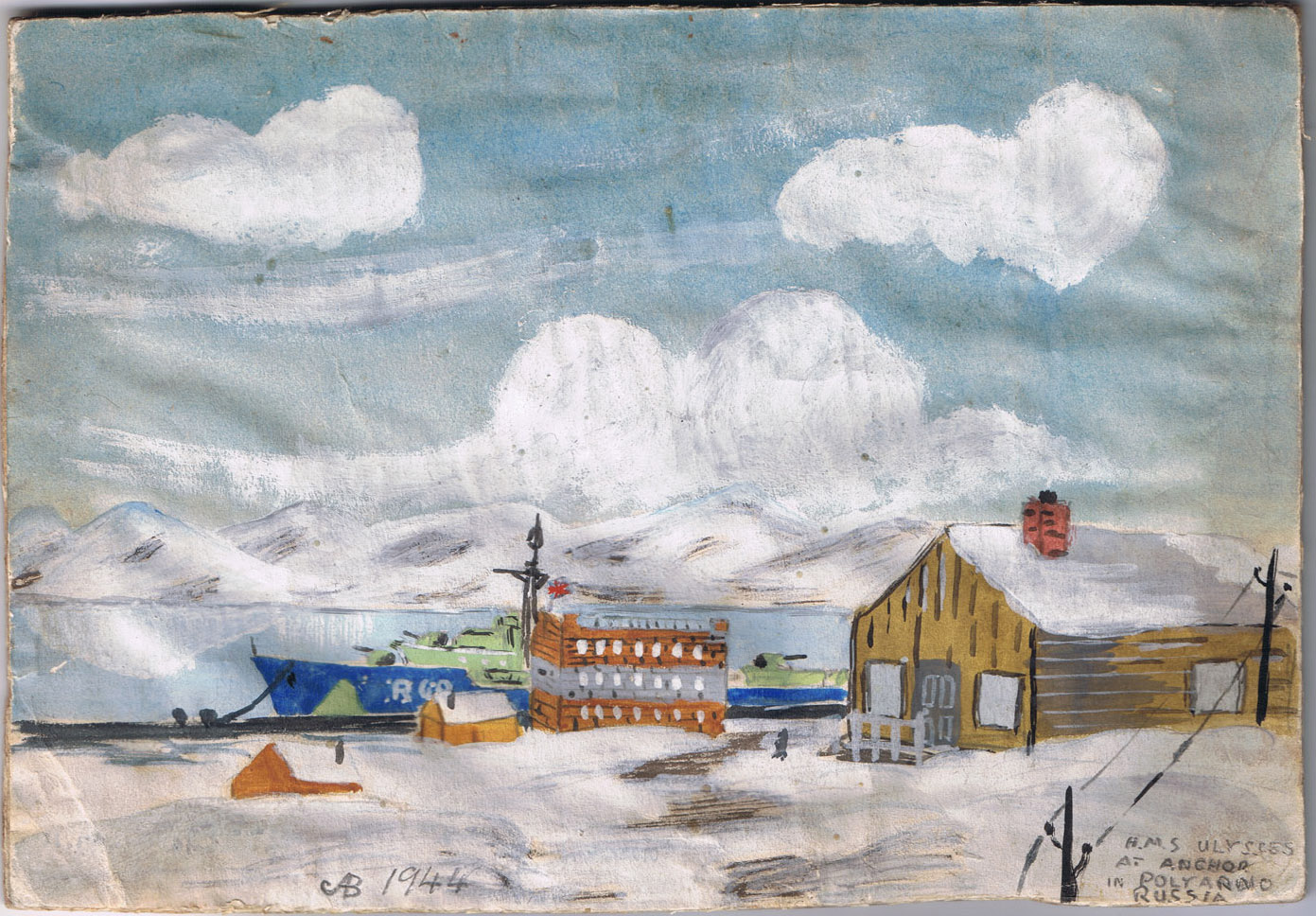
HMS Ulysses by Arnold Barlow – Officers Cook. "Polyarno" (Polyarny), Russia, May 1944.

On commissioning Ulysses was allocated to the 25th Destroyer Flotilla and worked as part of the Home Fleet; this included work on the Arctic convoys. In June 1944 she assisted with the invasion of Normandy, providing naval gunfire support. In late 1944 and early 1945 she was refitted for service in the Far East and in March 1945 left the UK to join the British Pacific Fleet. She returned to the UK in 1946 and was soon placed in reserve.

=== Postwar service ===
Between 1946 and 1951 Ulysses was held in reserve at Devonport. In December 1951 she was commissioned for the Plymouth local flotilla. In 1953 she was again reduced to the reserve at Devonport. Between 1954 and 1955 she was converted to a Type 15 anti-submarine frigate, at Devonport Dockyard.

On 18 October 1955 she re-commissioned and formed part of the 6th Frigate Squadron, as part Mediterranean and Home Fleet. She also formed part of the Royal Navy's force used during the Suez Operation. In 1958 she was part of Operation Grapple, witnessing nuclear tests off Christmas Island. On 27 October 1958 she collided with sister ship Undine off Ushant. In 1960 she became a training ship as part of the Plymouth local squadron and in December 1960 was placed into the Devonport reserve.

=== Decommissioning and disposal ===
Ulysses was decommissioned in 1963 and in 1966 was still listed as in reserve. Used as accommodation and office space for standing by build of HMS Danae in 1967, she was scrapped at Plymouth in 1970.

== Publications ==
- Colledge, J. J.; Warlow, Ben (2006) [1969]. Ships of the Royal Navy: The Complete Record of All Fighting Ships of the Royal Navy from the 15th Century to the Present (3rd Rev ed.). London: Chatham Publishing. ISBN 978-1-86176-281-8. OCLC 67375475.
- Marriott, Leo (1994). Royal Navy Destroyers since 1945. Ian Allan. ISBN 0-7110-1817-0.
- Raven, Alan; Roberts, John (1978). War Built Destroyers O to Z Classes. London: Bivouac Books. ISBN 0-85680-010-4.
- Richardson, Ian (August 2021). Osborne, Richard (ed.). "Type 15 Frigates, Part 2: Ship Histories". Warships: Marine News Supplement. 75 (8): 381–391. ISSN 0966-6958.
- Whitley, M. J. (1988). Destroyers of World War 2. Annapolis, Maryland: Naval Institute Press. ISBN 0-87021-326-1.
