= List of Eastern Fleet ships =

The Eastern Fleet was a World War II formation of the British Royal Navy. It was formed from the ships and installations of the East Indies Station and the China Station (which are included in this list), with headquarters at Singapore, moving between Trincomalee and Kilindini after the Japanese advances in south east Asia made Singapore untenable as a naval base. See main article for details.

The following lists the warships and support ships of the Fleet, with dates served, fate and nationality.

== Battleships ==
Ship	Nationality	Date joined	Date left	Fate/ next assignment
Howe	UK	August 9,1944; September 1945	November 1944; January 1946	Joined British Pacific Fleet; Joined Home Fleet
Nelson	UK	July 1945	September 1945	Joined Home Fleet
Prince of Wales	UK	December 1941	10 December 1941	Sunk by air attack
Queen Elizabeth	UK	January 1944	July 1945	Reserve
Ramillies	UK	February 1942 October 1943	June 1942 December 1943	Damaged at Diego Suarez, repaired at Durban and Plymouth, then Home Fleet; Joined Home Fleet
Resolution	UK	March 1942	September 1943	Reserve
Revenge	UK	August 1941	September 1943	Reserve
Richelieu	France	April 1944; March 1945	October 1944; May 1945	Toulon
Royal Sovereign	UK	October 1941; October 1943	January 1943; December 1943	Refit in USA; Reserve and transfer to USSR
Valiant	UK	August 1942; January 1944	January 1943; August 8, 1944	Joined Mediterranean Fleet; Repairs following damage in drydock collapse August 8, 1944 at Trincomalee
Warspite	UK	March 1942	March 1943	Joined Mediterranean Fleet

== Battlecruisers ==
Ship	Nationality	Date joined	Date left	Fate/ next assignment
Renown	UK	January 1944	March 1945	Joined Home Fleet
Repulse	UK	December 1941	10-December 1941	Sunk by air attack

== Fleet aircraft carriers ==
Ship	Nationality	Date joined	Date left	Fate/ next assignment
Eagle	UK	<September 1939; March 1941	May 1940; May 1941	Mediterranean Fleet; South Atlantic and Africa Station
Formidable	UK	March 1942	August 1942	Operation Torch
Hermes	UK	<March 1942	9 April 1942	Sunk by Japanese air attack off Ceylon (Sri Lanka)
Illustrious	UK	May 1942; January 1944	January 1943; November 1944	Joined Mediterranean Fleet; Joined British Pacific Fleet
Indefatigable	UK	November 1944	November 1944	Joined British Pacific Fleet
Indomitable	UK	January 1942; July 1944	July 1942; November 1944	Joined Mediterranean Fleet; Joined British Pacific Fleet
Saratoga	US	April 1944	May 1944	USA for refit
Unicorn	UK	January 1944	December 1944	Joined British Pacific Fleet. Usually used as an aircraft maintenance ship
Victorious	UK	July 1944	November 1944	Joined British Pacific Fleet

== Escort aircraft carriers ==
Ship	Nationality	Date joined	Date left	Fate/ next assignment
Activity	UK	April 1945	September 1945	to UK into reserve
Ameer	UK	June 1944	October 1945	Returned to USN
Atheling	UK	May 1944	December 1944	Joined USN for operations SW Pacific
Attacker	UK	April 1945	September 1945	Returned to USN
Battler	UK	November 1943	December 1944	Joined Home Fleet
Begum	UK	April 1944; June 1945	January 1945; October 1945	Refit on Clyde; Returned to USN
Emperor	UK	March 1945	November 1945	Returned to USN
Empress	UK	February 1945	November 1945	Returned to UK for pay-off, then to USN
Hunter	UK	March 1945	October 1945	Returned to USN
Khedive	UK	February 1945	September 1945	Returned to UK for pay-off, then to USN
Pursuer	UK	August 1945	November 1945	Returned to UK for pay-off, then to USN
Searcher	UK	August 1945	August 1945	Returned to UK for pay-off, then to USN
Shah	UK	April 1944	September 1945	Returned to UK for pay-off, then to USN
Stalker	UK	March 1945	October 1945	Returned to UK for pay-off, then to USN
Trouncer	UK	October 1945	October 1945	Returned to UK for pay-off, then to USN
Trumpeter	UK	July 1945	January 1946	Returned to UK for pay-off, then to USN

== Heavy cruisers ==
Ship	Nationality	Date joined	Date left	Fate/ next assignment
Berwick	UK	July 1927	1936	Joined Mediterranean Fleet
Canberra	Australia	<May 1940	<December 1941	US Pacific Fleet (Task Force 17)
Cornwall	UK	December 1927 <September 1939; April 1941	<1938; December 1939; 5 April 1942	UK for Refit; South Atlantic and Africa Station; Sunk by Japanese air attack
Cumberland	UK	December 1927 <1938; March 1944	1935; 1938; November 1945	UK for reconstruction 2nd Cruiser Squadron; Joined Home Fleet
Devonshire	UK	December 1941; April 1942	January 1942; March 1943	Refit at Norfolk Naval Shipyard; Refit, then Home Fleet
Dorsetshire	UK	1937; November 1940; March 1942	October 1939; December 1940; 5 April 1942	South Atlantic and Africa Station; Atlantic; Sunk by Japanese air attack
Effingham	UK	1925	<September 1932	Joined Home Fleet
Frobisher	UK	1926; March 1942	1926; March 1944	Joined Mediterranean Fleet; Joined Home Fleet
Hawkins	UK	1919; December 1929; September 1932 < February 1941; May 1942	November 1928; May 1930; April 1935 > December 1941; February 1944	Refit in UK; Reserve; Reserve; Refit at Portsmouth; Joined Home Fleet for D-day
Kent	UK	June 1928; 1938	1937; August 1940	Reconstruction; Joined Mediterranean Fleet
London	UK	March 1944	June 1949	Paid off
Suffolk	UK	February 1928; April 1943	<October 1939 <March 1948	Joined Home Fleet; Joined Home Fleet
Sussex	UK	>February 1943 July 1945	April 1944 >Sept 1945	to UK for refit April 1944 Rejoined Eastern Fleet July 1945

== Light cruisers ==
Ship	Nationality	Date joined	Date left	Fate/ next assignment
Achilles	New Zealand	June 1944	November 1944	Joined British Pacific Fleet
Birmingham	UK	January 1938	September 1939	Refit at Malta, then Home Fleet
Cairo	UK	1920	1927	America and West Indies Station
Caledon	UK	August 1940	September 1942	Joined Home Fleet
Capetown	UK	July 1934 <August 1940; 19 June 1942	August 1938 <April 1941 > October 1942	UK, Refit Home Fleet
Caradoc	UK	December 1926; July 1930 > February 1942; 1944	<September 1927 <October 1934; June 1943 <April 1946	UK, Refit; Reserve; South Africa Station; UK, scrapped
Carlisle	UK	March 1919 <August 1940	1928 <March 1941	Refit; Mediterranean Fleet
Cardiff	UK	July 1938	April 1939	Reserve
Ceres	UK	April 1940	October 1943	Mediterranean Fleet
Ceylon	UK	November 1943	November 1944	Joined British Pacific Fleet
Colombo	UK	June 1919; July 1932 <August 1940	1926; 1935; June 1942	America and West Indies Station; Reserve; UK for conversion
Danae	UK	August 1936; February 1942; July 1943	January 1938; July 1942; December 1943	Joined Home Fleet; Modernisation in UK; Joined Home Fleet
Dauntless	UK	December 1939; August 1942	February 1942; February 1945	Refit at Portsmouth; Reserve
Delhi	UK	1926	1928	
Despatch	UK	June 1922	1927	America and West Indies Station
Diomede	UK; New Zealand	1922; 1935	1925; March 1936	New Zealand Squadron; Reverted to Royal Navy, placed in Reserve
Dragon	UK	October 1926; January 1941	December 1928; November 1942	UK, Refit; Home Fleet
Durban	UK	<March 1940 > June 1943	>August 1942; November 1943	Repairs at New York, Refit Portsmouth; UK, Reserve
Emerald	UK	January 1926; August 1934 <April 1941; April 1943	July 1933; September 1937; August 1942 <June 1944	Refit; Reserve; Refit; Joined Home Fleet
Enterprise	UK	April 1926; January 1936; January 1941	<July 1934; December 1937; December 1942	Reserve; Joined Home Fleet; Refit at Clyde
Gambia	UK	February 1942	November 1944	Joined British Pacific Fleet
Gloucester	UK	<September 1939	<May 1941	
Hobart	Australia	<April 1940	>June 1941	Pacific
Kenya	UK	January 1944	>February 1945	
Leander	New Zealand	<1931	>1945	Damaged in the Battle of Kolombangara
Liverpool	UK	<September 1939	>January 1940	
Manchester	UK	<September 1939	<May 1940	
Mauritius	UK	February 1942	April 1943	Joined Mediterranean Fleet
Newcastle	UK	April 1942; May 1943	May 1942; March 1945	Joined Mediterranean Fleet; Joined British Pacific Fleet
Nigeria	UK	February 1944	December 1945	Refit
Swiftsure	UK	<November 1944	November 1944	Joined British Pacific Fleet
Tromp	Netherlands	January 1944 February 1945	September 1944 August 1945	Refit at Sydney Australia Joined British Pacific Fleet

== Anti-aircraft cruisers ==
Ship	Nationality	Date joined	Date left	Fate/ next assignment
Argonaut	UK	November 1944	November 1944	Joined British Pacific Fleet
Black Prince	UK	November 1944	November 1944	Joined British Pacific Fleet
Euryalus	UK	January 1945	January 1945	Joined British Pacific Fleet
Jacob van Heemskerck	Netherlands	March 1942	December 1943	
Phoebe	UK	June 1944	September 1945	
Royalist	UK	March 1945	>September 1945	

== Armed merchant cruisers ==
Ship	Nationality	Date joined	Date left	Fate/ next assignment
Arawa	UK	September 1939	November 1940	South Atlantic Station
Canton	UK	September 1942	April 1944	Converted to troopship
Corfu	UK	March 1942	August 1942	South Atlantic Station
Hector	UK	March 1942	April 42	Sunk by air attack in Colombo harbour
Ranchi	UK	March 1942	January 1943	Used as troopship
Westralia	Australia		1943	Converted to landing ship infantry

== Destroyers ==
Ship	Nationality	Date joined	Date left	Fate/ next assignment
Active	UK	<1942	<May 1942	
Anthony	UK	<May 1942	<February 1944	Joined Mediterranean Fleet
Arrow	UK	<June 1942	<June 1943	
Cummings	US	April 1944	May 1944	Pacific
Dainty	UK	<September 1939	September 1939	Joined Home Fleet
Daring	UK	<September 1939	September 1939	Joined Home Fleet
Decoy	UK	<September 1939	<June 1940	
Defender	UK	<September 1939	<June 1940	
Delight	UK	<September 1939	<June 1940	
Diamond	UK	<September 1939	<April 1941	
Diana	UK	<September 1939	<February 1940	
Duchess	UK	<September 1939	<December 1939	
Duncan	UK	January 1935 > March 1941	September 1939; 1942	Repairs, then joined Home Fleet; Joined Home Fleet
Dunlap	US	April 1944	May 1944	Pacific
Encounter	UK		1 March 1942	Sunk
Eskimo	UK	<May 1945		
Express	UK	November 1941	February 1943	Refit in UK
Fanning	US	April 1944	May 1944	Pacific
Fortune	UK	March 1942; September 1942	April 1942; November 1942	Dry dock at Simonstown, South Africa
Foxhound	UK	April 1942	May 1943	to UK for conversion to long-range ASW escort
Grenville	UK	December 1944	February 1945	Joined British Pacific Fleet
Griffin	UK	April 1942 July 1942	May 1942 October 1942	to Mediterranean Fleet to UK for conversion to long-range ASW escort
Hotspur	UK	September 1942; September 1943	January 1943; December 1943	Dry dock at Simonstown, South Africa; Returned to Home Fleet
Isaac Sweers	Netherlands	April 1942	May 1942	Refit at Southampton
Isis	UK	<June 1941		
Inconstant	UK	April 1942	May 1942	to Mediterranean Fleet
Javelin	UK	April 1942	May 1942	to Mediterranean Fleet
Kempenfelt	UK	November 1944		
Laforey	UK	<May 1942	July 1942	to Mediterranean Fleet
Lightning	UK	<May 1942	July 1942	to Mediterranean Fleet
Lookout	UK	<May 1942	July 1942	to Mediterranean Fleet
Napier	Australia	February 1942	February 1945	
Nepal	Australia	July 1942	March 1945	Joined British Pacific Fleet
Nestor	Australia	January 1942	June 1942	Sunk in Mediterranean, during Operation Vigorous
Nizam	Australia	January 1942	November 1944	
Norman	Australia	January 1942	February 1945	Joined British Pacific Fleet
Nubian	UK	<May 1945		
Pakenham	UK	April 1942	May 1942	to Mediterranean Fleet
Paladin	UK	March 1942 February 1944	May 1942 >May 1945	to Mediterranean Fleet
Panther	UK	<April 1942	May 1942	to UK for refit/Home Fleet duty
Pathfinder	UK	February 1944	February 1945	Reserve
Penn	UK	February 1944	September 1944	to UK for refit
Petard	UK	February 1944	August 1944	to UK for refit
Quadrant	UK	March 1944	November 1944	Joined British Pacific Fleet
Quality	UK	March 1944	November 1944	Joined British Pacific Fleet
Queenborough	UK	March 1944	November 1944	Joined British Pacific Fleet
Quiberon	Australia	March 1943	November 1944	Joined British Pacific Fleet
Quickmatch	Australia	May 1943	October 1944	
Quilliam	UK	March 1944	November 1944	Joined British Pacific Fleet
Racehorse	UK	January 1944		
Raider	UK	April 1944	>January 1945	
Rapid	UK	March 1944	>January 1945	
Redoubt	UK	March 1944		
Relentless	UK	<September 1943	>February 1944	
Rocket	UK	February 1944		
Roebuck	UK	September 1943	>May 1945	
Rotherham	UK	<December 1943		
Saumarez	UK	March 1945	June 1945	to Simonstown for repair
Scout	UK	<September 1939	<March 1946	
Tartar	UK	Feb 1945	Nov 1945?	
Tenedos	UK	<September 1939	April 1942	Sunk by air attack in Colombo harbour
Thanet	UK	<September 1939	27 January 1942	Sunk by Japanese destroyers off east coast of Malaya
Thracian	UK	<September 1939	December 1941	Run aground at Hong Kong; salvaged by the IJN, repaired and recommissioned on 25 November 1942 as Patrol Vessel No.101
Tjerk Hiddes	Netherlands	Feb 1944	October 1944	to UK for convoy defence
Le Triomphant	France	May 1945		
Undaunted	UK	December 1944	February 1945	Joined British Pacific Fleet
Undine	UK	December 1944	February 1945	Joined British Pacific Fleet
Ursa	UK	December 1944	February 1945	Joined British Pacific Fleet
Vampire	Australia	February 1942	9 April 1942	Sunk by Japanese air attack off Ceylon (Sri Lanka)
Van Galen	Netherlands	June 1942	November 1944	to UK for convoy defence
Vendetta	Australia		August 1945	Joined British Pacific Fleet
Venus	UK	March 1945	>August 1945	
Verulam	UK	March 1945	>September 1945	
Vigilant	UK	February 1945	>August 1945	
Virago	UK	January 1945	>September 1945	
Volage	UK	February 1945	>September 1945	
Wager	UK	September 1944	January 1945	Joined British Pacific Fleet
Wakeful	UK	September 1944	November 1944	Joined British Pacific Fleet
Wessex	UK	September 1944	November 1944	Joined British Pacific Fleet
Whelp	UK	October 1944	January 1945	Joined British Pacific Fleet

== Frigates ==
Ship	Nationality	Date joined	Date left	Fate/ next assignment
Avon	UK	March 1944	December 1944	to British Pacific Fleet
Bann	UK	<November 1943	December 1945	transferred to Royal Indian Navy; renamed Tir
Derg	UK	<November 1943		
Deveron	UK	October 1944	late 1945	Transferred to Royal Indian Navy
Findhorn	UK	<May 1944		Joined British Pacific Fleet
Inver	UK	>July 1943		
Jed	UK	November 1944		
Kale	UK	<December 1943		
Lossie	UK	June 1944		
Nadder	UK	<August 1944		
Parrett	UK	<August 1944		
Plym	UK	November 1943		
Taff	UK	<August 1944		
Tay	UK	September 1943		
Teviot	UK	November 1944	June 1945	Transferred to the South African Navy June 1945
Trent	UK	September 1943	April 1946	Transferred to the Royal Indian Navy April 1946

== Corvettes ==
Ship	Nationality	Date joined	Date left	Fate/ next assignment
Auricula	UK	April 1942	May 1942	Mined and sunk off Diego Suarez
Fritillary	UK	June 1942	March 1944	
Genista	UK	<May 1942	>February 1943	
Hollyhock	UK		9 April 1942	Sunk by Japanese air attack off Ceylon (Sri Lanka)
Honesty	UK	November 1943		
Integrity	UK	<December 1943		
Jasmine	UK	<December 1943		
Rosebay	UK	December 1943	March 1946	returned to USN
Thyme	UK	<August 1943		
Tulip	UK	<December 1943		

== Minesweepers ==
Ship	Nationality	Date joined	Date left	Fate/ next assignment
Aberdare	UK	<September 1939	<March 1947	
Abingdon	UK	<September 1939	<April 1942	
Bagshot	UK	<September 1939	<April 1945	
Bathurst	Australia	June 1941	August 1944	Australia
Bengal	British India	<November 1942		
Bihar	British India	>Feb 1944		
Bombay	British India	>September 1942		
Burnie	Australia	September 1942	December 1944	Joined British Pacific Fleet
Cairns	Australia	November 1942	January 1945	Joined British Pacific Fleet
Cessnock	Australia	December 1942	January 1945	Joined British Pacific Fleet
Chameleon	UK	April 1945		
Derby	UK	<September 1939	<April 1941	
Fareham	UK	<September 1939	<February 1941	
Gawler	Australia	January 1943 October 1943	April 1943 January 1945	to Mediterranean refit in Adelaide
Geraldton	Australia	August 1942	January 1945	Joined British Pacific Fleet
Harrow	UK	<September 1939	<1947	
Huntley	UK	<September 1939	<January 1941	
Ipswich	Australia	November 1942	January 1945	Joined British Pacific Fleet
Launceston	Australia	September 1942	September 1944	refit at Fremantle
Lismore	Australia	December 1941	December 1944	Joined British Pacific Fleet
Madras	British India	1942		
Maryborough	Australia	November 1942	December 1944	
Orissa	British India	1943	<February 1944	
Pickle	UK	April 1945		
Pincher	UK	April 1945		
Plucky	UK	April 1945		
Punjab	British India	March 1942	>July 1945	
Recruit	UK	April 1945		
Rifleman	UK	April 1945		
Squirrel	UK	July 1945	24 July 1945	Mined and sunk off Phuket
Stoke	UK	<September 1939	<May 1941	
Tamworth	Australia	February 1943	January 1945	Joined British Pacific Fleet
Toowoomba	Australia	December 1942	December 1944	
Vestal	UK	1945	26 July 1945	Scuttled after damage from kamikaze
Widnes	UK	<September 1939	<May 1941	
Wollongong	Australia	September 1942	February 1945	

== Monitors ==
Ship	Nationality	Date joined	Date left	Fate/ next assignment
Erebus	UK	<April 1942	<July 1943	
Terror	UK	<September 1939	<April 1940	

== Oilers ==
Ship	Nationality	Date joined	Date left	Fate/ next assignment
RFA Echodale	UK	<January 1945	>May 1945	
RFA Olwen	UK	1942	1946	
RFA Wave King	UK			

== Sloops ==
Ship	Nationality	Date joined	Date left	Fate/ next assignment
Banff	UK	November 1943		
Bideford	UK	June 1939	>September 1939	
Cauvery	British India	April 1944	>April 1945	
Clive	British India	<September 1939	>September 1939	
Cornwallis	British India	<September 1939	>September 1939	
Deptford	UK	<September 1939	September 1939	Joined Mediterranean Fleet
Egret	UK	<September 1939	<August 1943	
Falmouth	UK	<September 1939 March 1944	December 1943 March 1945	refit at Simonstown refit at Simonstown
Fishguard	UK	February 1944		
Flamingo	UK	January 1944	April 1945	to UK for refit
Fleetwood	UK	<September 1939	September 1939	Joined Mediterranean Fleet
Folkestone	UK	<September 1939	<October 1940	
Fowey	UK	<September 1939	September 1939	Joined Mediterranean Fleet
Godavari	British India	April 1944	>April 1945	
Gorleston	UK	August 1944		
Grimsby	UK	<September 1939	September 1939	Joined Mediterranean Fleet
Hindustan	British India	<September 1939	>April 1945	
Indus	British India	April 1942	6 April 1942	Sunk off Akyab
Jumna	British India	<February 1944	>January 1945	
Kistna	British India	February 1944	>April 1945	
Landguard	UK	September 1943		
Lawrence	British India	<September 1939	>September 1939	
Lowestoft	UK	<September 1939	>September 1939	
Lulworth	UK	November 1943		
Narbada	British India	September 1943	>March 1945	
Redpole	UK	November 1944	February 1945 to BPF	
Rochester	UK	<September 1939	>September 1939	
Sandwich	UK	<September 1939	<June 1940	
Sennen	UK	October 1943		
Shoreham	UK	1932; September 1943	February 1943; July 1946	Joined Mediterranean Fleet; Scrapped 1946
Soemba	Netherlands	April 1942	early 1943	Joined Mediterranean Fleet
Sutlej	British India	December 1943	>April 1945	
Totland	UK	July 1944		
Warrego	Australia			

== Submarines ==
Ship	Nationality	Date joined	Date left	Fate/ next assignment
Clyde	UK	May 1944	May 1945	to Mombasa for repair, then to UK August 1945 into reserve
Grampus	UK	<September 1939	<June 1940	Transferred to Mediterranean Fleet
K XIV	Netherlands	<May 1940	April 1946	Decommissioned
K XV	Netherlands	<May 1940	January 1946	at Fremantle for repair
O 19	Netherlands	September 1939	July 1945	scuttled
Odin	UK	<September 1939	<June 1940	
Olympus	UK	<September 1939	<May 1942	
Otus	UK	<September 1939	<August 1941	
Pandora	UK	<September 1939	<July 1940	
Parthian	UK	<September 1939	May 1940	Transferred to Mediterranean Fleet
Perseus	UK	<September 1939	August 1940	Transferred to Mediterranean Fleet
Phoenix	UK	<September 1939	<July 1940	
Porpoise	UK	June 1944	19 January 1945	Sunk by Japanese aircraft, Malacca Strait
Proteus	UK	<September 1939	<November 1941	
Rainbow	UK	<September 1939	<September 1940	
Regent	UK	<September 1939	<October 1940	
Regulus	UK	<September 1939	<November 1940	
Rorqual	UK	<September 1939	<June 1940	
Rover	UK	<September 1939	<January 1941	
Scythian	UK	February 1945	September 1945	to UK into reserve
Seal	UK	September 1939	October 1939	Joined Home Fleet
Severn	UK	>April 1944		
Shakespeare	UK	>December 1944	3 January 1945	Damaged by gunfire and air attack in the Nankauri Strait, Andaman Islands; written off as a constructive total loss
Shalimar	UK	September 1944	September 1945	to UK into reserve
Sleuth	UK	March 1945	September 1945	to UK into reserve
Solent	UK	February 1945	September 1945	to UK into reserve
Spark	UK	<December 1944	>July 1945	
Spirit	UK	June 1944	April 1945	to UK for refit
Statesman	UK	<August 1944	>August 1945	
Stoic	UK	February 1944	January 1945	to UK for refit
Stonehenge	UK	<February 1944	March 1944	Overdue, assumed lost
Storm	UK	February 1944	February 1945	to UK for refit
Stratagem	UK	<August 1944	22 November 1944	Damaged by depth charges and scuttled in the Malacca Straits
Stygian	UK	<September 1944	>July 1945	
Subtle	UK	<December 1944	>May 1945	
Tactician	UK	October 43	June 1944	to UK for refit
Tally-Ho	UK	October 43	December 1944	to UK for refit
Tantalus	UK	<April 1944	March 1945	to UK for refit
Tantivy	UK	late 1943	March 1945	to UK for refit
Taurus	UK	November 1943 June 1945	May 1944	to UK for refit
Telemachus	UK	June 1944	May 1945	to UK for refit
Templar	UK	October 43	August 1944	to UK for refit
Terrapin	UK	<August 1944	May 1945	Damaged by depth charges west of Batavia, Java in the Java Sea; declared a constructive total loss
Thorough	UK	<November 1944	October 1945	to UK for refit
Thule	UK	October 1944	November 1945	to UK for refit
Torbay	UK	January 1945	September 1945	to UK for refit
Tradewind	UK	April 1944	June 1945	to UK for refit
Trenchant	UK	July 1944	September 1945	to UK for refit
Trespasser	UK	October 1943	April 1944	to UK for refit
Truant	UK	January 1942	September 1942	to UK for refit
Truculent	UK	January 1944	July 1944	to UK for refit
Tudor	UK	July 1944	August 1945	to UK for refit
Zwaardvisch	Netherlands	July 1944	June 1945	to UK for refit

== Gunboats ==
Ship	Nationality	Date joined	Date left	Fate/ next assignment
Aphis	UK	1927	<June 1942	Transferred to Mediterranean Fleet
Cicala	UK	<September 1939	21 December 1941	Bombed and sunk (probably scuttled) near Hong Kong
Cockchafer	UK	<September 1926	<March 1943	Transferred to Mediterranean Fleet
Cricket	UK	<1939	November 1940	Transferred to Mediterranean Fleet
Dragonfly	UK	June 1939	14 February 1942	Sunk in Riau Archipelago
Falcon	UK	<September 1939	February 1942	Transferred to China; renamed Luan Huan
Gannet	UK	<September 1939	February 1942	Transferred to China; renamed Ying Shan ("British Mountain")
Gnat	UK	<September 1939	>December 1941	Transferred to Mediterranean Fleet
Grasshopper	UK	<September 1939	14 February 1942	Beached after dive bombers hit her (wreck still there today) in Riau Archipelago
Ladybird	UK	1927	>December 1941	Transferred to Mediterranean Fleet
Mantis	UK	1927	January 1940	Scrapped Shanghai
Moth	UK	<September 1939	12 December 1941	Sunk and refloated by Japanese; renamed Suma; mined and sunk 19 March 1945 near Nanking
Peterel	UK	<September 1939	8 December 1941	Sunk at Shanghai
Robin	UK	<September 1939	25 December 1941	Scuttled near Hong Kong
Sandpiper	UK	1933	February 1942	Transferred to China; renamed Ying Hao ("British Hero")
Scarab	UK	<September 1926	>December 1941	Transferred to Mediterranean Fleet
Scorpion	UK	1937	February 1942	Sunk near Singapore
Seamew	UK	1927	18 August 1947	Scrapped at Basra
Smilax	UK	>June 1943	October 1946	returned to USA
Tarantula	UK	<September 1939	1 May 1946	Sunk during target practice
Tern	UK	<September 1939	19 December 1941	Scuttled at Deep Water Bay

== Torpedo boats ==
Ship	Nationality	Date joined	Date left	Fate/ next assignment
MTB.7	UK	<September 1939	December 1941	Scuttled in Hong Kong Harbour
MTB.8	UK	<September 1939	December 1941	Scuttled in Hong Kong Harbour
MTB.9	UK	<September 1939	December 1941	Scuttled in Hong Kong Harbour
MTB.10	UK	<September 1939	December 1941	Scuttled in Hong Kong Harbour
MTB.11	UK	<September 1939	December 1941	Scuttled in Hong Kong Harbour
MTB.12	UK	<September 1939	December 1941	Scuttled in Hong Kong Harbour

== Miscellaneous ==
Ship	Type	Nationality	Date joined	Date left	Fate/ next assignment
Adamant	Submarine depot ship	UK	April 1943	April 1945	to British Pacific Fleet
Albatross	Seaplane tender	UK	May 1942	July 1943	UK for paying off & conversion to repair ship
Ausonia	Heavy Repair Ship	UK	>June 1944	June 1946	into reserve
Barlane	Boom defence vessel	UK			
Barlight	Boom defence vessel	UK		19 December 1941	Scuttled Hong Kong to prevent capture by the Japanese: subsequently raised and commissioned on 20 September 1942 into the IJN as Netlayer 101. Netlayer 101 sunk 15 June 1944 off Saipan.
Barricade	Boom defence vessel	UK			
Barrier	Boom defence vessel	UK			
Forth	Submarine depot ship	UK			
Maidstone	Submarine depot ship	UK	March 1944	April 1945	then to British Pacific Fleet
Medway	Submarine depot ship	UK	<September 1939	April 1940	Joined Mediterranean Fleet
Resource	Fleet repair ship	UK	1944	>August 1945	
St Breock	Rescue tug	UK		4 February 1942	Bombed & sunk off Sumatra
St Just	Rescue tug	UK			
Willem van der Zaan	Minelayer/Escort ship	Netherlands	March 1942	October 1944	
Wolfe	Submarine depot ship	UK	August 1944	>August 1945	
Woolwich	Destroyer Depot ship	UK	late 1943	>August 1945	

== Also to be classified ==
Ship	Nationality	Date joined	Date left	Fate/ next assignment
RFA Empire Salvage	UK			
Endeavour				
Karanja				
Lucia	UK	September 1939	>April 1942	
Barbette	UK	<September 1939		Sold to the Turkish Navy March 1941
Barnet	UK	<September 1939		
Fastnet	UK			
Redstart	UK	<September 1939		
