= List of ships of World War II (Q) =

The List of ships of the Second World War contains major military vessels of the war, arranged alphabetically and by type. The list includes armed vessels that served during the war and in the immediate aftermath, inclusive of localized ongoing combat operations, garrison surrenders, post-surrender occupation, colony re-occupation, troop and prisoner repatriation, to the end of 1945. For smaller vessels, see also list of World War II ships of less than 1000 tons. Some uncompleted Axis ships are included, out of historic interest. Ships are designated to the country under which they operated for the longest period of the Second World War, regardless of where they were built or previous service history. Submarines show submerged displacement.

Click on headers to sort column alphabetically.

List of ships of World War II (Q)
Ship	Country or organization	Class	Type	Displacement (tons)	First commissioned	Fate
Quadrant	Royal Navy	Q	destroyer	1,692	26 November 1942	Paid off late 1945
Quail	Royal Navy	Q	destroyer	1,692	7 January 1943	Damaged by mine 15 November 1943, sunk under tow 18 May 1944
Quality	Royal Navy	Q	destroyer	1,692	7 September 1942	Paid off 8 October 1945
Quantock	Royal Navy	Hunt	destroyer	1,050	6 February 1941	Scrapped 1978
Queen	Royal Navy	Ruler	escort carrier	8,333	7 December 1943	Paid off July 1947, scrapped 1972
Queen Elizabeth	Royal Navy	Queen Elizabeth	battleship	31,000	22 December 1914	Decommissioned and scrapped 1948
Queenborough	Royal Navy	Q	destroyer	1,692	15 September 1942	Paid off September 1945
Quentin	Royal Navy	Q	destroyer	1,692	15 April 1942	Sunk 2 December 1942
Quesnel	Royal Canadian Navy	Flower	corvette	925	23 May 1941	Paid off 3 July 1945
Quetta	Royal Indian Navy	Basset	minesweeper	529	1941–1944	1941–1944
Quiberon	Royal Navy	Q	destroyer	1,692	22 October 1942	26 June 1964
Quick	United States Navy	Gleaves	destroyer	1,630	3 July 1942	Decommissioned 1949, scrapped 1973
Quickmatch	Royal Navy	Q	destroyer	1,692	14 September 1942	Paid off 26 April 1963
Quidora	Chilean Navy	H	submarine	441	1917	Scrapped 1945
Quilliam	Royal Navy	Q	destroyer	1,692	22 October 1942	21 November 1945
Quincy (II)	United States Navy	New Orleans	heavy cruiser	9,375	9 June 1936	Sunk 9 August 1942
Quincy (III)	United States Navy	Baltimore	heavy cruiser	13,600	December 1943	Decommissioned 1954 and scrapped in 1974
Quorn	Royal Navy	Hunt	destroyer	1,050	21 September 1940	Sunk 3 August 1944
