= HMS Roebuck (H95) =

R-class destroyer converted to Type 15 frigate of the Royal Navy

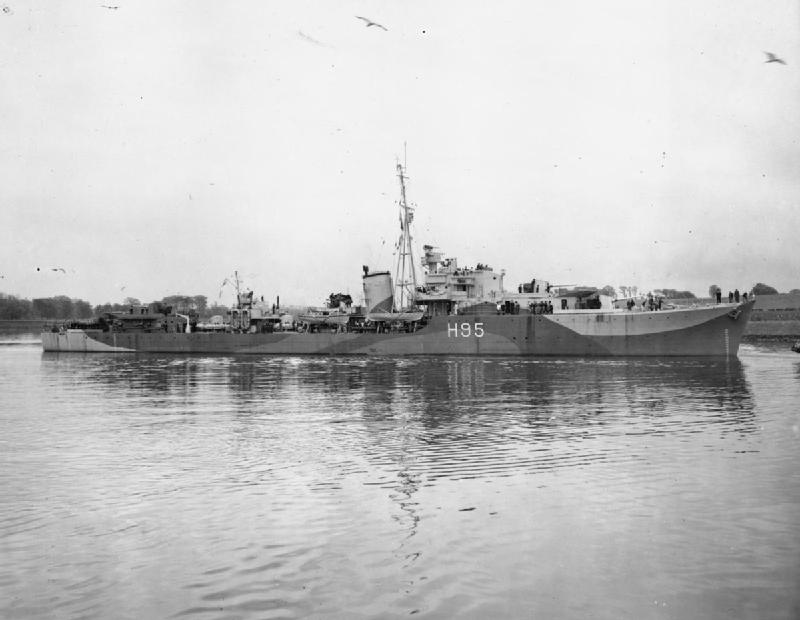
- Roebuck in June 1943

History

United Kingdom
- Name: HMS Roebuck
- Ordered: May 1940
- Builder: Scotts Shipbuilding & Engineering Co.
- Laid down: 19 June 1941
- Launched: 10 December 1942 (premature)
- Commissioned: 10 June 1943
- Decommissioned: 1962
- Identification: Pennant number H95/F195
- Honours and awards: Sabang (1944); Burma (1944–45)
- Fate: Scrapped, 1968
- Badge: On a Field White, a Roebuck guardant proper.

General characteristics As R-class destroyer
- Class & type: R-class destroyer
- Displacement: 1,705 tons (1,732 tonnes); 2,425 tons (2,464 tonnes) full load
- Length: 358.25 ft (109.19 m) o/a
- Beam: 35.75 ft (10.90 m)
- Draught: 9.5 ft (2.9 m)
- Propulsion: 2 x Admiralty 3-drum water-tube boilers, Parsons geared steam turbines, 40,000 shp (30,000 kW) on 2 shafts
- Speed: 36 kn (67 km/h)
- Range: 4,675 nmi (8,658 km) at 20 knots (37 km/h)
- Complement: 176
- Sensors & processing systems: Radar Type 290 air warning; Radar Type 285 ranging & bearing
- Armament: 4 × QF 4.7-inch (120-mm) Mk.IX guns single mounts CP Mk.XVIII; 4 × QF 2 pdr Mk.VIII (40 mm L/39), quad mount Mk.VII; 2 × 2, 4 × 1 QF 20 mm Oerlikon, single mount P Mk.III; 8 (2x4) tubes for 21-inch (530 mm) torpedoes Mk.IX; 4 × throwers & 2 x racks, 70 depth charges

General characteristics As Type 15 frigate
- Displacement: 2,300 tons (standard); 2,700 tons (full load)
- Length: 358 ft (109 m) o/a
- Beam: 37.75 ft (11.51 m)
- Draught: 14.5 ft (4.4 m)
- Propulsion: 2 × Admiralty 3-drum boilers, steam turbines on 2 shafts, 40,000 shp
- Speed: 31 kn (57 km/h) (full load)
- Range: 4,675 nmi (8,658 km) at 20 knots (37 km/h)
- Complement: 174
- Sensors & processing systems: Radar; Type 293Q target indication.; Type 277Q surface search; Type 974 navigation; Type 262 fire control on director CRBF; Type 1010 Cossor Mark 10 IFF; Sonar: Type 174 search; Type 162 target classification; Type 170 attack
- Armament: 1 × twin 4 in gun Mark 19; 1 × twin 40mm Bofors Mk.5; 2 × Limbo Mark 10 A/S mortar

HMS Roebuck was an R-class destroyer of the British Royal Navy that saw service during World War II. She was the fifteenth ship to carry this traditional ship name, after a small deer native to the British Isles, which was used as far back as the reign of Queen Elizabeth I.

== Construction ==
Ordered in May 1940 from Scotts shipyard in Greenock, construction was delayed and she was not laid down until 19 June 1941. Roebuck then had the dubious honour of being launched prematurely by an air raid on 10 December 1942, her partially complete hulk lying submerged in the dockyard for three months before it was salvaged and completed in May 1943.

== Service history ==
=== World War II ===
==== 1943 ====
After sea trials, Roebuck was accepted into service on 10 June and assigned to the 11th Destroyer Flotilla of the Eastern Fleet, first taking passage to Scapa Flow to work-up with Home Fleet. In August, she was prepared for foreign service and then took passage to Freetown, finally joining the Flotilla in the Indian Ocean in September, which was deployed for convoy defence and patrols.

==== 1944 ====
On 12 March, Roebuck formed part of the escort for the aircraft carrier Battler and the cruisers Suffolk and Newcastle, with the destroyer Quadrant, during the search in the Indian Ocean for the German U-boat supply ship Brake. After being intercepted by aircraft Brake was scuttled by her own crew.

In June Roebuck was deployed with Fleet units off Burma and bombarded Martaban. On 19 June, she formed part of the destroyer screen of Force 60 along with the destroyers Quality, Quickmatch, Rotherham, Racehorse, Relentless and Raider, providing protection for the aircraft carrier Illustrious, the battlecruiser Renown, Richelieu, and cruisers Nigeria, Kenya and Ceylon.

On 25 July, she was deployed with the Flotilla as the screen for Eastern Fleet major units covering operations by the aircraft carriers Victorious and Indomitable against targets at Sabang and Sumatra in "Operation Crimson".

In August Roebuck took passage to Simon's Town for a refit by HM Dockyard, rejoining the Flotilla at Trincomalee in November.

==== 1945 ====
In February Roebuck joined Force 68 for offensive patrols and bombarded the Cocos Islands with destroyers Rocket, Rapid and Rotherham in Operations "Office" and "Training".

On 27 April, she was deployed with Force 63 as the screen for major fleet units providing cover for the landings at Rangoon in "Operation Dracula", and on the 30th was deployed with Force 62, and bombarded Matapan with the destroyers Racehorse and Redoubt in "Operation Gable" which also included the interception of enemy evacuation vessels. On 1 May she took part in bombardments at Car Nicobar with the Flotilla in "Operation Bishop".

On 13 May, Roebuck, Redoubt and Racehorse, escorted Nigeria from Trincomalee as Force 63, during a search for Japanese warships evacuating personnel from the Andaman and Nicobar Islands, and remained with the Fleet screen during the attacks on Japanese ships.

On 18 June, she was deployed with the flotilla as a screen for the ships of 21st Aircraft Carrier Squadron, which comprised the escort carriers Stalker, Khedive and Ameer, and the cruisers Royalist and Suffolk, which were carrying out photo-reconnaissance flights over southern Malaya in "Operation Balsam".

On 5 July, she was deployed with the cruiser Nigeria, and destroyers Eskimo and Vigilant to cover minesweeping operations off Malaya and the Nicobar Islands. She then took part in bombardment of Nancowry.

In August, Roebuck was preparing for large-scale landings in Malaya in "Operation Zipper", but the surrender of Japan brought hostilities to a close before they could be put into effect. She sailed to Singapore to support the re-occupation until sailing to Simon's Town in October to refit.

=== Post-war ===
Between May and June 1946 HMS Roebuck performed training exercises with HNLMS Karel Doorman in British waters.

Following the successful conversion of her sister ships Rocket and Relentless, Roebuck was selected for conversion to a Type 15 anti-submarine frigate in 1952. She was given the new pennant number F195.

On completion of the conversion in May 1953 she was recommissioned for service in the 5th Frigate Squadron. In 1953, she took part in the Fleet Review to celebrate the Coronation of Queen Elizabeth II.

In 1957, she refitted for training duties and joined the Dartmouth Training Squadron, replacing HMS Carron. She went into refit again in 1959. Recommissioned in May 1960, she joined the 17th Escort Squadron and remained on the operational list until returning to pay-off into reserve at Plymouth in 1962.

== Disposal and fate ==
Before being placed on the Disposal List the ship was de-equipped at HM Dockyard Devonport. Roebuck was sold to the British Iron & Steel Corporation (BISCO) for demolition by Thos. W. Ward. She was towed to the breaker's yard at Inverkeithing on 8 August 1968.

== Publications ==
- Colledge, J. J.; Warlow, Ben (2006) [1969]. Ships of the Royal Navy: The Complete Record of All Fighting Ships of the Royal Navy from the 15th Century to the Present (3rd Rev ed.). London: Chatham Publishing. ISBN 978-1-86176-281-8. OCLC 67375475.
- English, John (2001). Obdurate to Daring: British Fleet Destroyers 1941–45. Windsor, UK: World Ship Society. ISBN 978-0-9560769-0-8.
- Friedman, Norman (2006). British Destroyers & Frigates: The Second World War and After. Annapolis, Maryland: Naval Institute Press. ISBN 1-86176-137-6.
- Lenton, H. T. (1998). British & Empire Warships of the Second World War. Annapolis, Maryland: Naval Institute Press. ISBN 1-55750-048-7.
- Marriott, Leo, Royal Navy Destroyers Since 1945. Ian Allan, 1989. ISBN 0-7110-1817-0
- Raven, Alan & Roberts, John (1978). War Built Destroyers O to Z Classes. London: Bivouac Books. ISBN 0-85680-010-4.
- Richardson, Ian (August 2021). Osborne, Richard (ed.). "Type 15 Frigates, Part 2: Ship Histories". Warships: Marine News Supplement. 75 (8): 381–391. ISSN 0966-6958.
- Rohwer, Jürgen (2005). Chronology of the War at Sea 1939–1945: The Naval History of World War Two (Third Revised ed.). Annapolis, Maryland: Naval Institute Press. ISBN 1-59114-119-2.
- Whitley, M. J. (1988). Destroyers of World War 2. Annapolis, Maryland: Naval Institute Press. ISBN 0-87021-326-1.
