= HMS Quail (G45) =

Destroyer of the Royal Navy

Coordinates: 40°03′N 17°15′E

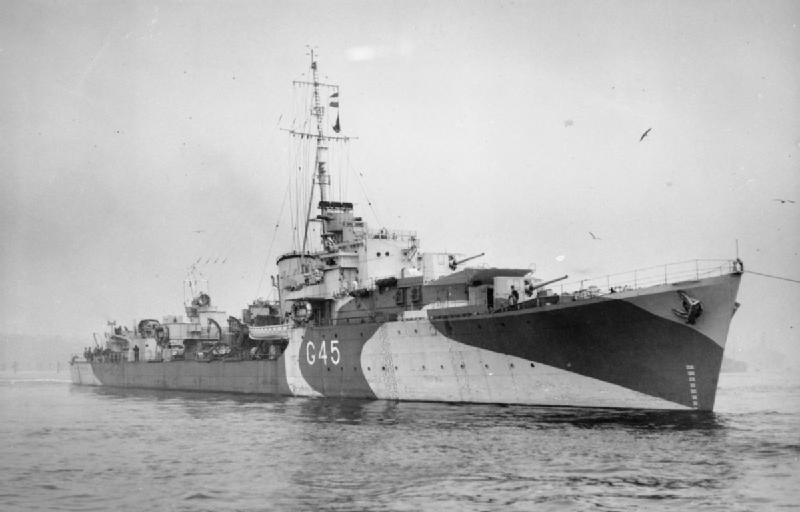

History

United Kingdom
- Name: HMS Quail
- Ordered: 2 April 1940
- Builder: Hawthorn Leslie & Company, Hebburn
- Laid down: 30 September 1940
- Launched: 1 June 1942
- Commissioned: 7 January 1943
- Motto: 'I will be prompt at a signal'
- Honours and awards: Sicily 1943; Salerno 1943; Mediterranean 1943
- Fate: Damaged by a mine on 15 November 1943; Sunk under tow on 18 May 1944
- Badge: On a Field per fess Blue and Green, a quail White

General characteristics
- Class & type: Q-class destroyer
- Displacement: 1,692 tons (1,720 tonnes); 2,411 tons (2,449 tonnes) full load
- Length: 358 ft 3 in (109.19 m) o/a
- Beam: 35 ft 9 in (10.90 m)
- Draught: 9 ft 6 in (2.90 m)
- Propulsion: 2 x Admiralty 3-drum water-tube boilers, Parsons geared steam turbines, 40,000 shp (30,000 kW) on 2 shafts
- Speed: 36 kn (67 km/h)
- Range: 4,675 nmi (8,658 km) at 20 knots (37 km/h)
- Complement: 176
- Sensors & processing systems: Radar Type 290 air warning; Radar Type 285 ranging & bearing
- Armament: 4 × QF 4.7 in Mk.XII (119 mm L/45) on single mounts CP Mk.XVIII; 4 × QF 2 pdr Mk.VIII (40 mm L/39), quad mount Mk.VII; 6 × QF 20 mm Oerlikon, single mount P Mk.III; 8 (2x4) tubes for 21 in torpedoes Mk.IX; up to 3 x throwers & 3 x racks, to 45 depth charges

HMS Quail was a Q-class destroyer of the Royal Navy. She served during the Second World War but her career lasted less than a year before she was damaged by a mine and withdrawn from active service.

== Construction and commissioning ==
Quail was ordered on 2 April 1940 to serve with the 3rd Emergency Flotilla. She was laid down on 30 September 1940 from the yards of Hawthorn Leslie & Company, Hebburn and launched on 1 June 1942. She was commissioned on 7 January 1943 having cost a total of £436,576, excluding equipment supplied by the Admiralty such as armaments, wireless and radar equipment. She was adopted by the civil community of Islington. Greater London in March 1942 following a successful Warship Week for National Savings.

== Career ==
=== Convoy escort ===
After spending December 1942 undergoing contractors' trials, Quail was commissioned on 7 January 1943. She then took passage to join the Home Fleet at Scapa Flow, where she carried out working up exercises. In February she was nominated to escort the joint military convoys WS27 and KMF10A during their passage from the Clyde. WS27 was bound for the Middle East via the Cape of Good Hope, whilst KMF10A was headed for the Mediterranean via Gibraltar. Having completed the escort duties, the naval command intended that Quail would join the 3rd Flotilla in the Indian Ocean. She joined Convoy WS27 in the Clyde on 27 February, along with the battleship Malaya and the destroyers Raider, Quadrant, Queenborough and Wolverine as the ocean escort for the convoy's passage through the Atlantic. Quail remained with Convoy WS27 when the ships of KMF10A were detached on 2 March to sail to Gibraltar. On 5 March Quadrant was detached and on 8 March Quail, Queenborough and Raider were detached from the convoy on its arrival at Freetown, Sierra Leone. They were then retained at Freetown for convoy defence, whilst the planned transfer to the Indian Ocean was cancelled due to future requirements in support of the planned allied landings in Mediterranean.

=== Fleet screening ===
On 11 March Quail was deployed with Queenborough and Raider to cover the passage of convoy WS27, bound for Durban. They escorted it to Durban, arriving on 24 March when they were detached. They returned to Freetown in April, where Quail was nominated to return to the UK. She took passage from Freetown on 29 April in company with the destroyer Quality. They arrived in the UK, and rejoined the flotilla at Scapa Flow in May. In June Quail was nominated to support the allied landings in Sicily (Operation Husky). She sailed for Gibraltar as part of an escort for capital ships of the Home Fleet that were also assigned to cover the landings. She deployed out of Malta and on 8 July sailed as part of a screen for the battleships Nelson, Rodney, Warspite and Valiant, the aircraft carriers Indomitable and Formidable and the cruisers Aurora, Penelope, Cleopatra and Euryalus, with the destroyers Quilliam, Queenborough, Isis, Faulknor, Echo, Intrepid, Raider, Eclipse, Fury, Inglefield, Ilex, Troubridge, Tyrian, Tumult, Offa, the Greek Vasilissa Olga and the Polish ORP Piorun in the Western Mediterranean. They provided cover against Italian interference in the allied landings, and by 12 July the escorting destroyers were deployed on interception patrols. On 14 July Quail and Quilliam deployed with the cruisers Cleopatra and Euryalus off the east coast of Sicily.

=== Bombardments ===
Quail continued on these duties throughout August and on 21 August she carried out a bombardment of the Italian mainland from the Straits of Messina. Ten days later on 31 August she was part of a screen for the battleships Nelson and Rodney and the cruiser Orion during the preliminary bombardment of the Italian coast between Reggio Calabria and Pessaro before the allied landings in Italy. Quail carried out bombardments and screening duties with the destroyers Offa, Petard, Queenborough, Quilliam, Tartar, Troubridge, Tyrian and ORP Piorun in early September. On 2 September Quail bombarded the area south of Reggio and from 9 September to 16 September she joined other destroyers in screening the battleships Nelson, Rodney, Warspite and Valiant, and the aircraft carriers Illustrious and Formidable. They provided gunfire support off the beach head and carried out anti submarine and E-boat patrols. In October Quail was transferred to the Adriatic and based at Bari to support military operations and escort convoys. On 22 October she intercepted and captured an enemy merchant ship during a patrol.

== Mining and sinking ==
On 15 November, whilst on patrol in the Adriatic, Quail struck a mine that had been part of a barrage laid by the German submarine U-453 on 25 October. She was beached the following day to await salvage. In December she was towed to Bari to undergo temporary repairs. She spent the period between January and April 1944 under temporary repair to allow her to make passage to Taranto for permanent repairs. She was towed to Taranto but whilst there it was arranged that she would be repaired at Malta. After further preparations, she departed under tow for Malta in May, but capsized and sank en route in the Gulf of Taranto on 18 May.

On 5 June 2002 an Italian diver team led by Claudia Serpieri discovered the wreck of Quail and filmed it. She currently lies at a depth of 90 metres (300 ft).
