= Operation Balsam =

- Part of World War II
- Type: Naval operation
- Planned by: British
- Commanded by: Geoffrey Oliver
- Objective: Naval bombardment and aerial strikes on Japanese airfields in Sumatra, Japanese vessels in the Strait of Malacca, and aerial reconnaissance
- Date: 10 June 1945
- Outcome: Runways were put out of action, buildings, installations, hangars, locomotives, rolling stock and grounded aircraft strafed
- Casualties: O. F. Wheatley

Operation Balsam was a British naval operation in World War II, from 10–20 June 1945, under the command of Commodore Geoffrey Oliver. The third in a string of similar missions, the objectives were the naval bombardment and aerial strikes on Japanese airfields in Sumatra, Japanese vessels in the Strait of Malacca, and aerial reconnaissance.

== Operational detail ==
Naval forces involved sailed from Trincomalee on 14 June 1945. Ships involved included the escort carriers HMS Stalker, HMS Khedive, HMS Ameer; cruisers HMS Suffolk and HMS Royalist; and five destroyers, HMS Rotherham, HMS Relentless, HMS Redoubt, HMS Roebuck, and HMS Racehorse. The carriers transported Grumman F6F Hellcats of 804 Squadron and 808 Squadron, and Supermarine Seafires of 809 Squadron.

Flights were restricted to photo-reconnaissance over southern Malaya for the first few days of the active operation, on 18 and 19 June. One account describes how the fighter pilots "were growing restless on a diet of undiluted CAPS, but Commodore Oliver reassured them they would have an opportunity to 'leave their cards'". On 20 June, the fighters engaged in their first offensive sorties against the airfields at Lhokseumawe, Medan and Binjai. The results were reported as follows:

Runways were put out of action, buildings, installations, hangars, locomotives, rolling stock and grounded aircraft strafed. There was no enemy air opposition but one Hellcat was lost to flak over Medan - a particular tragedy for 808 Sq., since the pilot was their CO, Lt. Cdr. O. F. Wheatley, RNVR. His Hellcat was last seen in flames, with its tail shot away. It was his first flight after taking over command of the squadron.
