= INS Rana =

The following ships of the Indian Navy have been named Rana:

- INS Rana (D115) was a R-class destroyer acquired in 1949 from the Royal Navy, where it served in World War II as HMS Raider (H15)
- INS Rana (D52) is a Rajput-class destroyer, currently in active service with the Indian Navy
