= Tumult =

Tumult may refer to:

- Violent and noisy commotion or disturbance of a crowd
- A general outbreak or disorder, riot

== Other uses ==
- Tumult Records, an independent record label based in San Francisco
- Tumult (album), an album by Dutch punk rock band The Ex
- Tumult, the twelfth song from Stone Sour (album)
- HMS Tumult, the name of two ships of the Royal Navy
- Tumult (comics), a Marvel Comics character

== See also ==
- Tumultuous (disambiguation)
