= R-class destroyer =

R-class destroyer may refer to:

- R-class destroyer (1916), a class of Royal navy destroyers, launched in 1916 and 1917, that served in World War I
- Q and R-class destroyer, a class of Royal navy destroyers, launched in 1942, that served in World War II
