= HMS Rocket (H92) =

R-class destroyer converted to Type 15 frigate of the Royal Navy

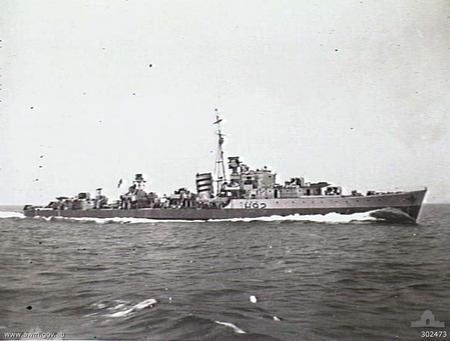
- HMS Rocket circa. 1945

History

United Kingdom
- Name: HMS Rocket
- Ordered: May 1940
- Builder: Scotts Shipbuilding and Engineering Company, Greenock
- Laid down: 14 March 1941
- Launched: 28 October 1942
- Commissioned: 4 August 1943
- Reclassified: Type 15 frigate from 1951
- Identification: Pennant number H92/F191
- Motto: 'Upward and Onward'
- Fate: Sold for scrapping in 1967
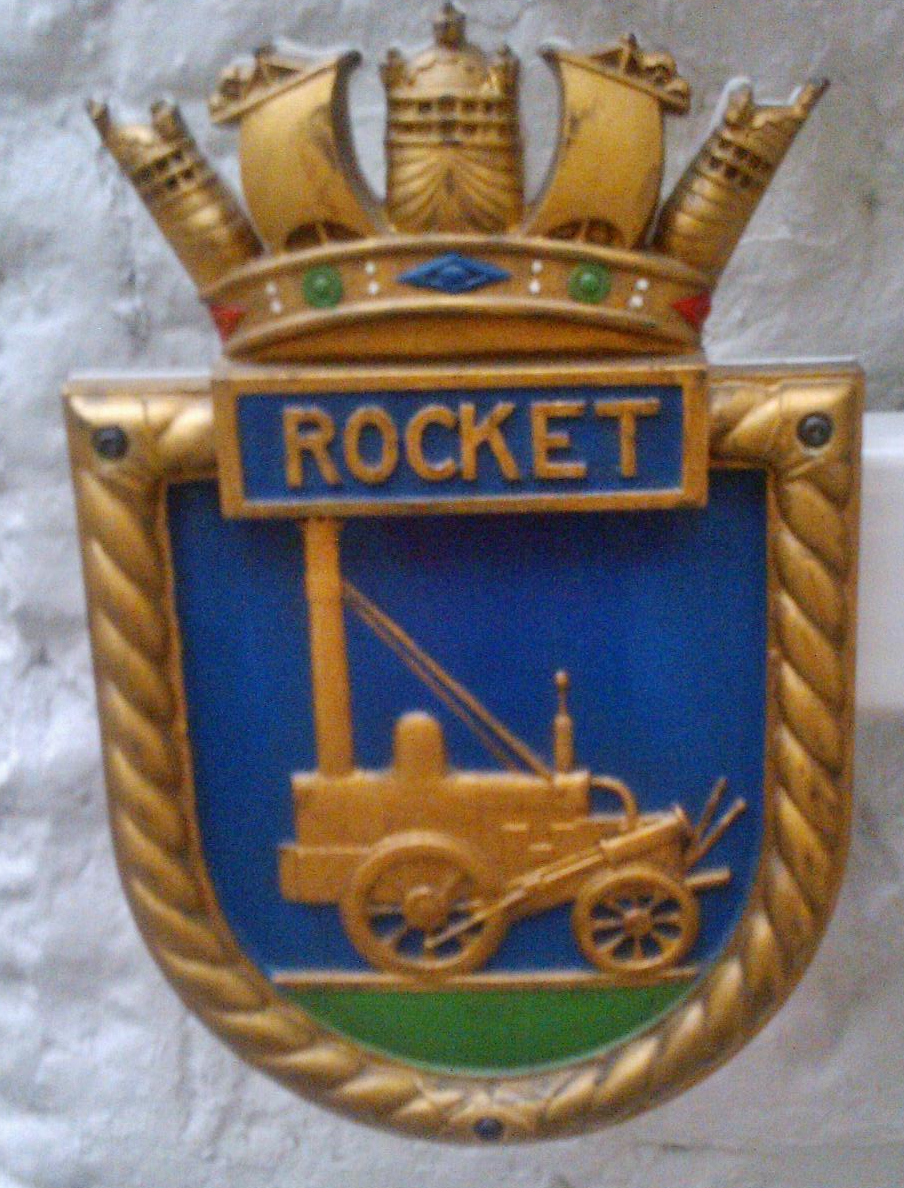
- Badge

General characteristics As R-class destroyer
- Class & type: R-class destroyer
- Displacement: 1,705 tons (1,732 tonnes); 2,425 tons (2,464 tonnes) full load
- Length: 358.25 ft (109.19 m) o/a
- Beam: 35.75 ft (10.90 m)
- Draught: 9.5 ft (2.9 m)
- Propulsion: 2 x Admiralty 3-drum water-tube boilers, Parsons geared steam turbines, 40,000 shp (30,000 kW) on 2 shafts
- Speed: 36 kn (67 km/h)
- Range: 4,675 nmi (8,658 km) at 20 knots (37 km/h)
- Complement: 176
- Sensors & processing systems: Radar Type 290 air warning; Radar Type 285 ranging & bearing
- Armament: 4 × QF 4.7-inch (120-mm) Mk.IX guns single mounts CP Mk.XVIII; 4 × QF 2 pdr Mk.VIII (40 mm L/39), quad mount Mk.VII; 2 × 2, 4 × 1 QF 20 mm Oerlikon, single mount P Mk.III<; 8 (2x4) tubes for 21-inch (530 mm) torpedoes Mk.IX; 4 × throwers & 2 x racks, 70 depth charges

General characteristics As Type 15 frigate
- Displacement: 2,300 tons (standard); 2,700 tons (full load)
- Length: 358 ft (109 m) o/a
- Beam: 37.75 ft (11.51 m)
- Draught: 14.5 ft (4.4 m)
- Propulsion: 2 × Admiralty 3-drum boilers, steam turbines on 2 shafts, 40,000 shp
- Speed: 31 kn (57 km/h) (full load)
- Range: 4,675 nmi (8,658 km) at 20 knots (37 km/h)
- Complement: 174
- Sensors & processing systems: Radar; Type 293Q target indication.; Type 277Q surface search; Type 974 navigation; Type 262 fire control on director CRBF; Type 1010 Cossor Mark 10 IFF; Sonar: Type 174 search; Type 162 target classification; Type 170 attack
- Armament: 1 × twin 4 in gun Mark 19; 1 × twin 40mm Bofors Mk.5; 2 × Limbo Mark 10 A/S mortar

HMS Rocket was an R-class destroyer of the Royal Navy that saw service during Second World War. Built by Scotts Shipbuilding and Engineering Company in Greenock, Scotland, she was launched in October 1942 and commissioned in August 1943.

== Design and construction ==
The British Admiralty ordered the eight destroyers of the R-class on 2 April 1940 as the 4th Emergency Flotilla (together with eight similar Q-class destroyers). Work on the R-class was suspended on 28 May to concentrate effort on ships that could be completed quickly, owing to the risk of German invasion, with work resuming on 9 September 1940, after the worst of the invasion worries had subsided. The R-class were War Emergency Programme destroyers, intended for general duties, including use as anti-submarine escort, and were to be suitable for mass-production. They were based on the hull and machinery of the pre-war J-class destroyers, but with a lighter armament (effectively whatever armament was available) in order to speed production.

The R-class were 358 feet 3 inches (109.19 m) long overall, 348 feet 0 inches (106.07 m) at the waterline and 339 feet 6 inches (103.48 m) between perpendiculars, with a beam of 35 feet 8 inches (10.87 m) and a draught of 9 feet 6 inches (2.90 m) mean and 13 feet 6 inches (4.11 m) full load. Displacement was 1,705 long tons (1,732 t) standard and 2,425 long tons (2,464 t) full load. Two Admiralty 3-drum water-tube boilers supplied steam at 300 pounds per square inch (2,100 kPa) and 630 °F (332 °C) to two sets of Parsons single-reduction geared steam turbines, which drove two propeller shafts. The machinery was rated at 40,000 shaft horsepower (30,000 kW) giving a maximum speed of 36 knots (41 mph; 67 km/h) and 32 knots (37 mph; 59 km/h) at full load. 615 tons of oil were carried, giving a range of 4,675 nautical miles (5,380 mi; 8,658 km) at 20 knots (23 mph; 37 km/h).

The ship had a main gun armament of four 4.7-inch (120 mm) QF Mk. IX guns, capable of elevating to an angle of 40 degrees, giving a degree of anti-aircraft capability. The close-in anti-aircraft armament was one quadruple 2 pounder (40 mm) pom-pom and eight Oerlikon 20 mm cannons (2 twin and 4 single mounts). Two quadruple mounts for 21-inch (533 mm) torpedoes were fitted, while the ship had a depth charge outfit of four depth charge mortars and two racks, with a total of 70 charges carried. In 1945 the 4 single Oerlikon guns were replaced by 4 single Bofors 40 mm guns.

Rocket was fitted with a mast-mounted Type 290 air warning radar with a Type 285 gunnery radar mounted on the ship's high-angle fire control director. She was later fitted with a Type 272 surface search radar on a lattice mast between the two torpedo tube mounts. She had a crew of 176 officers and other ranks.

Rocket was laid down at Scotts Shipbuilding and Engineering Company's Greenock shipyard on 14 March 1941, was launched on 28 October 1942 and commissioned on 4 August 1943. She was the eighth ship of that name to serve with the Royal Navy.

== Service ==
=== Second World War ===
After commissioning, Rocket worked up at Scapa Flow until 2 October 1943, when she joined Plymouth Command. Duties included operations against German shipping along the coast of Brittany, known as Operation Tunnel. Rocket replaced the destroyer Ulster on these operations, and took part in patrols on four consecutive nights between 14/15 October and 17/18 October with the hope of intercepting the German blockade runner, Münsterland. Rocket took part in another attempt to intercept Münsterland on the night of 22/23 October. This time, the British force encountered German torpedo boats in the Battle of Sept-Îles. The cruiser Charybdis and destroyer Limbourne were torpedoed. Charybdis sank within 45 minutes, but Limbourne remained afloat, and the destroyer Talybont attempted to take Limbourne under tow, but the attempt failed, and the stricken destroyer was scuttled by Rocket and Talybont.

On 29 November 1943 Rocket and the destroyer Tumult depth-charged and sank the German submarine U-86 east of the Azores in position 40°52′N 018°54′W. Rocket joined the 11th Destroyer Flotilla, part of the Eastern Fleet, based at Trincomalee, Ceylon (now Sri Lanka) on 12 February 1944. On 22 July 1944, the Eastern Fleet left port to take part in Operation Crimson, an attack on Sabang. The force arrived off Sabang on 25 July, and after an airstrike launched from the carriers Illustrious and Victorious, Rocket took part in a bombardment of Sabang by the battleships, cruisers and destroyers of the fleet, with the destroyers shelling a radar station. From 16 to 23 September 1944, Rocket took part in Operation Light, an airstrike launched from Indomitable and Victorious against Sigli, Sumatra on 18 September.

On 21–25 February 1945, Rocket, together with sister ships Rapid, Roebuck and Rotherham carried out an anti-shipping sweep in the Andaman Sea, and while no shipping was found, the force shelled Great Coco Island on 24 February. The operation was repeated from 27 February, with three coasters being sunk off the coast of Burma on the night of 1/2 March, and on 3 March, the force shelled the harbour of Port Blair on South Andaman Island, sinking two sailing ships. On 14 May 1945, Rocket was escorting a troopship when she was ordered to leave her charge and join Racehorse, Redoubt and Roebuck in one of several groups searching for the Japanese heavy cruiser Haguro. Haguro was attacked and sunk by another one of the groups, consisting of Saumarez, Verulam, Venus, Vigilant, and Virago on the night of 15/16 May. Rocket was assigned to take part in Operation Zipper, amphibious landings near Port Swettenham and Port Dickson on the west coast of Malaya planned for 9 and 12 September 1945, but the surrender of Japan caused plans to be changed, and Rocket was diverted to Sebang.

=== Post-War ===
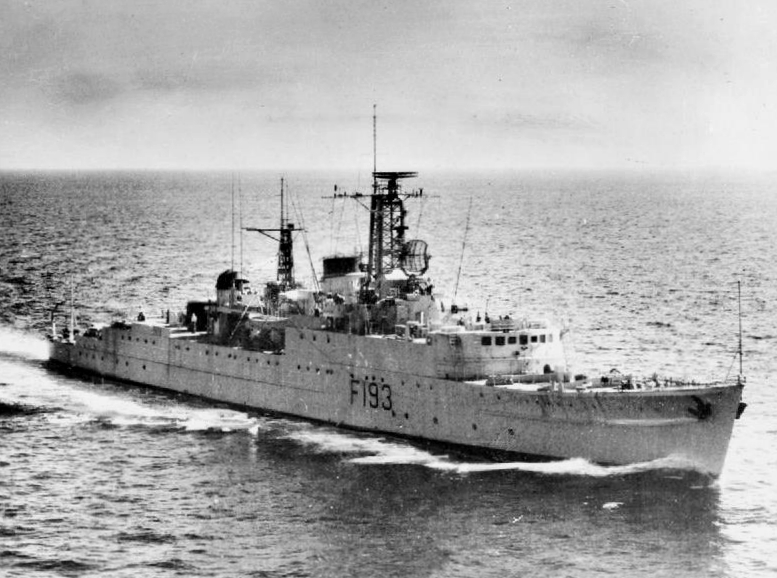
Rocket after her conversion to a Type 15 frigate

Rocket returned to Britain in October 1945, and in 1946, replaced the destroyer Highlander as an air target ship at Rosyth. She was reduced to reserve on 4 September 1957. In May 1949 she was moved to Portsmouth, while from November 1949 to July 1951 she was converted at Devonport Dockyard into a Type 15 fast anti-submarine frigate, with the new pennant number F193.

On 18 May 1951 she was re-commissioned for the 3rd Training Squadron, based in Londonderry Port. In 1953 she took part in the Fleet Review to celebrate the Coronation of Queen Elizabeth II. In September 1953, the ship was sabotaged, with leads to the port Telemotor of the steering gear cut. A stoker pleaded guilty to charges of damaging the ship under the Malicious Damage Act 1861 and was sentenced to four years imprisonment and dismissal from the navy with disgrace. In 1954 she returned to reserve at Rosyth, before being re-commissioned the following year. In November 1956 she returned to reserve at Chatham, then transferred to the reserve at Portsmouth the following year. On 28 October 1960 she was re-commissioned at Portsmouth and sailed to the Far East to join the 6th Frigate Squadron.

=== Decommissioning and disposal ===
Rocket returned to Portsmouth on 11 May 1962 and de-commissioned. She was finally scrapped at Dalmuir in March 1967.

== Bibliography ==
- Colledge, J. J.; Warlow, Ben (2006) [1969]. Ships of the Royal Navy: The Complete Record of All Fighting Ships of the Royal Navy from the 15th Century to the Present (3rd Rev ed.). London: Chatham Publishing. ISBN 978-1-86176-281-8. OCLC 67375475.
- Critchley, Mike (1982). British Warships Since 1945: Part 3: Destroyers. Liskeard, UK: Maritime Book. ISBN 0-9506323-9-2.
- English, John (2001). Obdurate to Daring: British Fleet Destroyers 1941–45. Windsor, UK: World Ship Society. ISBN 978-0-9560769-0-8.
- English, John (1993). Amazon to Ivanhoe: British Standard Destroyers of the 1930s. Kendal, UK: World Ship Society. ISBN 0-905617-64-9.
- Friedman, Norman (2006). British Destroyers & Frigates: The Second World War and After. Barnsley, UK: Seaforth Publishing. ISBN 978-1-84832-015-4.
- Gardiner, Robert; Chesneau, Roger, eds. (1980). Conway's All The World's Fighting Ships 1922–1946. London: Conway Maritime Press. ISBN 0-85177-146-7.
- Hepper, David (2022). British Warship Losses in the Modern Era: 1920–1982. Barnsley, UK: Seaforth Publishing. ISBN 978-1-3990-9766-6.
- Hobbs, David (2017). The British Pacific Fleet: The Royal Navy's Most Powerful Strike Force. Barnsley, UK: Seaforth Publishing. ISBN 978-1-5267-0283-8.
- Lenton, H. T. (1970). Navies of the Second World War: British Fleet & Escort Destroyers Volume Two. London: Macdonald & Co. ISBN 0-356-03122-5.
- Marriott, Leo (1983). Royal Navy Frigates 1945–1983. London: Ian Allan. ISBN 0-7110-1322-5.
- Niestlé, Axel (2014). German U-Boat Losses During World War II: Details of Destruction. Barnsley, UK: Frontline Books. ISBN 978-1-84832-210-3.
- Raven, Alan; Roberts, John (1978). War Built Destroyers O to Z Classes. London: Bivouac Books. ISBN 0-85680-010-4.
- Rohwer, Jürgen (2005). Chronology of the War at Sea 1939–1945: The Naval History of World War Two (Third Revised ed.). Annapolis, Maryland: Naval Institute Press. ISBN 1-59114-119-2.
- Whitby, Michael (2022). "The Challenges of Operation 'Tunnel', September 1943 — April 1944". In Jordan, John (ed.). Warship 2022. Oxford: Osprey Publishing. pp. 29–46. ISBN 978-1-4728-4781-2.
- Whitley, M. J. (2000). Destroyers of World War 2: An International Encyclopedia. London: Cassell & Co. ISBN 1-85409-521-8.
- Winser, John de S. (2002). British Invasion Fleets: The Mediterranean and beyond: 1942–1945. Gravesend, UK: World Ship Society. ISBN 0-9543310-0-1.
- Winton, John (1970). The Forgotten Fleet: The British Navy in the Pacific 1944–1945. New York: Coward-McCann, Inc.
