= H92 =

H92 may refer to:

- Sikorsky S-92
- HMS Glowworm (H92), a G-class destroyer launched in 1935; sunk in 1940
- HMS Rocket (H92), a R-class destroyer launched in 1942; de-commissioned in 1962
