= HMAS Norman (G49) =

1940 N-class destroyer

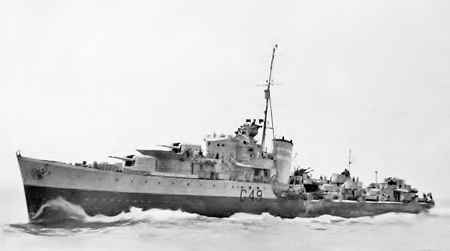
- HMAS Norman at sea

History

Australia
- Name: Norman
- Builder: John I. Thornycroft & Company
- Laid down: 27 July 1939
- Launched: 30 October 1940
- Commissioned: 29 September 1941
- Decommissioned: October 1945
- Motto: Cedere Nescio; I Know Not How To Yield
- Honours and awards: Battle honours: Indian Ocean 1942–44; East Indies 1944; Burma 1944–45; Okinawa 1945
- Fate: Broken up for scrap

General characteristics (as built)
- Class & type: N-class destroyer
- Displacement: 1,773 long tons (1,801 t) (standard); 2,384 long tons (2,422 t) (deep load)
- Length: 356 ft 6 in (108.7 m) (o/a)
- Beam: 35 ft 9 in (10.9 m)
- Draught: 12 ft 6 in (3.8 m)
- Installed power: 40,000 shp (30,000 kW); 2 × Admiralty 3-drum boilers
- Propulsion: 2 shafts; 2 steam turbines
- Speed: 36 knots (67 km/h; 41 mph)
- Range: 5,500 nmi (10,200 km; 6,300 mi) at 15 knots (28 km/h; 17 mph)
- Complement: 183
- Sensors & processing systems: ASDIC; Type 285 gunnery radar; Type 286 radar surface-search radar
- Armament: 3 × twin QF 4.7-inch (120 mm) Mk XII guns; 1 × single QF 4-inch Mk V (102 mm) AA gun; 4 × single 20 mm (0.8 in) Oerlikon AA guns; 2 × twin QF 0.5-inch (12.7 mm) Mk III machineguns; 1 × quintuple 21-inch (533 mm) torpedo tubes; 45 × depth charges, 1 × rack, 2 × throwers

HMAS Norman (G49/D16) was an N-class destroyer operated by the Royal Australian Navy (RAN) during World War II. Entering service in 1941, the ship was on loan from the Royal Navy.

Early in her career, Norman participated in Operation Vigorous and the Madagascar campaign, but spent most of the time between 1942 and the start of 1945 on uneventful patrols of the Indian Ocean. In January 1945, the destroyer was involved in the Burma campaign, before being transferred from the British Eastern Fleet to the British Pacific Fleet. During April and May, Norman was involved in the Battle of Okinawa, but then spent the rest of World War II as the duty destroyer at Manus Island.

Norman was returned to the Royal Navy in October 1945. The ship was not reactivated, and was broken up for scrap in 1958.

== Design and construction ==
The N-class destroyer had a displacement of 1,773 tons at standard load, and 2,550 tons at full load. Norman was 356 feet 6 inches (108.66 m) long overall and 229 feet 6 inches (69.95 m) long between perpendiculars, had a beam of 35 feet 8 inches (10.87 m), and a maximum draught of 16 feet 4 inches (4.98 m). Propulsion was provided by Admiralty 3-drum boilers connected to Parsons geared steam turbines, which provided 40,000 shaft horsepower to the ship's two propellers. Norman was capable of reaching 36 knots (67 km/h; 41 mph). The ship's company consisted of 226 officers and sailors.

The ship's armament consisted of six 4.7-inch QF Mark XII guns in three twin mounts, a single 4-inch QF Mark V gun, a 2-pounder 4-barrel Pom Pom, four 0.5-inch machine guns, four 20 mm Oerlikon anti-aircraft guns, four .303 Lewis machine guns, two Pentad torpedo launcher tube sets (with 10 torpedoes carried), two depth-charge throwers and one depth-charge chute (with 45 charges carried). The 4-inch gun was removed later in Norman's career.

The destroyer was laid down by John I. Thornycroft & Company at Southampton, England on 27 July 1939. She was launched on 30 October 1940. Norman was commissioned into the RAN on 29 September 1941; although operated as an Australian warship, the vessel remained the property of the Royal Navy. The ship takes her name from the Normans, with her ship's badge depicting a Norman warrior's helmet. She was the only N-class destroyer to be given a motto: "Cedere Nescio" or "I Know Not How To Yield". Construction cost 402,939 pounds.

== Operational history ==
The destroyer's first mission after completing sea trials in October 1941 was to deliver a British trade union delegation from Iceland to Russia. Norman then spent some time as an escort ship, then sailed to Southampton for minor modifications. At the start of 1942, the destroyer was assigned to the British Eastern Fleet. From January until May, Norman served as a convoy escort in the Indian Ocean, before being recalled to participate in the convoy escort screen for Operation Vigorous, one of two major convoys attempting to supply the island of Malta. After this, she returned to the Indian Ocean, and during September was involved in the Madagascar campaign. The destroyer spent the remainder of 1942, all of 1943, and the early part of 1944 on uneventful patrols of the Indian Ocean. In late March 1944, Norman sailed to Sydney for a two-month-long refit. This concluded in late June, and Norman returned to the Eastern Fleet.

In January 1945, Norman became involved in the campaign to free Burma from the Japanese. On 21 January, the ship helped land Indian troops on Ramree Island as part of Operation Matador, then bombarded Cheduba Island five days later prior to the landing of Royal Marines. On 1 March, the ship sailed to Australia to join the British Pacific Fleet. As part of the Pacific Fleet, Norman was involved in the Battle of Okinawa during April and May, but left before the operation's conclusion to escort the collision-damaged destroyer HMS Quilliam as she was towed to Leyte for repairs. After delivering her charge, Norman joined the United States Fifth Fleet for a short period, then sailed for Australia, arriving in Sydney on 6 June. The destroyer returned to service in early July, and was assigned to Manus Island as the general duty destroyer until the end of World War II. After the war's end, Norman sailed to Japan, but did not arrive to participate in the Japanese surrender.

The destroyer's wartime service was recognised with the battle honours "Indian Ocean 1942–44", "East Indies 1944", "Burma 1944–45", and "Okinawa 1945".

== Decommissioning and fate ==
Norman returned to Sydney in October 1945, and was decommissioned and returned to the Royal Navy in exchange for the Q-class destroyer HMAS Queenborough. Norman was not reactivated; instead, she was sold off in 1955, and in 1958 was broken up for scrap.
