= G45 =

G45 may refer to:

- List of Intel chipsets#Core 2 chipsets
- HMS Quail (G45)
- G45 Daqing–Guangzhou Expressway in China
