= Tumultuous =

Tumultuous may refer to:

- Tumultuous Petitioning Act 1661
- Tumultuous behavior, a form of disorderly conduct

== See also ==
- Tumult (disambiguation)
