= HMS Tumult =

Two ships of the Royal Navy have borne the name HMS Tumult:

- HMS Tumult (1918) was an S-class destroyer launched in 1918 and sold for scrapping in 1928.
- HMS Tumult (R11) was a T-class destroyer launched in 1942. She was converted to a Type 16 frigate between 1953 and 1954, and was scrapped in 1965.
