= HMAS Quadrant =

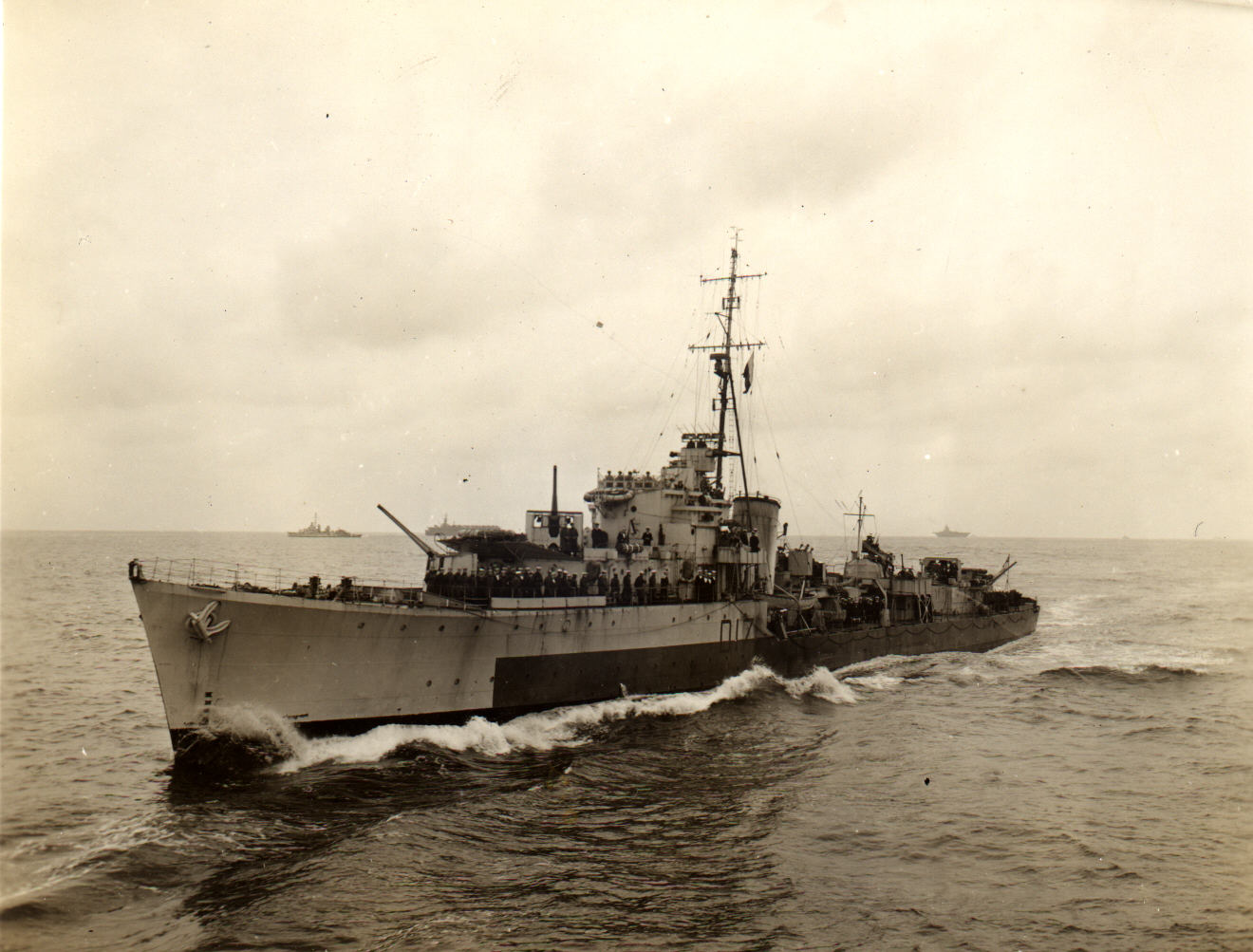
- HMS Quadrant in 1945

History

United Kingdom
- Namesake: The navigational instrument
- Builder: R. and W. Hawthorn, Leslie and Company Limited
- Laid down: 24 September 1940
- Launched: 28 February 1942
- Commissioned: 26 November 1942
- Decommissioned: Late 1945
- Honours and awards: Battle honours: Arctic 1942–3; Okinawa 1945
- Fate: Transferred to RAN

Australia
- Acquired: October 1945
- Commissioned: 18 October 1945
- Decommissioned: 20 June 1947
- Recommissioned: 16 July 1953
- Decommissioned: 16 August 1957
- Reclassified: Anti-submarine frigate (1953)
- Motto: "Seek and Smite"
- Fate: Sold for scrap
- Badge

General characteristics (as launched)
- Class & type: Q-class destroyer
- Displacement: 1,750 tons standard load; 2,388 tons full load
- Length: 358 ft 3 in (109.19 m) length overall; 339 ft 6 in (103.48 m) between perpendiculars
- Beam: 35 ft 8 in (10.87 m)
- Propulsion: 2 × Admiralty 3-drum boilers, Parsons geared turbines, 40,000 SHP, two propellers
- Speed: 31.5 knots (58.3 km/h; 36.2 mph)
- Complement: 220
- Armament: 4 × single 4.7-inch QF Mark XI** guns; 1 × quadruple 2-pounder "pom-pom"; 6 × single 20 mm Oerlikon guns; 2 × quadruple torpedo tube sets for 21 inch (533 mm) torpedoes; 4 × Depth charge throwers, up to 70 depth charges

General characteristics (post conversion)
- Type: Modified Type 15 frigate
- Draught: 15.5 ft (4.7 m)
- Range: 4,040 nautical miles (7,480 km; 4,650 mi) at 16 knots (30 km/h; 18 mph)
- Armament: 2 × 4-inch guns; 2 × 40 mm Bofors cannons; 2 × Squid anti-submarine mortars

HMAS Quadrant (G11/D11/F01), named for the navigational instrument, was a Q-class destroyer operated by the Royal Navy as HMS Quadrant (G67/D17) during World War II, and the Royal Australian Navy (RAN) from 1945 to 1957. The ship was built during the early 1940s as one of the War Emergency Programme destroyers, and entered service in 1942.

During World War II, Quadrant served as a convoy escort in the Arctic, South Atlantic, and Indian Oceans, and operated with the British Eastern and British Pacific Fleets. At the war's end, the ship was decommissioned and transferred to the RAN, which operated her for two years before placing her in reserve. In 1950, the ship was docked for conversion into an anti-submarine frigate. Quadrant was recommissioned in 1953, and operated with the RAN until 1957, when she was paid off. The ship was sold for breaking in 1963.

== Design and construction ==
Quadrant was built to the wartime Q-class design; the third flotilla of War Emergency Programme destroyers. These ships had a displacement of 1,750 tons at standard load, and 2,388 tons at full load. The destroyer was 358 feet 3 inches (109.2 m) in length overall, 339 feet 6 inches (103.5 m) long between perpendiculars, and had a beam of 35 feet 8 inches (10.9 m). Propulsion was provided by two Admiralty 3-drum boilers connected to Parsons geared turbines; these provided 40,000 shaft horsepower (30,000 kW) to the destroyer's two propellers. Quadrant could reach speeds of 31.5 knots (58.3 km/h; 36.2 mph). The ship's company consisted of 220 officers and sailors.

Quadrant's armament (at the end of World War II) consisted of four single 4.7-inch QF Mark XI** guns, a quadruple 2-pounder "pom-pom", six single 20 mm Oerlikon anti-aircraft guns, and two quadruple torpedo tube sets for 21-inch (533 mm) torpedoes. The ship was also fitted with four depth charge throwers, with up to 70 depth charges carried.

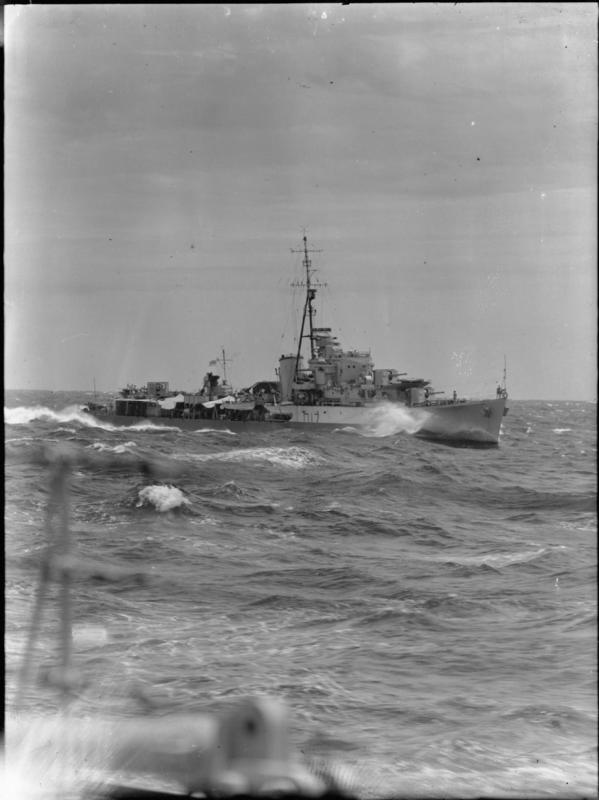
Quadrant in 1944, while operating with the British Pacific Fleet

The destroyer was laid down by R. and W. Hawthorn, Leslie and Company Limited at Hebburn-on-Tyne, England on 24 September 1940. She was launched on 28 February 1942 by the wife of one of the shipyard's directors. Quadrant was commissioned into the Royal Navy on 26 November 1942.

== Royal Navy service ==
During World War II, Quadrant served with the British Eastern and British Pacific Fleets.

Quadrant was engaged in convoy escort duties in the Arctic, South Atlantic, and Indian Oceans. She took part in the North African landings, aircraft carrier strikes against Surabaya and bombardment of the Nicobar Islands. She served with the British Pacific Fleet in 1945 where she took part in operations against Formosa (Taiwan), Okinawa, and the Japanese home islands.

== Transfer to RAN ==
Quadrant was loaned to the Royal Australian Navy (RAN) in exchange for the return of one of the N-class destroyers. Quadrant commissioned into the RAN on 18 October 1945, and was used to transport soldiers from New Guinea home to Australia. On 16 August 1947, the destroyer was paid off into reserve.

=== Frigate conversion ===
On 15 February 1950, the heavy cruiser HMAS Australia departed Sydney for Melbourne with Quadrant in tow. The vessels arrived at Melbourne on 18 February. Conversion of Quadrant to a fast anti-submarine frigate began at the Williamstown Naval Dockyard in Melbourne during April 1950.

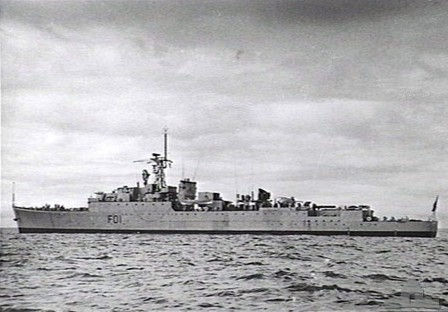
HMAS Quadrant in 1953, after conversion into a frigate

During the conversion; all of Quadrant's previous armament was stripped off, and replaced with two 4-inch guns, two 40 mm Bofors cannon, and two Squids (ahead throwing anti-submarine weapons). The conversion was completed in mid 1953, and the ship recommissioned into the RAN on 16 July.

== RAN service ==
After recommissioning, Quadrant's service was mainly in Australian waters. Quadrant escorted the Royal Yacht Gothic during the visit to Australia of Queen Elizabeth II and the Duke of Edinburgh in February 1954. Quadrant visited New Guinea, Manus, and New Britain in October 1954, New Zealand in March 1955, and spent a period on exercises in Far East waters in June 1955. In March 1956, she took part in exercises in Malayan waters. During June 1956 she served for a period as a surveillance vessel with the Japanese pearling fleet in the Arafura Sea. In October 1956, Quadrant again proceeded to the Far East for further exercises, visiting Hong Kong, Singapore, and Manila. By 1957 the frigate was already worn out and the decision to decommission the vessel was made before sister ship HMAS Quiberon's frigate conversion was complete and after the premature decommissioning HMAS Quality due to hull failure.

== Decommissioning and fate ==
Quadrant paid off at Sydney on 16 August 1957 and was sold for scrap to the Japanese firm of Kinoshita and Company Limited on 15 February 1963.
