= HMS Relentless (H85) =

R-class destroyer converted to Type 15 frigate of the Royal Navy

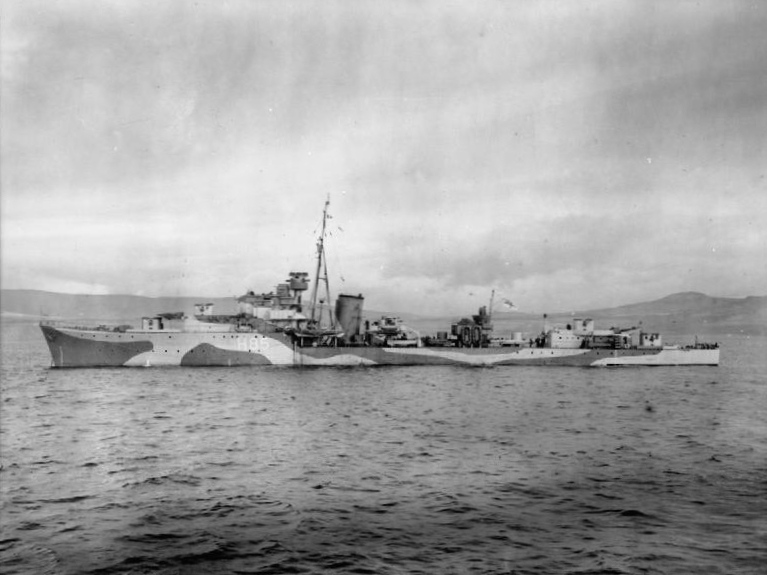
- Relentless As Built, December 1942

History

United Kingdom
- Name: HMS Relentless
- Owner: Royal Navy
- Ordered: May 1941
- Builder: John Brown & Company, Clydebank, Yard No.590
- Laid down: 20 June 1941
- Launched: 15 July 1942
- Commissioned: 30 November 1942
- Out of service: Reserve Fleet - November 1947
- Reinstated: 1952. Converted to Type 15 frigate
- Identification: Pennant number H85
- Honours and awards: SABANG 1944
- Fate: Scrapped 1971

General characteristics As R-class destroyer
- Class & type: R-class destroyer
- Displacement: 1,705 tons (1,732 tonnes); 2,425 tons (2,464 tonnes) full load
- Length: 358.25 ft (109.19 m) o/a
- Beam: 35.75 ft (10.90 m)
- Draught: 9.5 ft (2.9 m)
- Propulsion: 2 x Admiralty 3-drum water-tube boilers, Parsons geared steam turbines, 40,000 shp (30,000 kW) on 2 shafts
- Speed: 36 kn (67 km/h)
- Range: 4,675 nmi (8,658 km) at 20 knots (37 km/h)
- Complement: 176
- Sensors & processing systems: Radar Type 290 air warning; Radar Type 285 ranging & bearing
- Armament: 4 × QF 4.7-inch (120-mm) Mk.IX guns single mounts CP Mk.XVIII; 4 × QF 2 pdr Mk.VIII (40 mm L/39), quad mount Mk.VII; 2 × 2, 4 × 1 QF 20 mm Oerlikon, single mount P Mk.III; 8 (2x4) tubes for 21-inch (530 mm) torpedoes Mk.IX; 4 × throwers & 2 x racks, 70 depth charges

General characteristics As Type 15 frigate
- Displacement: 2,300 tons (standard); 2,700 tons (full load)
- Length: 358 ft (109 m) o/a
- Beam: 37.75 ft (11.51 m)
- Draught: 14.5 ft (4.4 m)
- Propulsion: 2 × Admiralty 3-drum boilers, steam turbines on 2 shafts, 40,000 shp
- Speed: 31 kn (57 km/h) (full load)
- Range: 4,675 nmi (8,658 km) at 20 knots (37 km/h)
- Complement: 174
- Sensors & processing systems: Radar; Type 293Q target indication.; Type 277Q surface search; Type 974 navigation; Type 262 fire control on director CRBF; Type 1010 Cossor Mark 10 IFF; Sonar: Type 174 search; Type 162 target classification; Type 170 attack
- Armament: 1 × twin 4 in gun Mark 19; 1 × twin 40mm Bofors Mk.5; 2 × Limbo Mark 10 A/S mortar

HMS Relentless was an R-class destroyer of the Royal Navy that saw service during World War II. She was later converted into a Type 15 fast anti-submarine frigate, with the new pennant number F185.

== History ==
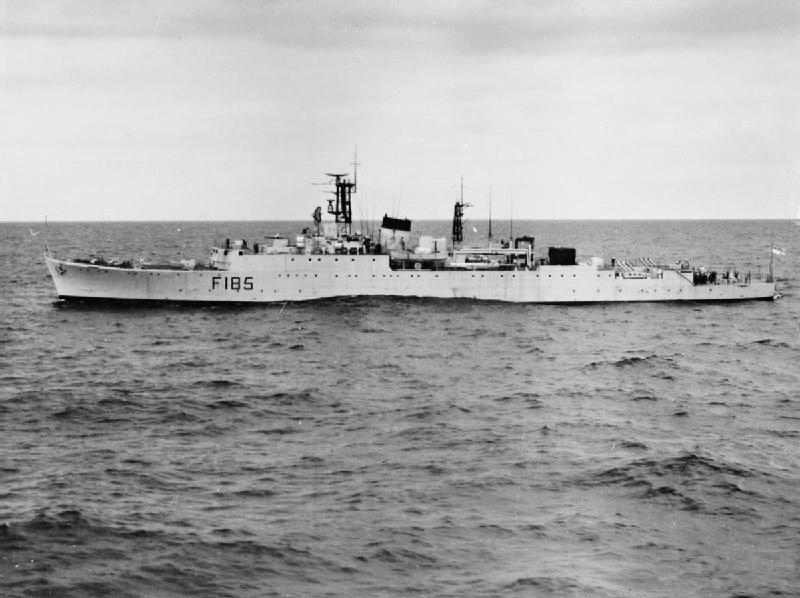
HMS Relentless (F185) after her conversion to a Type 15 frigate.

Commissioned at Greenock on 30 November 1942, Relentless performed anti-submarine escort duties and patrolling activities in the South Atlantic and Indian Ocean for the balance of the war.

From 1946 until 1949 Relentless was held in reserve at Chatham and then Harwich. From 1949 until 1951 she underwent conversion to a Type 15 Anti-Submarine Frigate. In 1951–1952 she was the leader of the 3rd Training Squadron. In 1953 she took part in the Fleet Review to celebrate the Coronation of Queen Elizabeth II.

In 1954 she was involved in a serious collision with the destroyer Vigilant. From October 1956 until 1964 she was held in reserve at Gareloch, Chatham and Rosyth.

On 27 June 1964 she was re-commissioned to serve as part of the 29th Escort Squadron, to replace the destroyer Diana.

== Decommissioning and disposal ==
Relentless was placed on the disposal list in August 1965 and was sold to Thos. W. Ward for scrapping at Inverkeithing in 1971.

== Commanding officers ==
The Commanding Officer from 1951 to 1952 was Captain Michael Le Fanu RN.

== Publications ==
- Colledge, J. J.; Warlow, Ben (2006) [1969]. Ships of the Royal Navy: The Complete Record of All Fighting Ships of the Royal Navy from the 15th Century to the Present (3rd Rev ed.). London: Chatham Publishing. ISBN 978-1-86176-281-8. OCLC 67375475.
- English, John (2001). Obdurate to Daring: British Fleet Destroyers 1941–45. Windsor, UK: World Ship Society. ISBN 978-0-9560769-0-8.
- Friedman, Norman (2006). British Destroyers & Frigates: The Second World War and After. Annapolis, Maryland: Naval Institute Press. ISBN 1-86176-137-6.
- Lenton, H. T. (1998). British & Empire Warships of the Second World War. Annapolis, Maryland: Naval Institute Press. ISBN 1-55750-048-7.
- Marriott, Leo, Royal Navy Destroyers Since 1945. Ian Allan, 1989. ISBN 0-7110-1817-0
- Raven, Alan & Roberts, John (1978). War Built Destroyers O to Z Classes. London: Bivouac Books. ISBN 0-85680-010-4.
- Richardson, Ian (August 2021). Osborne, Richard (ed.). "Type 15 Frigates, Part 2: Ship Histories". Warships: Marine News Supplement. 75 (8): 381–391. ISSN 0966-6958.
- Rohwer, Jürgen (2005). Chronology of the War at Sea 1939–1945: The Naval History of World War Two (Third Revised ed.). Annapolis, Maryland: Naval Institute Press. ISBN 1-59114-119-2.
- Whitley, M. J. (1988). Destroyers of World War 2. Annapolis, Maryland: Naval Institute Press. ISBN 0-87021-326-1.
