= HMS Quality =

Destroyer of the Royal Navy

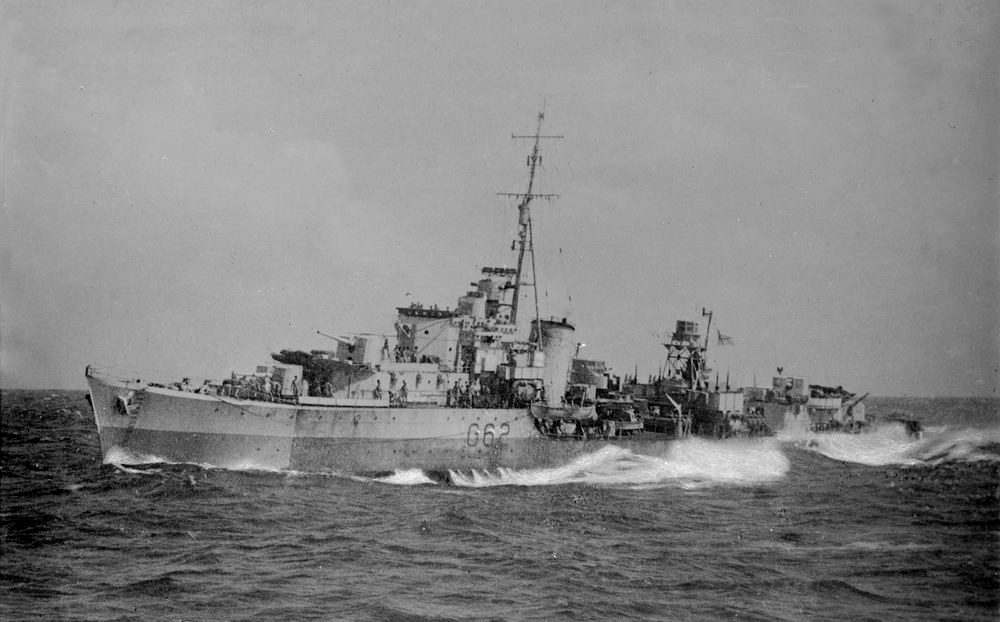
- HMS Quality (G62) on 13 May 1944

History

United Kingdom
- Name: HMS Quality
- Builder: Swan, Hunter and Wigham Richardson's Limited
- Laid down: 10 October 1940
- Launched: 6 October 1941
- Commissioned: 7 September 1942
- Decommissioned: 8 October 1945
- Motto: Age Dum Agis (Latin: Do as You Do)
- Honours and awards: Battle honours: North Africa 1942–43; Sabang 1944; Okinawa 1945; Japan 1945
- Fate: Transferred to RAN

Australia
- Name: HMAS Quality
- Acquired: 8 October 1945
- Commissioned: 28 November 1945
- Decommissioned: 25 January 1946
- Fate: Sold for scrap 10 April 1958

General characteristics
- Class & type: Q-class destroyer
- Displacement: 1,705 tons standard; 2,424 tons deep load
- Length: 358 ft 3 in (109.19 m) length overall; 339 ft 6 in (103.48 m) between perpendiculars
- Beam: 35 ft 8 in (10.87 m)
- Propulsion: 2 Admiralty 3-drum boilers, Parsons Impulse turbines, 40,000 shp (30,000 kW)
- Speed: 31.5 knots (58.3 km/h; 36.2 mph)
- Range: 4,680 nautical miles (8,670 km; 5,390 mi) at 20 knots (37 km/h; 23 mph)
- Complement: 8 officers, 181 sailors
- Armament: 4 × QF 4.7 inch Mk IX guns; 1 × quadruple 2-pounder pom-pom; 6 × 20 mm Oerlikon guns; 4 × depth charge throwers; 2 × quadruple 21 inch (533 mm) torpedo tube sets

HMS Quality (G62/D18) was a Q-class destroyer built for the Royal Navy. Entering service in 1942, the destroyer served in several theatres of World War II. Following the war's conclusion, the ship was transferred to the Royal Australian Navy (RAN), commissioning as HMAS Quality (G62/D262) in late 1945. Unlike her sister ships, which were refitted as anti-submarine frigates, Quality was not modified, decommissioned after only 59 days of service, and was sold for scrap in 1958.

== Design and construction ==
Quality was one of eight Q-class destroyers constructed as a flotilla under the War Emergency Programme. These ships had a standard displacement of 1,705 tons, and a deep load displacement of 2,424 tons. They were 358 feet 3 inches (109.19 m) long overall, and 339 feet 6 inches (103.48 m) long between perpendiculars, with a beam of 35 feet 8 inches (10.87 m). Propulsion was provided by two Admiralty 3-drum boilers connected to Parsons Impulse turbines, which generated 40,000 shaft horsepower (30,000 kW) for the propeller shafts. The destroyers had a maximum speed of 31.5 knots (58.3 km/h; 36.2 mph), and a range of 4,680 nautical miles (8,670 km; 5,390 mi) at 20 knots (37 km/h; 23 mph). The ship's company consisted of 8 officers and 181 sailors.

Main armament consisted of four QF 4.7 inch Mk IX guns in single turrets. This was supplemented by a quadruple 2-pounder pom-pom, and six 20 mm Oerlikon anti-aircraft guns. Four depth-charge throwers were fitted, with a payload of 70 charges carried, and two quadruple 21-inch torpedo tube sets were fitted, although a maximum of eight torpedoes were carried.

Quality was laid down by Swan Hunter & Wigham Richardson Limited at their Wallsend-on-Tyne shipyard on 10 October 1940. The destroyer was launched by the wife of the shipyard overseer on 6 October 1941. The destroyer was commissioned into the Royal Navy on 7 September 1942. Although commissioned as a Royal Navy vessel, a large portion of the ship's company were on loan from the RAN. Like all ships in the class, Quality was given a name starting with "Q": the ship's badge depicts an ingot of gold stamped with the Hallmarks of Quality from the assay offices at London and Edinburgh.

== Operational history ==
=== World War II ===
During World War II, the destroyer operated in the Atlantic Ocean, the Mediterranean, and the Indian Ocean. The destroyer was transferred to the British Pacific Fleet in 1945.

On 25 July 1944 Quality took part in Operation Crimson which was the naval bombardment and aerial strikes on Japanese airfields in the Indonesian cities of Sabang, Lhoknga and Kutaraja. At 0515, Quality along with the destroyers HMS Quilliam, HMS Quickmatch and the Dutch light cruiser HNLMS Tromp entered the harbour at Sabang and subsequently shelled and torpedoed Japanese positions and ships along the coast and quay. Quality was hit at 0711 by 3-inch anti-aircraft shell which exploded in the rigging, causing damage to the after-bridge, mast and HA Director. Quality suffered eight casualties, one of which proved fatal, a British Movietone news cameraman who was filming on board at the time.

Quality was awarded four battle honours for her wartime service: "North Africa 1942–43", "Sabang 1944", "Okinawa 1945", and "Japan 1945".

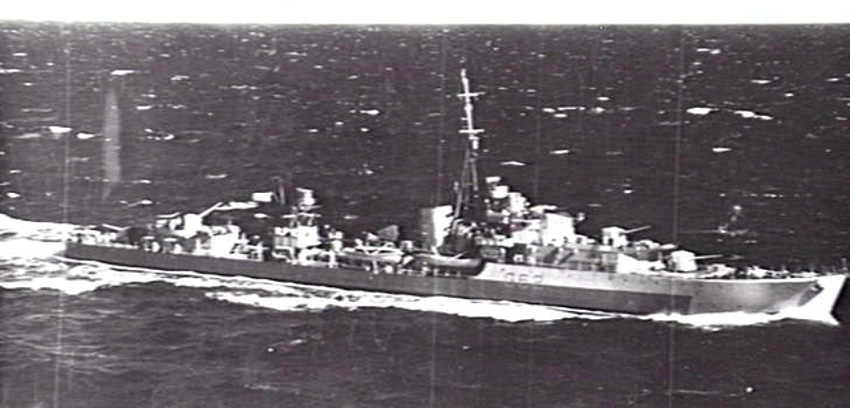
HMAS Quality during her short RAN service

=== Transfer to RAN ===
On 8 October 1945, Quality became one of five Q-class ships transferred to the RAN on loan. The transfer allowed the return of four N-class destroyers to the RN. Quality was transferred on 8 October 1945, and commissioned into the RAN on 28 November. The ship spent most of her short career in Australian waters, apart from visits to Manus Island and New Guinea.

== Decommissioning and fate ==
Quality paid off into reserve on 25 January 1946, 59 days after commissioning. The destroyer was to be converted into an anti-submarine frigate: to facilitate this, Quality and her four sister ships were gifted to the RAN in May 1950. Quality was designated as the last of the five ships to undergo the conversion. While waiting for conversion, the destroyer underwent refits in 1948 and 1950, and had to be docked for repairs to her hull in 1954. On 14 August 1956, one of the reserve fleet shipkeepers noticed that Quality was sitting lower in the water than normal. It was discovered that the hull had become corroded at the waterline, with the ship taking on water. Quality underwent an emergency dry docking that day at Garden Island, with the superstructure cut off to increase the ship's freeboard.

The deterioration of the ship while waiting for modernisation, combined with post-World War II reductions in RAN personnel numbers, the increases in both time and cost for the other four Q-class conversions, and the need for the RAN to cut back spending in order to support the navy's new aircraft carriers, meant that the conversion of Quality was cancelled and the ship was marked for disposal. Quality was sold for scrap to the Mitsubishi Company of Japan on 10 April 1958 for breaking up as scrap. The ship's bell was donated to a school in Nowra, New South Wales.
