= HMS Redoubt (H41) =

Destroyer of the Royal Navy

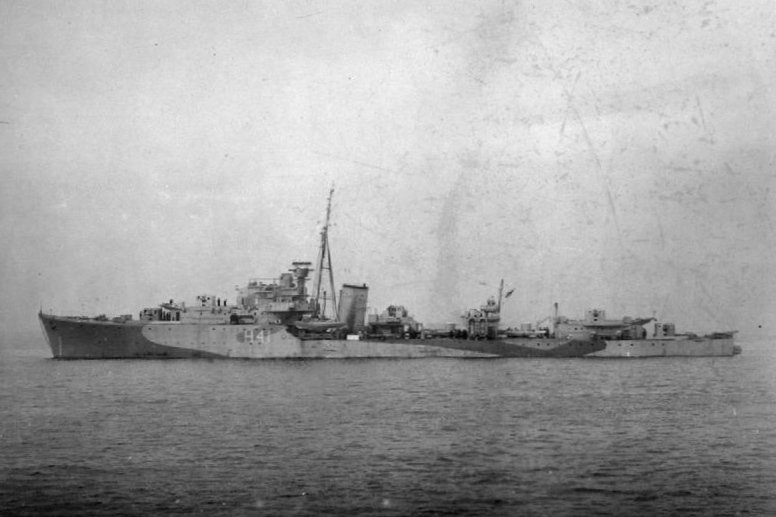
- Redoubt in November 1942

History

United Kingdom
- Name: HMS Redoubt
- Namesake: The redoubt
- Ordered: April 1940
- Builder: John Brown & Company
- Laid down: 19 June 1941
- Launched: 2 May 1942
- Commissioned: 1 October 1942
- Fate: Transferred to the Indian Navy in 1949

India
- Name: INS Ranjit
- Commissioned: 1949
- Decommissioned: 1979

General characteristics
- Class & type: R-class destroyer
- Displacement: 1,705 long tons (1,732 t) (standard); 2,425 long tons (2,464 t) (deep load)
- Length: 358 ft 3 in (109.2 m) (o/a)
- Beam: 35 ft 8 in (10.9 m)
- Draught: 13 ft 6 in (4.1 m) (deep)
- Installed power: 40,000 shp (30,000 kW); 2 × Admiralty 3-drum boilers
- Propulsion: 2 × shafts; 2 × Parsons geared steam turbines
- Speed: 36 knots (67 km/h; 41 mph)
- Range: 4,675 nmi (8,658 km; 5,380 mi) at 20 knots (37 km/h; 23 mph)
- Complement: 176
- Sensors & processing systems: Radar Type 290 air warning; Radar Type 285 ranging & bearing
- Armament: 5 × single QF 4.7-inch (120 mm) Mk.IX guns; 1 × quadruple QF 2-pdr Mk.VIII AA guns; 6 × single QF 20 mm Oerlikon AA guns; 2 × quadruple 21-inch torpedo tubes; 4 × throwers and 2 × racks for 70 depth charges

HMS Redoubt was an R-class destroyer built for the Royal Navy during the Second World War.

== Description ==
Redoubt displaced 1,705 long tons (1,732 t) at standard load and 2,425 long tons (2,464 t) at deep load. She had an overall length of 358 feet 3 inches (109.2 m), a beam of 33 feet 8 inches (10.3 m) and a deep draught of 13 feet 6 inches (4.1 m). She was powered by two Parsons geared steam turbines, each driving one propeller shaft, using steam provided by two Admiralty three-drum boilers. The turbines developed a total of 40,000 shaft horsepower (30,000 kW) and gave a maximum speed of 36 knots (67 km/h; 41 mph). Redoubt carried a maximum of 470 long tons (480 t) of fuel oil that gave her a range of 4,675 nautical miles (8,658 km; 5,380 mi) at 20 knots (37 km/h; 23 mph). Her complement was 176 officers and ratings.

The ship was armed with four 45-calibre 4.7-inch (120 mm) Mark IX guns in single mounts. For anti-aircraft (AA) defence, Redoubt had one quadruple mount for QF 2-pdr Mark VIII ("pom-pom") guns and six single 20-millimetre (0.8 in) Oerlikon autocannon. She was fitted with two above-water quadruple mounts for 21-inch (533 mm) torpedoes. Two depth charge rails and four throwers were fitted for which 70 depth charges were provided.

== Construction and career ==
HMS Redoubt was built by Clydebank and launched in 1942.

== Postwar service ==
Between 1946 and 1947 Redoubt was part of the reserve held at Chatham Dockyard, being transferred to the Harwich reserve in August 1947. Between 1948 and 1949 she underwent a refit at Chatham Dockyard. She was transferred to India 4 July 1949, where she was commissioned as INS Ranjit and allocated the pennant number D209.

In 1953 she took part in the Fleet Review to celebrate the Coronation of Queen Elizabeth II Along with two other former R-class destroyers (Rajput and Rana) she formed part of the 11th destroyer Squadron.

In 1970, the Submarne INS Karanj was badly damaged after a collision with the destroyer Ranjit when she surfaced directly below the ship. Ranjit was undamaged and following a refit participated in the Indo-Pakistani War of 1971.

She served until 1979, and was scrapped after decommissioning.

== Bibliography ==
- Chesneau, Roger, ed. (1980). Conway's All the World's Fighting Ships 1922–1946. Greenwich, UK: Conway Maritime Press. ISBN 0-85177-146-7.
- Colledge, J. J.; Warlow, Ben (2006) [1969]. Ships of the Royal Navy: The Complete Record of All Fighting Ships of the Royal Navy from the 15th Century to the Present (3rd Rev ed.). London: Chatham Publishing. ISBN 978-1-86176-281-8. OCLC 67375475.
- English, John (2001). Obdurate to Daring: British Fleet Destroyers 1941–45. Windsor, UK: World Ship Society. ISBN 978-0-9560769-0-8.
- Friedman, Norman (2006). British Destroyers & Frigates: The Second World War and After. Annapolis, Maryland: Naval Institute Press. ISBN 1-86176-137-6.
- Lenton, H. T. (1998). British & Empire Warships of the Second World War. Annapolis, Maryland: Naval Institute Press. ISBN 1-55750-048-7.
- Raven, Alan & Roberts, John (1978). War Built Destroyers O to Z Classes. London: Bivouac Books. ISBN 0-85680-010-4.
- Rohwer, Jürgen (2005). Chronology of the War at Sea 1939–1945: The Naval History of World War Two (Third Revised ed.). Annapolis, Maryland: Naval Institute Press. ISBN 1-59114-119-2.
- Whitley, M. J. (1988). Destroyers of World War 2. Annapolis, Maryland: Naval Institute Press. ISBN 0-87021-326-1.
