= HMS Raider (H15) =

British destroyer

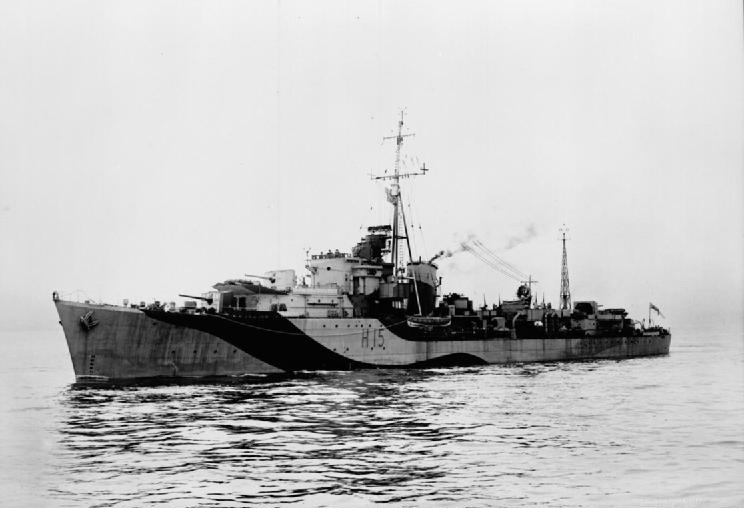
- Raider in November 1942

History

United Kingdom
- Name: HMS Raider
- Builder: Cammell Laird & Company
- Launched: 1942
- Commissioned: 16 November 1942
- Identification: Pennant number H15
- Fate: Sold to India 1948

India
- Name: INS Rana
- Acquired: 1948
- Commissioned: 1949
- Decommissioned: 1976
- Identification: D115
- Fate: Scrapped

General characteristics
- Class & type: R-class destroyer
- Displacement: 1,705 long tons (1,732 t) (standard); 2,425 long tons (2,464 t) (deep load)
- Length: 358 ft 3 in (109.2 m) (o/a)
- Beam: 35 ft 8 in (10.9 m)
- Draught: 13 ft 6 in (4.1 m) (deep)
- Installed power: 40,000 shp (30,000 kW); 2 × Admiralty 3-drum boilers
- Propulsion: 2 × shafts; 2 × Parsons geared steam turbines
- Speed: 36 knots (67 km/h; 41 mph)
- Range: 4,675 nmi (8,658 km; 5,380 mi) at 20 knots (37 km/h; 23 mph)
- Complement: 176
- Sensors & processing systems: Radar Type 290 air warning; Radar Type 285 ranging & bearing
- Armament: 5 × single QF 4.7-inch (120 mm) Mk.IX guns; 1 × quadruple QF 2-pdr Mk.VIII AA guns; 6 × single QF 20 mm Oerlikon AA guns; 2 × quadruple 21-inch torpedo tubes; 4 × throwers and 2 × racks for 70 depth charges

HMS Raider was a R-class destroyer built for the Royal Navy during the Second World War.

== Description ==
Raider displaced 1,705 long tons (1,732 t) at standard load and 2,425 long tons (2,464 t) at deep load. She had an overall length of 358 feet 3 inches (109.2 m), a beam of 33 feet 8 inches (10.3 m) and a deep draught of 13 feet 6 inches (4.1 m). She was powered by two Parsons geared steam turbines, each driving one propeller shaft, using steam provided by two Admiralty three-drum boilers. The turbines developed a total of 40,000 shaft horsepower (30,000 kW) and gave a maximum speed of 36 knots (67 km/h; 41 mph). Raider carried a maximum of 470 long tons (480 t) of fuel oil that gave her a range of 4,675 nautical miles (8,658 km; 5,380 mi) at 20 knots (37 km/h; 23 mph). Her complement was 176 officers and ratings.

The ship was armed with four 45-calibre 4.7-inch (120 mm) Mark IX guns in single mounts. For anti-aircraft (AA) defence, Raider had one quadruple mount for QF 2-pdr Mark VIII ("pom-pom") guns and six single 20-millimetre (0.8 in) Oerlikon autocannon. She was fitted with two quadruple mounts for 21-inch (533 mm) torpedoes on the superstructure. Two depth charge rails and four throwers were fitted for which 70 depth charges were provided.

== Construction and career ==
HMS Raider was adopted by Romford during World War II as part of Warship Week. She was launched on 1 April 1942 as the second Royal Navy ship to carry the name, previously borne by a destroyer built in 1916 and sold in 1927.

== Postwar service ==
Raider was placed in Reserve at Devonport in January 1946 and was recommissioned for service in the Mediterranean on 6 May that year. The ship was extensively deployed for Plane Guard duties with aircraft carriers and took part in Fleet exercises. She returned to UK in August 1947 and reduced to Reserve status.

She was subsequently sold to the Indian Navy in 1948, where she was commissioned in 1949 as INS Rana (D115). Along with two other former R-class destroyers (Rajput and Ranjit) she formed part of the 11th destroyer Squadron. She was decommissioned in 1976, and scrapped in 1979.

== Bibliography ==
- Chesneau, Roger, ed. (1980). Conway's All the World's Fighting Ships 1922–1946. Greenwich, UK: Conway Maritime Press. ISBN 0-85177-146-7.
- Colledge, J. J.; Warlow, Ben (2006) [1969]. Ships of the Royal Navy: The Complete Record of All Fighting Ships of the Royal Navy from the 15th Century to the Present (3rd Rev ed.). London: Chatham Publishing. ISBN 978-1-86176-281-8. OCLC 67375475.
- English, John (2001). Obdurate to Daring: British Fleet Destroyers 1941–45. Windsor, UK: World Ship Society. ISBN 978-0-9560769-0-8.
- Friedman, Norman (2006). British Destroyers & Frigates: The Second World War and After. Annapolis, Maryland: Naval Institute Press. ISBN 1-86176-137-6.
- Lenton, H. T. (1998). British & Empire Warships of the Second World War. Annapolis, Maryland: Naval Institute Press. ISBN 1-55750-048-7.
- Raven, Alan & Roberts, John (1978). War Built Destroyers O to Z Classes. London: Bivouac Books. ISBN 0-85680-010-4.
- Rohwer, Jürgen (2005). Chronology of the War at Sea 1939–1945: The Naval History of World War Two (Third Revised ed.). Annapolis, Maryland: Naval Institute Press. ISBN 1-59114-119-2.
- Whitley, M. J. (1988). Destroyers of World War 2. Annapolis, Maryland: Naval Institute Press. ISBN 0-87021-326-1.
