= HMAS Quickmatch =

1942 Q and R-class destroyer

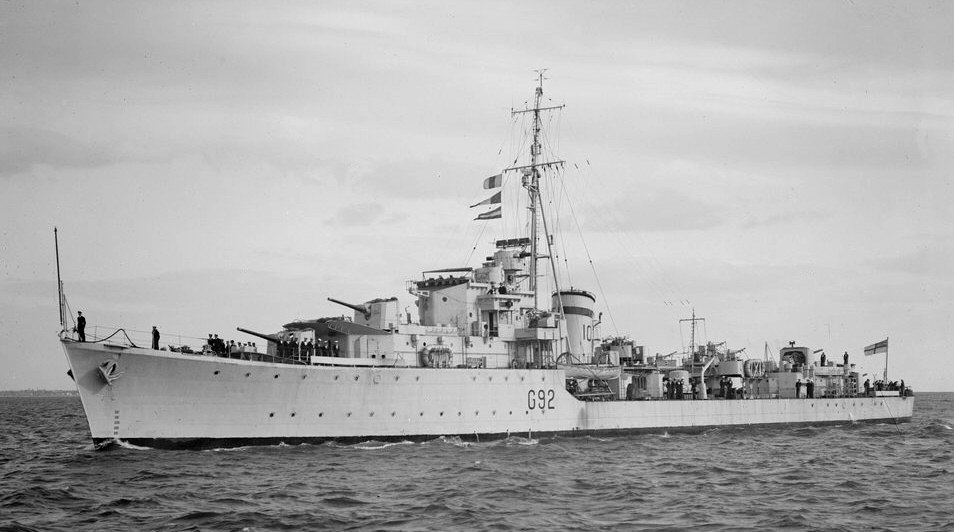
- HMAS Quickmatch in 1955

History

Australia
- Namesake: The quick match, a fast burning match used for lighting cannon
- Builder: J. Samuel White and Company
- Laid down: 6 February 1941
- Launched: 11 April 1942
- Commissioned: 14 September 1942
- Decommissioned: 15 May 1950
- Recommissioned: 23 September 1955
- Decommissioned: 26 April 1963
- Reclassified: Anti-submarine frigate (1955)
- Motto: "Swift to Strike"
- Honours and awards: Battle honours: English Channel 1942; Atlantic 1943; Indian Ocean 1943–44; Sabang 1944; Pacific 1944–45; Okinawa 1945; Malaya 1957
- Fate: Used as barracks ship until 1972, when she was sold for scrap

General characteristics (as launched)
- Class & type: Q-class destroyer
- Displacement: 1,750 tons standard; 2,420 tons deep load
- Length: 358 ft 3 in (109.19 m) length overall; 339 ft 6 in (103.48 m) between perpendiculars
- Beam: 35 ft 8 in (10.87 m)
- Propulsion: 2 Admiralty 3-drum boilers, Parsons Impulse turbines, 40,000 shp (30,000 kW)
- Speed: 31 knots (57 km/h; 36 mph)
- Complement: 220
- Armament: 4 × QF 4.7 inch Mk IX guns; 1 × quadruple 2-pounder pom-pom; 6 × 20 mm Oerlikon guns; 4 × Depth charge throwers; 2 × quadruple 21 inch (533 mm) torpedo tube sets

HMAS Quickmatch (G92/D21/D292/F04) was a Q-class destroyer operated by the Royal Australian Navy (RAN). Although commissioned into the RAN in 1942, the ship was initially the property of the Royal Navy. Quickmatch served with both the British Eastern Fleet and British Pacific Fleet during World War II. In the 1950s, the destroyer was converted into an anti-submarine frigate. In 1957, Quickmatch operated in support of Malaya during the Malayan Emergency. The ship remained in service until 1963, and after use as an accommodation ship, was sold for scrap in 1972.

== Design and construction ==
Quickmatch was one of eight Q-class destroyers constructed as a flotilla under the War Emergency Programme. She had a standard displacement of 1,750 tons, and a deep load displacement of 2,420 tons. Quickmatch was 358 feet 3 inches (109.19 m) long overall, and 339 feet 6 inches (103.48 m) long between perpendiculars, with a beam of 35 feet 8 inches (10.87 m). Propulsion was provided by two Admiralty 3-drum boilers connected to Parsons Impulse turbines, which generated 40,000 shaft horsepower (30,000 kW) for the propeller shafts. Quickmatch had a maximum speed of 31 knots (57 km/h; 36 mph). The ship's company consisted of 220 officers and sailors.

The ship's main armament consisted of four QF 4.7 inch Mk IX guns in single turrets. This was supplemented by a quadruple 2-pounder pom-pom, and six 20 mm Oerlikon anti-aircraft guns. Four depth-charge throwers were fitted, with a payload of 70 charges carried, and two quadruple 21 inch (533 mm) torpedo tube sets were fitted, although a maximum of eight torpedoes were carried.

The ship was laid down by J. Samuel White and Company Limited at their shipyard in Cowes, on the Isle of Wight, on 6 February 1941. She was launched on 11 April 1942 by the wife of the company's deputy chairman. Quickmatch was commissioned into the RAN on 14 September 1942. Despite being commissioned into the RAN, Quickmatch remained the property of the British government until the early 1950s, when she was gifted to the RAN. The ship's name came from the quick match, a fast burning match used for lighting cannon.

== Operational history ==
=== World War II ===
From October 1942, Quickmatch operated as a convoy escort vessel; initially in British waters, then in the South Atlantic, then in the Indian Ocean. In July 1943, the ship rescued survivors from Jasper Park, that was sunk by U-boat U-177. While in the Indian Ocean, the ship was assigned to a force dedicated to covering convoys between the Gulf of Aden and India. In May 1944, the destroyer joined the British Eastern Fleet. Shortly after, the destroyer formed part of the carrier screen during Operation Transom, an air raid on Japanese-held Surabaya. This role was repeated in June during an air attack on the Andaman Islands.

In October, Quickmatch arrived in Australia for a refit. After this, she remained in Australian waters until March 1945, when she was reassigned to the British Pacific Fleet. As part of this force, Quickmatch took part in operations in support of the American seizure of Okinawa and attacks on the Japanese home islands. The ship received six battle honours for her wartime service: "English Channel 1942", "Atlantic 1943", "Indian Ocean 1943–44", "Sabang 1944", "Pacific 1944–45", and "Okinawa 1945".

=== Post-war and frigate conversion ===
Over the following years, Quickmatch made several deployments to Japanese and Korean waters, with the rest of her time spent operating around Australia. On 15 May 1950, Quickmatch paid off for a major refit in which she was converted to an anti-submarine frigate at Williamstown Naval Dockyard in Victoria. She was recommissioned on 23 September 1955. Afterwards, she was deployed to Singapore as part of Australia's contribution to the Far East Strategic Reserve. In 1957, Quickmatch operated in support of British Commonwealth forces deployed during the Malayan Emergency, for which she was later awarded her seventh battle honour, "Malaya 1957".

Quickmatch, along with HMS Cavendish rescued survivors when the stores vessel HMAS Woomera exploded and sank off Sydney Heads on 11 October 1960.

On 10 November 1960 Quickmatch rescued the crew of an Indonesian Proa with failed engines near Singapore.

== Decommissioning and fate ==
Quickmatch performed routine duties until she paid off to reserve at Williamstown on 26 April 1963. After paying off she served as an accommodation ship until she was sold for scrap to the Fujita Salvage Company Limited of Osaka in Japan on 15 February 1972. The ship departed Melbourne for Japan under tow on 6 July 1972.
