= Q and R-class destroyer =

Class of 16 British destroyers, ordered in 1940

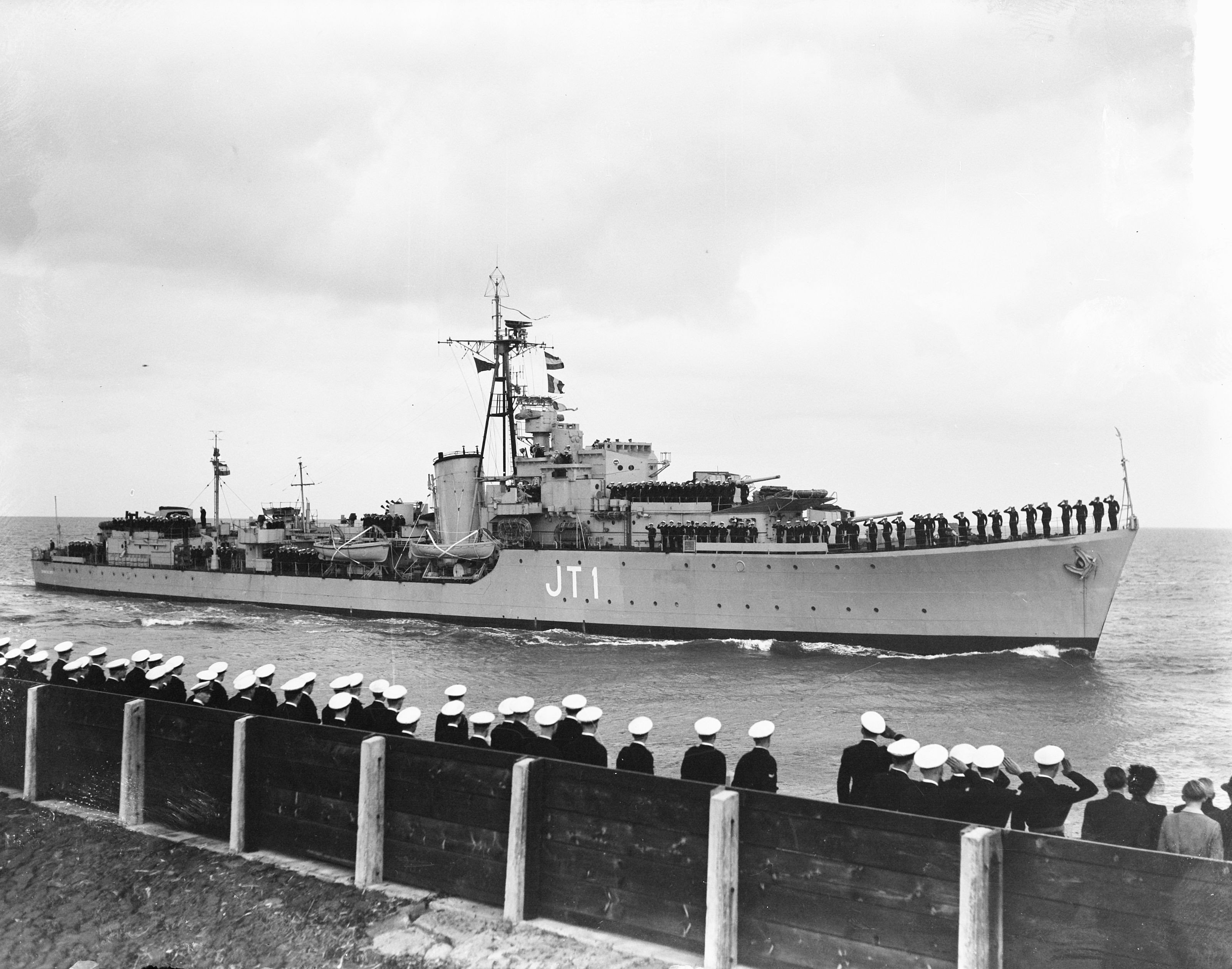
- HNLMS Banckert on 20 September 1948

Class overview
- Operators: Royal Navy; Royal Australian Navy; Royal Netherlands Navy; Indian Navy
- Preceded by: O and P class
- Succeeded by: S and T class
- Subclasses: Q, R
- Completed: 16
- Lost: 2 (+1 expended)
- Retired: 13

General characteristics Q class
- Type: Destroyer
- Displacement: 1,692 long tons (1,719 t); 2,411 long tons (2,450 t) full load
- Length: 358.25 ft (109.2 m) o/a
- Beam: 35.75 ft (10.9 m)
- Draught: 9.5 ft (2.9 m)
- Propulsion: 2 × Admiralty three-drum boilers, Parsons geared steam turbines, 40,000 shp (30,000 kW) on 2 shafts
- Speed: 36 kn (67 km/h)
- Range: 4,675 nmi (8,658 km) at 20 knots (37 km/h)
- Complement: 176 (225 as flotilla leader)
- Sensors & processing systems: Radar Type 290 air warning; Radar Type 285 ranging & bearing
- Armament: 4 × QF 4.7 in (120 mm) Mk.IX guns, single mounts CP Mk.XVIII; 4 × QF 2 pdr Mk.VIII (40 mm L/39), quad mount Mk.VII; 6 × QF 20 mm Oerlikon, single mount P Mk.III; 8 (2×4) tubes for 21 in (533 mm) torpedoes Mk.IX; up to 3 × throwers & 3 × racks, to 45 depth charges

General characteristics (R class)
- Displacement: 1,705 long tons (1,732 t); 2,425 long tons (2,464 t) full load
- Complement: 176 (237 in leader)
- Armament: 4 × throwers & 2 × racks, 70 depth charges
- Notes: Other characteristics as per Q class

The Q and R class was a class of sixteen War Emergency Programme destroyers ordered for the British Royal Navy in 1940 as the 3rd and 4th Emergency Flotilla. They served as convoy escorts during World War II. Three Q-class ships were transferred to the Royal Australian Navy upon completion, with two further ships being handed over in 1945. Roebuck had the dubious honour of being launched prematurely by an air raid at Scotts shipyard in Greenock, her partially complete hulk lying submerged in the dockyard for nine months before it was salvaged and completed.

== Design ==
The Q and R class were repeats of the preceding O and P class, but reverted to the larger J-, K- and N-class hull to allow for the inevitable growth in topweight. As they had fewer main guns than the J, K and Ns, some magazine space was replaced by fuel bunkers, allowing some 4,675 nautical miles (8,658 km) to be made at 20 knots (37 km/h), rather than the 3,700 nmi (6,900 km) of their predecessors. Like the O and Ps, they were armed with what weapons were available: 4.7-inch (119 mm) guns on single mountings that allowed only 40° elevation, which do not compare favourably on paper with many contemporaries. These ships used the Fuze Keeping Clock HA Fire Control Computer.

In the Q class, 'Y' gun could be removed, allowing additional depth charges and projectors, or minesweeps, to be carried.

The R class were repeats of the Qs, except that the officers' accommodation was moved from its traditional location right aft to the more accessible location amidships. This facilitated the change in watchkeepers in inclement weather; the main deck of a destroyer would often be entirely awash in heavy seas, and catwalks were not fitted to connect fore and aft until the V class ordered in 1941.

In surviving ships, the single 20 mm Oerlikon guns in the bridge wings were later replaced by hydraulically operated Mark V twin mountings. Rotherham, Raider and Rocket later had the Oerlikons and searchlight amidships replaced by four single QF 40 mm Bofors. The searchlight was later reinstated at the cost of depth charge stowage. Raider only had an additional pair of twin Mark V Oerlikon mounts added on the after shelter deck. Radar Type 290 was replaced by Type 291, and later by Type 293 in some ships. The centimetric wavelength Type 272 set was added on a platform between the torpedo tubes in Rotherham, Racehorse, Rapid, Raider and Roebuck, or at the foremast truck in other ships. Racehorse, Raider, Rapid, Redoubt and Relentless had Huff-Duff (High-frequency Direction-finder) added on a lattice mainmast.

== Ships ==
=== Q class ===
Construction data
| Name | Pennant number | Builder | Laid down | Launched | Commissioned | Fate |
|---|---|---|---|---|---|---|
| Queenborough | G70 | Swan Hunter, Wallsend | 6 November 1940 | 16 January 1942 | 15 September 1942 | To Royal Australian Navy as HMAS Queenborough 1945, later converted to Type 15 frigate, sold for scrapping 1975 |
| Quadrant | G11/G67 | Hawthorn Leslie, Hebburn | 24 September 1940 | 28 February 1942 | 26 November 1942 | To Australia as HMAS Quadrant 1945, later converted to Type 15 frigate, sold for scrapping 1962 |
| Quail | G45 | Hawthorn Leslie, Hebburn | 30 September 1940 | 1 June 1942 | 7 January 1943 | Mined off Bari 15 November 1943, foundered under tow en route for Taranto 18 June 1944 |
| Quality | G62 | Swan Hunter, Wallsend | 10 October 1940 | 6 October 1941 | 7 September 1942 | To Australia as HMAS Quality 1945, sold for scrapping 1958 |
| Quentin | G78 | J. Samuel White, Cowes | 25 September 1940 | 5 November 1941 | 15 April 1942 | Torpedoed and sunk by Italian aircraft off Galita Island 2 December 1942 |
| Quiberon | G81 | J. Samuel White, Cowes | 14 October 1940 | 31 January 1942 | 6 July 1942 | Later converted to Type 15 frigate To Australia as HMAS Quiberon (G81) 1945, sold for scrapping 1972 |
| Quickmatch | G92 | J. Samuel White, Cowes | 6 February 1941 | 11 April 1942 | 14 September 1942 | Later converted to Type 15 frigate To Australia as HMAS Quickmatch (G92) 1945, sold for scrapping 1972 |
| Quilliam (Note: flotilla leader) | G09 | Hawthorn Leslie, Hebburn | 19 August 1940 | 29 November 1941 | 22 October 1942 | To Royal Netherlands Navy as HNLMS Banckert 1945, sold for scrapping 1957 |

=== R class ===
Construction data
| Name | Pennant number | Builder | Laid down | Launched | Commissioned | Fate |
|---|---|---|---|---|---|---|
| Rotherham (Note: flotilla leader) | H09 | John Brown, Clydebank | 10 April 1941 | 21 March 1942 | August 1942 | To Indian Navy as Rajput 1949; scrapped 1976 |
| Racehorse | H11 | John Brown, Clydebank | 25 June 1941 | 1 June 1942 | 30 October 1942 | Sold for scrapping 1949 |
| Raider | H15 | Cammel Laird, Birkenhead | 16 April 1941 | 1 April 1942 | 16 November 1942 | To India as Rana 1949 |
| Rapid | H32 | Cammel Laird, Birkenhead | 16 June 1941 | 16 July 1942 | 20 February 1943 | Converted to Type 15 frigate 1953, expended as target 3 September 1981 |
| Redoubt | H41 | John Brown, Clydebank | 19 June 1941 | 2 May 1942 | 1 October 1942 | To India as Ranjit 1949 |
| Relentless | H85 | John Brown, Clydebank | 20 June 1941 | 15 July 1942 | 30 November 1942 | Converted to Type 15 frigate 1951, sold for scrapping 1971 |
| Rocket | H92 | Scotts, Greenock | 14 March 1941 | 28 October 1942 | 4 August 1943 | Converted to Type 15 frigate 1951, sold for scrapping 1967 |
| Roebuck | H95 | Scotts, Greenock | 19 June 1941 | 10 December 1942 | 10 June 1943 | Converted to Type 15 frigate 1953, sold for scrapping 1968 |

== See also ==
- Type 15 frigate – most surviving Q and R-class ships were given this conversion post-war.
