= HMS Quilliam =

Royal Navy destroyer

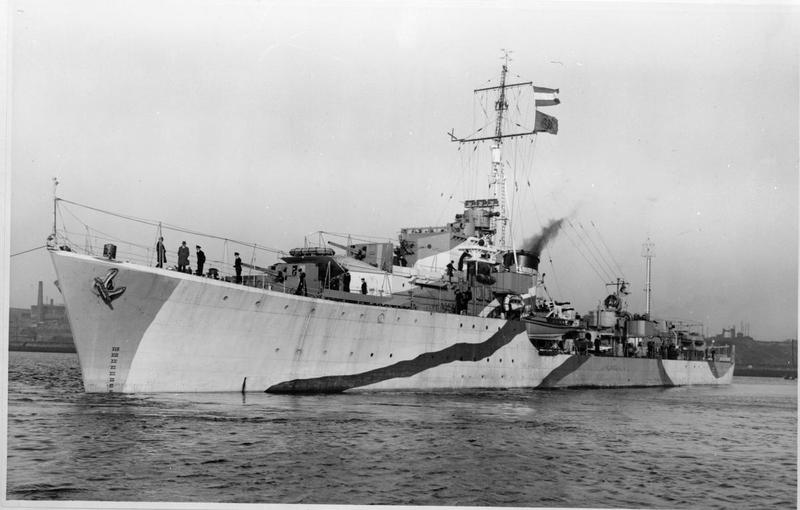

History

United Kingdom
- Name: HMS Quilliam
- Namesake: Lieutenant John Quilliam
- Builder: R. and W. Hawthorn, Leslie and Company, Limited
- Laid down: 19 August 1940
- Launched: 29 November 1941
- Commissioned: 22 October 1942
- Decommissioned: 21 November 1945
- Identification: Pennant number G09
- Fate: Transferred to the Royal Netherlands Navy

Netherlands
- Name: HNLMS Banckert
- Acquired: 21 November 1945
- Decommissioned: April 1952
- Stricken: 19 October 1956
- Identification: D801
- Fate: Sold for scrap in 1957

General characteristics
- Class & type: Q-class destroyer

HMS Quilliam (G09) was a Q-class destroyer serving in the Royal Navy from 1942 to 1945. She was then transferred to the Royal Netherlands Navy, where she was commissioned as HNLMS Banckert (D801) from until 1957.

== Construction ==
The ship was laid down by R. and W. Hawthorn, Leslie and Company, Limited, at Hebburn-on-Tyne on 19 August 1940, launched on 29 November 1941 and commissioned on 22 October 1942.

She was named after Manx Lieutenant (later Captain) John Quilliam RN, First Lieutenant of HMS Victory at the Battle of Trafalgar.

== Operational history ==
=== Royal Navy ===
Quilliam was involved in wartime operations in both the Atlantic and Pacific Oceans.

On 20 May 1945, while taking part in Operation Iceberg (the Invasion of Okinawa), Quilliam was involved in a collision with the British aircraft carrier Indomitable, which left the destroyer with a heavily damaged bow. She was out of service for repairs when World War II ended.

=== Royal Netherlands Navy ===
Quilliam was one of six Q-class destroyers to survive World War II. While five were transferred to the Royal Australian Navy, Quilliam was instead transferred to the Royal Netherlands Navy on 21 November 1945. The ship was renamed HNLMS Banckert, and received the pennant number D801. The ship was refitted to Dutch standards and had a new bow fitted before she entered service in the Netherlands East Indies.

On 11 December 1946 Banckert encountered HNLMS Karel Doorman at Tandjong Priok, during this encounter the commander of Banckert visited the Dutch escort carrier.

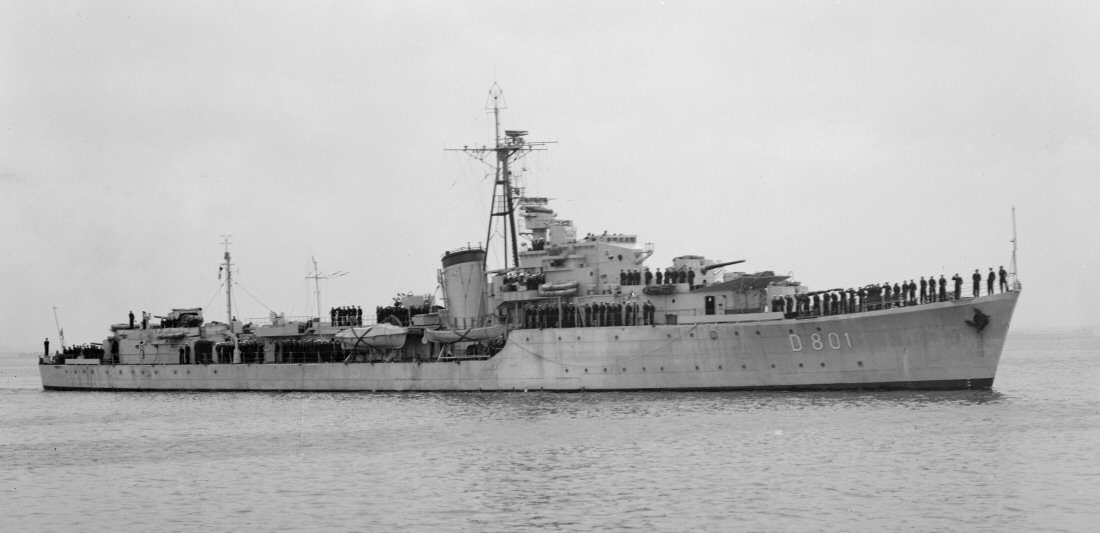
HMS Quilliam as HNLMS Banckert

Banckert saw action during the Indonesian National Revolution. Between 10 and 12 May 1947, the ship intercepted the British coastal merchant ship NR. 4 Nanmei, which was supplying contraband to Indonesians in Tapanoeli Bay, and fired on Indonesian coastal defences in Sibolga. She was involved in the Dutch occupation of Tegal on 26 July by providing a landing party. After carrying out patrols during the Dutch 'police counteractions', Banckert returned to the Netherlands in August 1948 for a refit, which lasted until 19 September 1949. The destroyer arrived at the Soerabaja naval base on 25 December 1949, and was stationed there until 9 December 1950, when she was assigned to Netherlands New Guinea. Banckert left Southeast Asia for the Netherlands on 20 August 1951.

On her return, Banckert was assigned to the naval base at Den Helder as part of the RNLN's European Training Squadron.

== Decommissioning and fate ==
Banckert was paid off in April 1952. She was struck from records on 19 October 1956, and was sold to Jos de Smedt of Antwerp for scrapping on 1 February 1957.
