= HMS Vestal (J215) =

Algerine-class minesweeper of the Royal Navy

Coordinates: 07°05′N 97°50′E

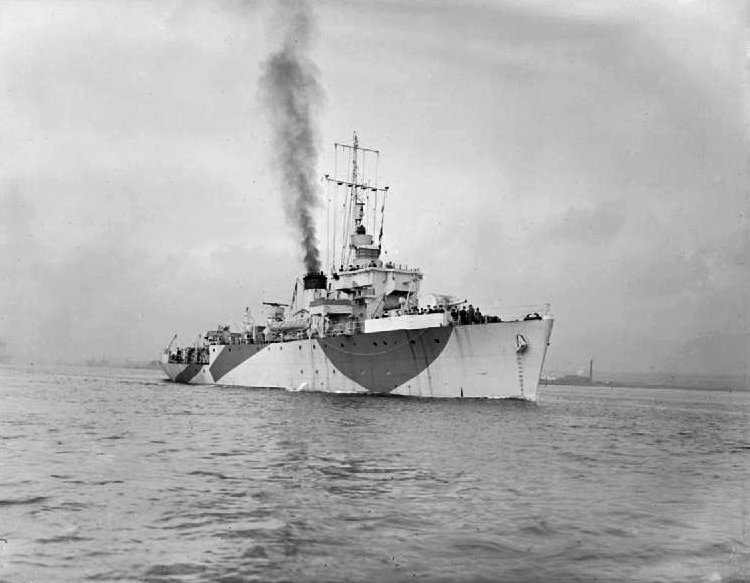

History

United Kingdom
- Name: HMS Vestal
- Builder: Harland and Wolff, Belfast
- Yard number: 1147
- Laid down: 11 January 1943
- Launched: 19 June 1943
- Completed: 10 September 1943
- Commissioned: 11 February 1944
- Identification: Pennant number: J299
- Fate: Hit by a Japanese kamikaze pilot on 26 July 1945 and subsequently scuttled
- Badge: A sacred flame which was brought to Rome by Aeneas, and was then tended to by Vesta, Goddess of the Hearth. The patch is blue; with a gold altar with a flame.

General characteristics
- Class & type: Algerine-class minesweeper
- Length: 255 ft (78 m)
- Beam: 35.5 ft (10.8 m)
- Draft: 3.50
- Propulsion: Steam Turbine
- Speed: 16.5 knots (30.6 km/h)
- Crew: 104–135
- Armament: 1 × QF 4 in (102 mm) Mk V anti-aircraft gun; 4 × 20 mm (4 x I-AA); ASW (× 4 DCT, 2 × DCR)

HMS Vestal was a turbine-powered Algerine-class minesweeper of the Royal Navy. She was launched in 1943 and saw service in the Pacific War against the Empire of Japan. She was critically damaged by Japanese kamikaze aircraft in 1945 and was subsequently scuttled in waters close to Thailand.

Vestal was the only British ship to be sunk by kamikaze attack and the last Royal Navy ship to be lost in the Second World War. She was sunk whilst partaking in Operation Livery. Vestal was commanded by Lt. Charles William Porter, DSC, from 26 July 1943 until 26 July 1945, when the ship was sunk. Her engine was provided by Paxman.

== Design and description ==
The turbine-powered group displaced 850 long tons (860 t) at standard load and 1,125 long tons (1,143 t) at deep load. The ships measured 225 feet (68.6 m) long overall with a beam of 35 feet 6 inches (10.8 m). They had a draught of 11 feet (3.4 m). The ships' complement consisted of 85 officers and ratings.

The ships had two Parsons geared steam turbines, each driving one shaft, using steam provided by two Admiralty three-drum boilers. The engines produced a total of 2,000 shaft horsepower (1,500 kW) and gave a maximum speed of 16.5 knots (30.6 km/h; 19.0 mph). They carried a maximum of 660 long tons (671 t) of fuel oil that gave them a range of 5,000 nautical miles (9,300 km; 5,800 mi) at 10 knots (19 km/h; 12 mph).

The Algerine class was armed with a QF 4 in (102 mm) Mk V anti-aircraft gun and four twin-gun mounts for Oerlikon 20 mm cannon. The latter guns were in short supply when the first ships were being completed and they often got a proportion of single mounts. By 1944, single-barrel Bofors 40 mm gun mounts began replacing the twin 20 mm mounts on a one for one basis. All of the ships were fitted for four throwers and two rails for depth charges.

== Construction ==
The ship was laid down at the Harland and Wolff yard in Belfast on 11 January 1943. She was launched on 19 June that year and commissioned on 10 September, a build time of just seven months and three days.

== Operations ==
=== 1944 ===
Vestal underwent trials until October 1944. She took part in a minesweeping exercise around Harwich with a flotilla, which was working in the Scheldt estuary. This was with the ships Pincher, Recruit, Rifleman, Plucky, Fancy, Squirrel, and Chameleon, all of which were Algerine-class minesweepers.

=== 1945 ===
Vestal was deployed as a part of the East Indies Fleet, along with Pincher, Plucky, Recruit, Pickle, Rifleman, and Chameleon. On 24 July, Squirrel hit a mine, which killed seven men. The ship was scuttled by Rotherham, and the survivors were rescued by Vestal, and taken to the battleship Nelson.

Vestal was sunk on 26 July 1945 whilst participating in Operation Livery. At around 18:25, an alarm was sounded as three unidentified planes had been spotted coming over Phuket Island, and were soon followed by several more. Vestal was hit by a kamikaze, sustaining critical damage and killing twenty men. She was the last Royal Navy ship to be sunk in the Second World War. As the ship was hit close to Thailand, which was a Japanese ally, the crew were taken off and the ship was scuttled by the destroyer HMS Racehorse.

== Wreck ==
The wreck of Vestal currently lies off Phuket at 72 metres (236 ft) below sea level.

== Publications ==
- Gardiner, Robert; Chesneau, Roger, eds. (1980). Conway's All The World's Fighting Ships 1922–1946. London: Conway Maritime Press. ISBN 0-85177-146-7.
- Colledge, J. J.; Warlow, Ben (2006) [1969]. Ships of the Royal Navy: The Complete Record of All Fighting Ships of the Royal Navy from the 15th Century to the Present (3rd Rev ed.). London: Chatham Publishing. ISBN 978-1-86176-281-8. OCLC 67375475.
- Elliott, Peter (1977). Allied Escort Ships of World War II: A complete survey. London: Macdonald and Jane's. ISBN 0-356-08401-9.
- H Lenton (1998) British & Empire Warships of the Second World War. Naval Institute Press, Annapolis, Maryland ISBN 1-55750-048-7
