= USS LST-288 =

1943 LST-1-class tank landing ship

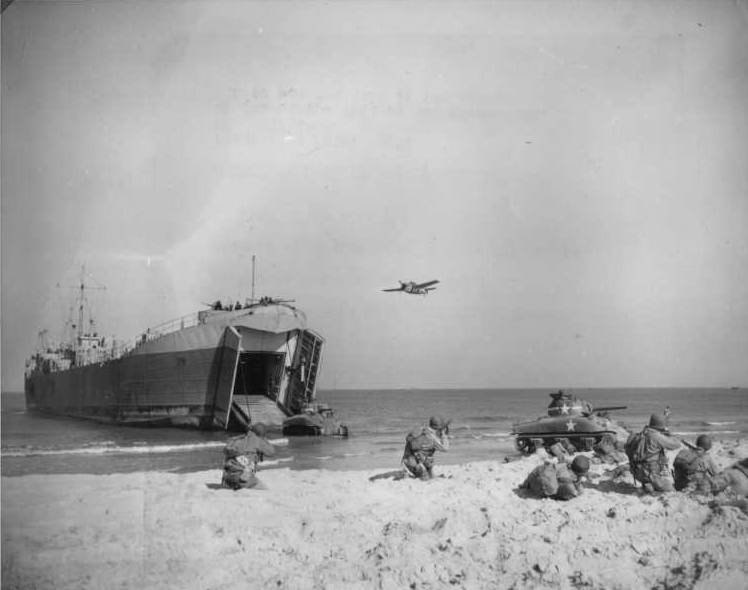
- USS LST-288 beached at Normandy while unloading M4 Sherman tanks, date unknown. Note the Grumman F4F Wildcat overhead

History

United States
- Name: LST-288
- Builder: American Bridge Co., Ambridge
- Laid down: 6 September 1943
- Launched: 7 November 1943
- Commissioned: 20 December 1943
- Decommissioned: 6 March 1946
- Honors and awards: See Awards
- Renamed: Berkshire County, 1 July 1955
- Namesake: Berkshire County, Massachusetts
- Stricken: 15 November 1974
- Fate: Transferred to South Korea, 5 March 1956

South Korea
- Name: Ke Bong (LST-810); (계봉)
- Acquired: 5 March 1956
- Reclassified: LST-675
- Fate: unknown

General characteristics
- Class & type: LST-1-class tank landing ship
- Displacement: 1,625 long tons (1,651 t) light; 4,080 long tons (4,145 t) full
- Length: 328 ft (100 m)
- Beam: 50 ft (15 m)
- Draft: Unloaded: Bow: 2 ft 4 in (0.71 m); Stern: 7 ft 6 in (2.29 m); Loaded : Bow: 8 ft 2 in (2.49 m); Stern: 14 ft 1 in (4.29 m)
- Depth: 8 ft (2.4 m) forward, 14 ft 4 in (4.37 m) aft (full load)
- Propulsion: 2 General Motors 12-567 diesel engines, two shafts, twin rudders
- Speed: 12 knots (22 km/h; 14 mph)
- Boats & landing craft carried: Two or six LCVPs
- Troops: 14-16 officers, 131-147 enlisted men
- Complement: 7-9 officers, 104-120 enlisted men
- Armament: 2 × twin 40 mm gun mounts w/Mk.51 directors; 4 × single 40 mm gun mounts; 12 × single 20 mm gun mounts

USS Berkshire County (LST-288) was an LST-1-class tank landing ship built for the United States Navy during World War II. Named for Berkshire County, Massachusetts, she was the only U.S. naval vessel to bear the name.

LST-288 was laid down on 6 September 1943 at Ambridge, Pennsylvania by the American Bridge Company; launched on 7 November 1943; sponsored by Miss Virginia M. Plofchan; placed in reduced commission on 4 December 1943; ferried down the Ohio and Mississippi Rivers to New Orleans, Louisiana; and placed in full commission at New Orleans on 20 December 1943.

== Service history ==
=== Invasion of France, 1944 ===
LST-288 commenced her shakedown training on 19 January 1944 and returned to New Orleans for her post-shakedown availability on 4 February. On 14 February, the tank landing ship set sail for New York where she loaded ammunition. A week of preparation for a transatlantic passage at Boston ensued, and then she departed for Halifax, Nova Scotia on 10 March. She joined convoy SC 155 and departed for the United Kingdom on the 14th. The convoy reached Milford Haven, Wales on the 29th and two days later, LST-288 stood out for Plymouth.

She remained at Plymouth throughout April and May readying herself for "Operation Overlord", the long-awaited, cross-channel invasion of Europe. On 31 May she loaded 425 soldiers and 116 vehicles and "sealed up" in order prevent any news of the invasion preparations from leaking. The tense week of waiting that followed seemed to be at an end when she set sail on the 4th. However, abominable weather conditions obliged the Allied command to recall the invasion flotilla and postpone the operation for at least 24 hours. Fortunately, the weather cleared in the interim, and the 4,000 ships and landing craft assembled for the assault on the beaches of Normandy departed for the real thing on the 5th. LST-288 stood out of Plymouth as a unit of Western Naval Task Force's follow-up Force "B", to which the assignment of reinforcing the beachheads established during the early hours of the attack belonged. LST-288 anchored approximately 2,000 yards off Omaha Beach at 1830 on D-Day, 12 hours after the initial assault. By 8 June, the troops and vehicles on board had left the ship, and she joined a convoy returning to England. During the four weeks following the invasion, LST-288 completed seven cross-channel trips, transporting 1,534 Allied officers and men and 627 vehicles to France while returning 601 casualties to England. On 7 July she disembarked men and material at Normandy for the final time and returned to Falmouth, England.

=== Mediterranean, 1944 ===
On 18 July she departed England as part of a Mediterranean-bound convoy, arriving on the North African coast at Bizerte 10 days later. After a three-day stopover at the Tunisian port at the end of July, she moved on to Naples where she unloaded her cargo on 2 August. Except for a brief excursion on the 6th and 7th to carry troops, vehicles, and provisions down the Italian coast to Salerno, she remained at Naples readying herself for "Operation Dragoon", the invasion of southern France. On 9 August the tank landing ship embarked elements of the Army's 45th Division and awaited the order to depart for southern France. The order came on 12 August, and she left Castellamare Bay as a unit of Task Force (TF) 85, under the command of Rear Admiral Rogers. The task force reached Bougnon Bay during the early morning hours of 15 August. By 0742, LST-288 had dispatched her LCVPs and DUKWs, which brought her infantrymen to Delta Beach at 0930. Two hours later, she began transferring vehicles to attending LCTs by marrying the landing craft to her bow. The last vehicle rolled into an LCT at 1525, prompting the landing ship to raise the ramp, close the bow doors and join a convoy bound for Ajaccio, Corsica. Before she departed the area for Bizerte on 29 October, LST-288 made nine voyages to southern France and two to Livorno, Italy. During this period, she transported over 3,100 soldiers and 600 vehicles and removed 1,000 German POWs from France.

=== Return to the US, 1944–1945 ===
On 31 October LST-288 put in at Bizerte for eight days of repairs and maintenance. In company with LST-492 and LST-494, she set out for Oran, Algeria on 8 November. After pausing at La Maddalena, Sardinia to load cargo and soldiers, she reached Oran on the 18th and commenced six days of replenishment. On the 24th, she joined a convoy of 28 LSTs, 35 LCI(L)s, eight minesweepers, and two destroyer escorts and set course for the United States, reaching Norfolk, Virginia on 11 December. Three days later, the tank landing ship shifted north to the Navy's ammunition depot at Earle, New Jersey where the ship underwent a month of yard availability while most of her crew enjoyed leave. On 18 February 1945 she loaded construction supplies at Davisville, Rhode Island, then returned to New York to take LCT-567 on board, before steaming to Norfolk on 2 March.

=== Pacific, 1945–1950 ===
On 7 March LST-288 departed for the Pacific, making a brief stop at Guantanamo Bay en route to Panama. A steering failure while transiting the canal necessitated two days of repairs before she left Panama on the 23rd. On 12 April, she entered Pearl Harbor and began 10 days of replenishment before embarking on a seven-week voyage to Okinawa that included visits to Eniwetok, Guam, and Saipan. When LST-288 anchored off Okinawa on 30 May, the Japanese defenders had just over three weeks of determined resistance left in them. The landing ship disembarked over 1000 officers and enlisted men on the 31st, but waited to unload the vehicles on board until 15 June. After that, she operated off Okinawa for two weeks and then headed for Saipan.

Arriving at Saipan on 6 July, she spent two days in drydock to repair hull damage suffered during the Okinawa beaching. In all, LST-288 stayed at Saipan nearly three weeks before setting out for the Philippines on the 24th in company with an LST convoy, The tank landing ship remained there beyond the Japanese surrender on 15 August into early September. On the 3rd, she set sail for Tokyo Bay where she disembarked elements of the 808th Engineer Aviation Battalion. She departed Tokyo on 19 September for Leyte where she took on board Japan-bound soldiers and supplies and arrived at Otaru on 19 October. After another six months of duty in the Far East, LST-288 was decommissioned at Yokohama on 6 March 1946 and transferred to the Shipping Control Administration, Japan (SCAJAP). She served with SCAJAP until the spring of 1950, at which time she sailed back to the United States to be returned to the Navy.

=== Decommissioning and transfer to South Korea, 1950– ===
Turned over to the Commandant, 13th Naval District at Bremerton, Washington on 14 June 1950 she remained under his cognizance until berthed with the Pacific Reserve Fleet's Bremerton Group on 15 November 1950. On 1 July 1955 the tank landing ship was named USS Berkshire County (LST-288), but never saw active service under the name. She was later transferred to the Republic of Korea on 5 March 1956 and commissioned as ROKS Ke Bong (LST-810). On 15 November 1974, while she was still on loan to South Korea, her name was struck from the Naval Vessel Register. Her final fate is unknown.

== Awards ==
LST-288 received three battle stars for her World War II service.
