= HMS Dragon (D46) =

Danae-class cruiser

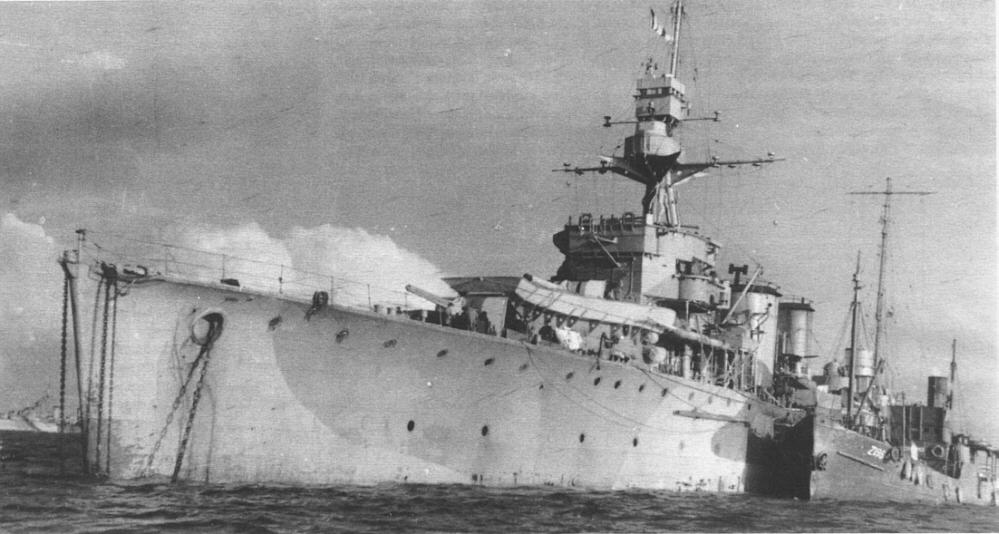
- ORP Dragon

History

United Kingdom
- Name: HMS Dragon
- Ordered: 1916
- Builder: Scotts Shipbuilding and Engineering Company, Greenock
- Laid down: 24 January 1917
- Launched: 29 December 1917
- Commissioned: 16 August 1918
- Identification: Pennant number: 19 (Sep 18); 46 (Nov 19); I.46 (1936); D.46 (1940)
- Fate: To Polish Navy, 15 January 1943

Poland
- Name: ORP Dragon
- Commissioned: 15 January 1943
- Fate: Scuttled 20 July 1944

General characteristics
- Class & type: Danae-class light cruiser
- Displacement: 4,276 long tons (4,345 t) light; 5,603 long tons (5,693 t) full; 4,850 long tons (4,928 t) after 1924
- Length: 445 ft (136 m)
- Beam: 46.5 ft (14.2 m)
- Draught: 14.5 ft (4.4 m)
- Propulsion: Six Yarrow-type water-tube boilers; Parsons geared steam turbines; Two shafts; 40,000 shp (30 MW)
- Speed: 29 knots (54 km/h; 33 mph)
- Range: 2,300 nmi (4,300 km)
- Complement: 462
- Armament: 1918: 6 × BL 6 in L/45 Mark XII guns on single mountings CP Mark XIV (152 mm); 2 × 3-inch (76 mm) Mk II AA guns; 2 × 40 mm QF 2 pdr "Pom-pom" AA guns; 12 × 21-inch (533 mm) torpedoes (4 triple launchers); 1930: 6 × 152 mm Mk XII guns; 3 × QF 4-inch (102 mm) Mk V AA guns; 2 × 40 mm 2 pdr Pom-pom AA guns; 12 × 533 mm torpedo launchers; 1942: 6 × 152 mm Mk XII guns; 3 × 102 mm Mk V AA guns; 6 × 40 mm 2 pdr Pom-pom AA; 12 × 533 mm torpedo launchers; 1943: 5 × 152 mm Mk XII guns; 2 × 102 mm Mk XVI gun; 8 × 40 mm 2 pdr Pom-pom AA guns; 3 × quadruple mounting Mark VII 2 pounder Mark VIII gun; 12 × 20 mm Oerlikon AA guns; depth charge launcher
- Armour: 3 inch side (amidships); 2, 1¾, 1½ side (bow and stern); 1 inch upper decks (amidships); 1 inch deck over rudder

HMS Dragon, also known in Polish service as ORP Dragon (Polish: dragoon), was a D- or Danae-class cruiser built for the Royal Navy. She was launched in Glasgow, in December 1917, and scuttled in July 1944 off the Normandy beaches as part of the Arromanches Breakwater.

== History ==
=== Pre World War II ===
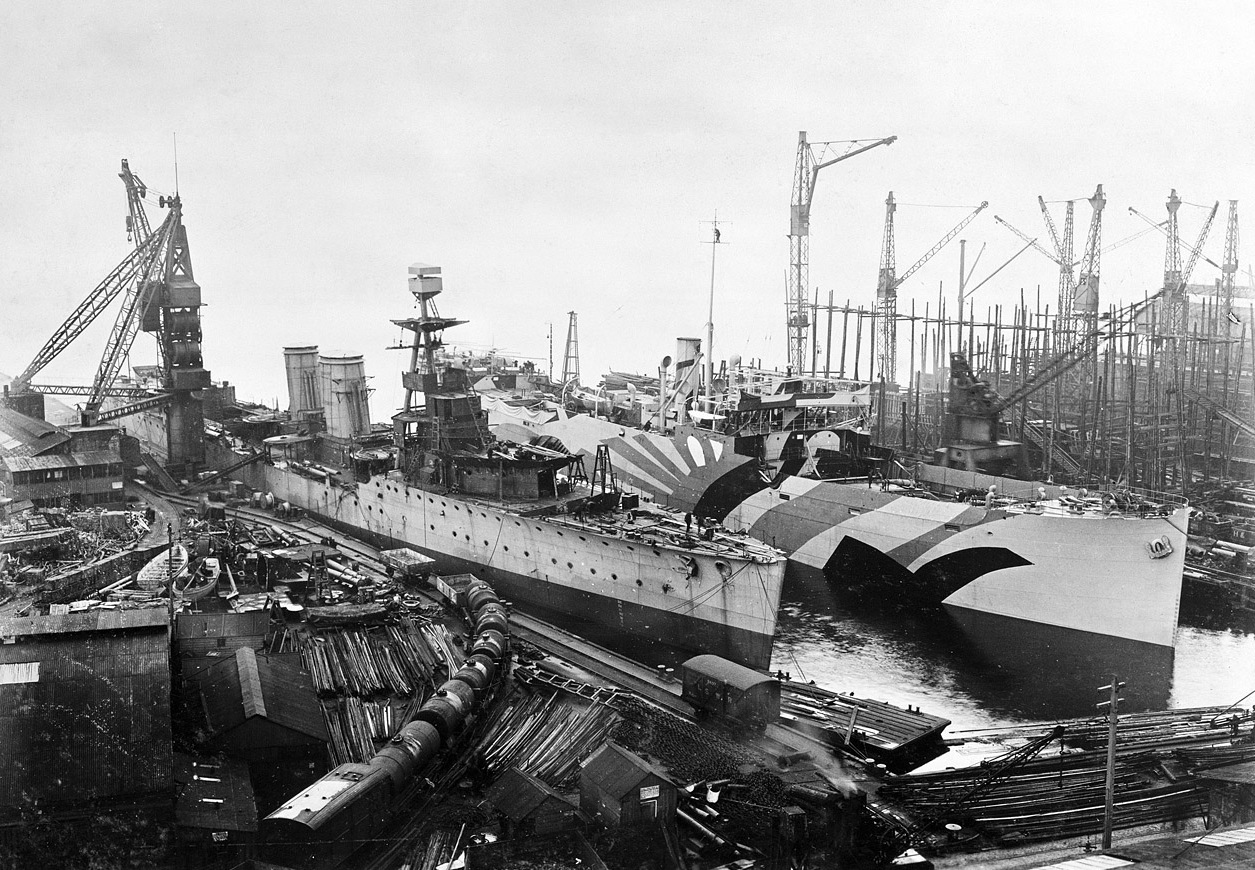
Dragon and the tanker War Angler at Scotts Shipbuilding and Engineering Company, March 1918

One of the fastest-built ships of the time, Dragon (pennant number D46) was laid down on 24 January 1917 in Glasgow. She was launched on 29 December that year. However, it was not until 10 August 1918 that she was finally commissioned at Harwich Dockyard by the Royal Navy as HMS Dragon. Armed with six 6-inch guns, the light cruiser was commissioned late during World War I and a Daily Mirror article of 1934 credits her South African crewman Maurice Green of firing the last shot of the war at sea when she engaged German seaplanes off Heligoland Bight on 9 November 1918. She carried the Prince of Wales (the future King Edward VIII) to Canada in August 1919 to begin a royal tour.

She then took part in the Russian Civil War as part of a task force aiding newly independent Latvia and Estonia against the Bolsheviks and German Freikorps forces in October and November 1919, as part of the British intervention in the Baltic. On 17 October 1919 Dragon was hit by three shells fired from a shore battery while taking part in operations against German forces attacking Riga, suffering nine killed and five wounded.

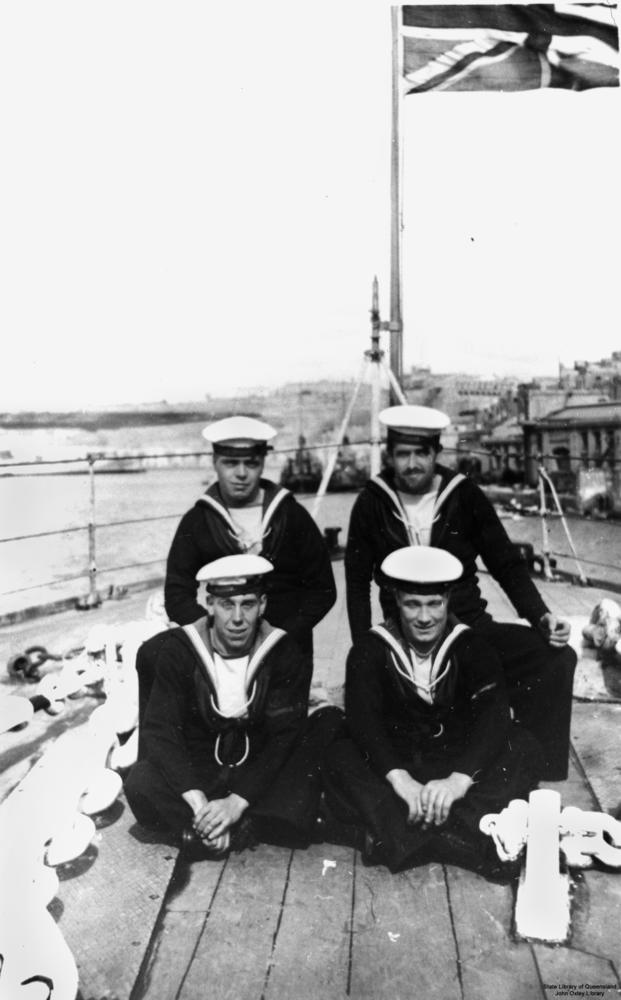
Crew members from Dragon pose for a photo at the bow of the ship during a harbour visit in the 1920s.

From 1920 she was part of the First Light Cruiser Squadron in the Atlantic Fleet, with Captain O. H. Hawke-Genn taking over command from March that year. She recommissioned 8 May 1923 and 2 February 1926 at Chatham.

In the interbellum, in 1924, she was part of the First Cruiser Squadron, Atlantic. During 1924, she was attached to the Special Service Squadron with HMS Hood, Repulse, Delhi, Danae (which would later replace Dragon in the Polish Navy) and Dauntless for a variety of tasks around the world. Dragon was stationed in Zanzibar, Ceylon, New Zealand, Fiji, Canada, and Jamaica, and took part in visits to the United States, Dutch Antilles, and Australia.

On 20 December 1928, she was withdrawn from service and underwent a major refurbishment in Great Britain. Among other changes, the hangar for her seaplane was dismantled. 15 November 1929, she was given to Commander P. W. Nelles, RCN.

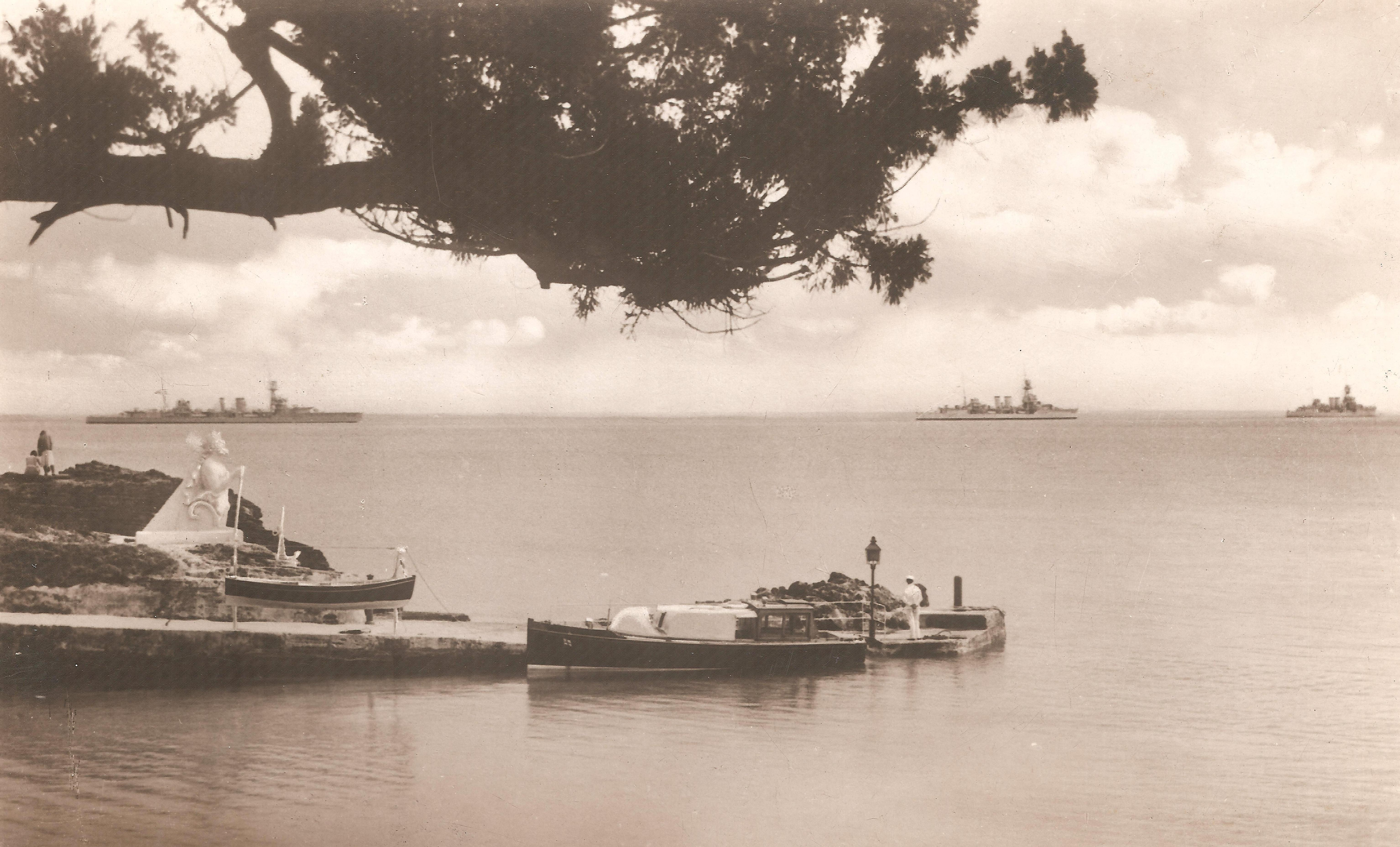
America and West Indies Station 1st Division (HMS Dragon, HMS Danae and HMS Despatch) off Admiralty House in 1931 as they depart their base at the Royal Naval Dockyard in the Imperial fortress colony of Bermuda to exercise on the open ocean

On 22 January 1930, the refit was completed and Dragon entered commission once more, and after undergoing trials at Chatham acted as tender to Pembroke. She was commissioned a number of times during the 1930s. On 30 May 1933 the well-known playwright, composer, director, actor and singer Noël Coward, who had arrived at the Imperial fortress colony of Bermuda (the base of the America and West Indies Station) on 28 May on SS Roma, found his way on board HMS Dragon. She was then commanded by Captain Philip Louis Vian, whose first words on discovering Coward aboard were "What the hell are you doing on board this ship?", though after having some gin in the Captain's cabin Coward was allowed to stay for a cruise on the ship ending on the Pacific side of the Panama canal. HMS Dragon then headed out into the Pacific for the China Station, but was re-attached to the America and West Indies Station in 1935, based at the Royal Naval Dockyard, Bermuda.

In 1934, she was involved in a collision with a ship in the harbour of Montreal, Quebec, Canada, which resulted in an Admiralty action against her captain at the time, Frederic Wake-Walker. The Canadian courts found him liable for the collision. That finding of liability was upheld on appeal by the Judicial Committee of the Privy Council, at that time the court of last resort for the British Empire and Commonwealth. In late October 1936 HMS Dragon attempted several times to tow the large Spanish cruise liner Cristobal Colon which had struck a reef north of Bermuda, these recovery attempts were not successful and the remains of Cristobal Colon still lie at the reef. She recommissioned with a reserve crew 16 July 1937, serving as a tender to HMS Cardiff, and in 1938-9 she formed part of the Reserve Fleet based at The Nore.

=== Wartime career ===
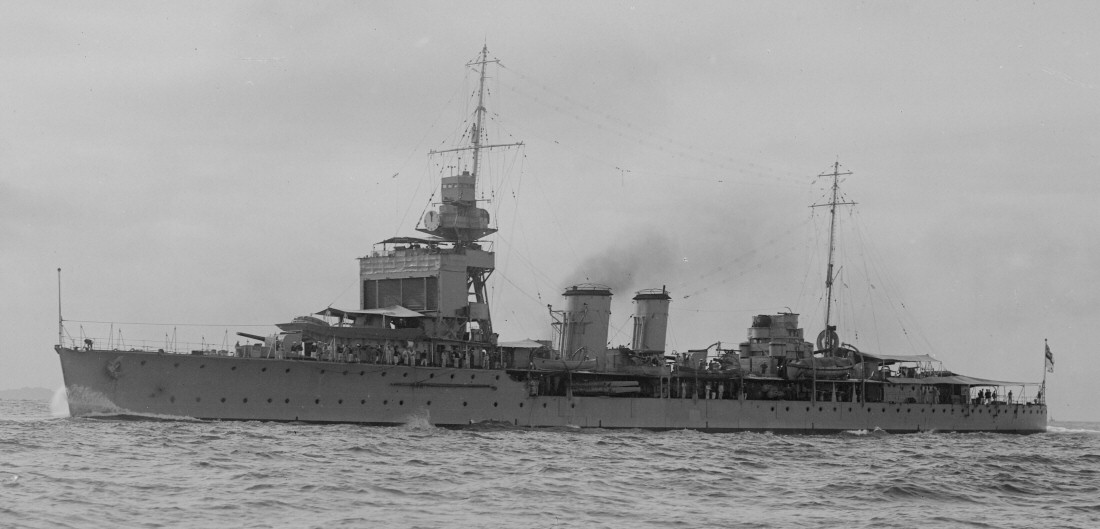
HMS Dragon in the 1920s

During World War II, the ship was initially attached to the 7th Cruiser Squadron of the Northern Patrol, operating in the Shetland area. In November 1939, she took part in pursuit of the Admiral Graf Spee. In February 1940, HMS Dragon crossed the Mediterranean and returned to the Atlantic. On 16 September 1940 she scored her first victory after capturing the French steamer Touareg. On 23 September of the same year she reached the area of the port of Dakar, where she took part in Operation Menace against the French fleet stationed there. Together with HMS Inglefield and Foresight, she sank the Vichy France submarine Persée and took part in shelling the port. HMS Dragon then moved to Freetown, from where she operated against the Admiral Scheer in December.

Until November 1941 Dragon escorted various Atlantic convoys, after which she was moved to Asia. Following commencement of hostilities with Japan in December, she served with the American-British-Dutch-Australian Command forces, escorting convoys to Singapore, with Dragon the last ship to leave that city before it surrendered. On 20 January 1942, she was attached to the Western task force operating in the Java Sea, which included HMAS Hobart, HMS Danae, HMS Tenedos and HMS Scout. After the fall of Java, she joined HMS Caledon and the Dutch cruiser HNLMS Jacob van Heemskerck, and operated from Ceylon. In May she was moved to Madagascar. The following month, most of the crew of the ship was landed and moved to other units, while Dragon started her voyage back to Britain for refurbishment. Since the rump crew could not operate the ship independently, she had to be attached to various convoys and it took almost half a year before she finally reached Liverpool via Cape Town, Chatham and Durban.

=== Transferred to the Polish Navy ===
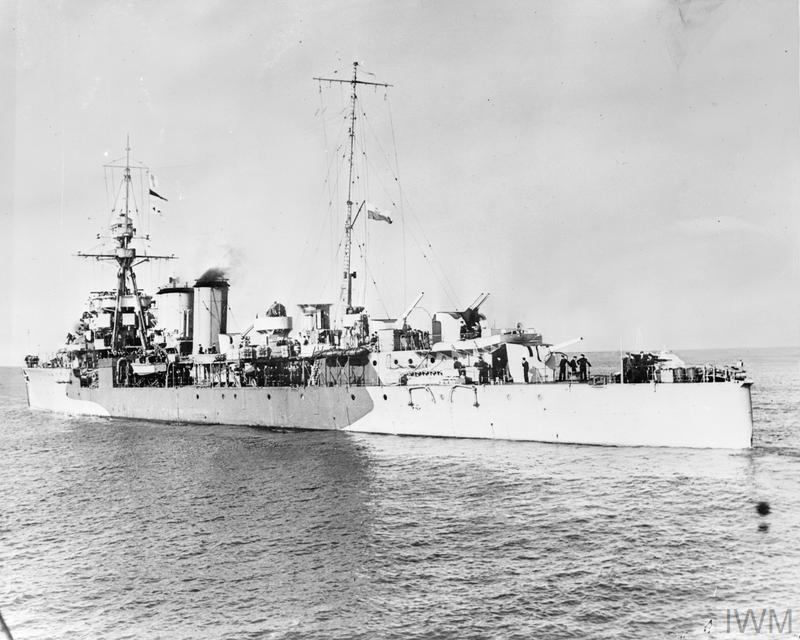
ORP Dragon off Liverpool in September 1943.

On 15 January 1943 she was handed over to the Polish Navy, renamed ORP Dragon and manned by a Polish crew. While the name of the ship remained the same it took on a new meaning. Dragon in Polish is smok, while "Dragon" in Polish means Dragoon (a mounted infantry soldier) although the latter still comes in a roundabout way from dragon. Modernized in the Cammell Laird shipyard in Birkenhead, she was refitted with new electric plant and installation, radar and armament. The refurbishment was finished on 23 August 1943 and the ship was moved to Scapa Flow. From there she operated as part of various convoy escorts. On 20 February 1944 she was joined by Berwick and Jamaica and escorted the JW 57 convoy part way to Murmansk. Upon her return she was attached to various larger ships for training of sea to land operations before the Battle of Normandy. Finally on 2 June she was attached to a flotilla composed of HMS Ramillies, Warspite, Mauritius, Frobisher, Arethusa, Danae and 24 smaller vessels and headed for Normandy.

The ship saw action at the Normandy landings as part of Operation Neptune, shelling German shore batteries at Colleville-sur-Orne and at Trouville (Sword Beach) from a distance of four kilometres. A near miss by a German 105 mm (4 in) shore battery gun wounded three sailors. She withdrew under cover of Ramillies and Roberts, whose fire destroyed the battery. In the evening of D-Day she moved to Juno Beach sector, to support the advancing Allied troops. The following day the ship shelled German positions in and around the town of Caen. However, on 8 June a communication systems failure prevented the ship from further bombardment and it was not until late at night that she again opened fire against the German 21st Panzer Division near Varaville. The following day she took part in an artillery duel with a shore battery at Houlgate, after which she returned to Portsmouth for refuelling and supplies. Between 12 June and 17 June she again shelled German positions near Caen, Gouneville, Lébisey and Varaville. During that time she also evaded a torpedo attack by an unknown submarine. On 18 June she was bound for Portsmouth escorting Nelson which had been struck by a mine.

=== Damage and scuttling ===
On 7 July 1944 Dragon returned to the area off Caen, where she was to take part in the final artillery preparations for capturing the city after a month-long siege. At 5:40 am the following day, while waiting for the order to open fire at 49°22′N 0°21′W, the Dragon was hit by a German Neger manned torpedo, originally thought to be piloted by Walther Gerhold, and 26 men were lost.

Previously thought to have been piloted by Walther Gerhold, C.D. Bekker's 1955 book "K-Men: The Story of the German Frogmen and Midget Submarines" (William Kember; London, 1955; with a preface by Hellmuth Heye, formerly Admiral of the K-Force) instead stated the Neger which attacked Dragon was piloted by Midshipman Potthast. It states that, on 13 June, a week after the Normandy landings, 40 Neger human torpedoes and their personnel, many new recruits, began a journey from Italy to Normandy. They travelled to Paris by train and then road to Normandy. Allied fighter bomber activity made it difficult to travel during daylight hours and the flotilla leader, Lieutenant Johann-Otto Krieg, was seriously wounded in one attack. Potthast, as the next most experienced pilot, took command and they finally met with Captain Friedrich Böhme, a former destroyer commander, who had been sent ahead to the Bay of the Seine to build facilities for the K-flotilla's arrival.

According to Potthast's report, 20 Negers set sail in the early hours of 7 July. (Potthast had aborted a mission two nights previously due to mechanical problems.) At 03:00 a line of small patrol vessels passed by Potthast but "I had no intention of wasting my torpedo on them." Some 45 minutes later he let merchant ships pass as "I was determined to bag a warship". Around 04:00 he sighted a Hunt-class destroyer, but she turned away when some 500 yards from him, forcing him to wait. In the moonlight he then saw several warships in quarter-line formation crossing his path and he steered to attack the rear ship, which seemed larger than the others. At a distance of 300 yards Potthast pulled the torpedo firing lever and he made a post-attack escape. The explosion, so close by, almost "hurled his neger out of the water". "A sheet of flame shot upwards from the stricken ship. Almost at once I was enveloped in thick smoke and I lost all sense of direction. When the smoke cleared I saw that the warship's stern had been blown away." Other vessels counterattacked, firing wildly as they could not see Potthast, but he managed to evade them. Later, two frigates passed close by Potthast but they did not spot him.

After more than six hours in his cramped cockpit Potthast was severely fatigued. He eventually fell asleep and in the morning light a corvette attacked with gunfire from around 100 yards off. Potthast managed to get out of the Neger as the gunfire disabled the craft. With blood pouring from an arm wound he collapsed, but the corvette crew rescued him with a boathook and rope looped under his arms. He was taken to the sick-bay and given tea and biscuits. Later flown to an English hospital, Potthast was interrogated by military intelligence and although confronted with maps and details of K-flotilla deployments he refused to confirm or deny anything. Bekker states "After six weeks they gave up, then suddenly told him that he had himself been responsible for the sinking of the 5,000-ton cruiser Dragon. ...All this cheered up the prisoner, who felt that his arduous training had not been wasted after all".

The explosion caused a fire in the 3rd magazine, which had to be filled with water, and the 3rd engine was also hit. The ship started to sink on her port side and the angle of list reached 9°, but the situation was stabilized by the captain, who ordered all the turrets to train their barrels to starboard. Although an additional 11 sailors died of wounds, the situation was stabilized and the ship was moved to shallows, where she was to await the ebb tide. After the water was pumped out of the flooded engine room, it was discovered that the hull was pierced across two sections and the hole was approximately 5 metres (16 ft) by 15 metres (49 ft). Although still afloat and repairable, it was decided that the ship be abandoned. On 10 July, USS LST-494 aided Dragon by transporting 17 of her officers and 320 of her enlisted men from Normandy to England. Until 15 July the remaining rump crew dismantled the armament. An additional two bodies were found in the ship, and the dead were buried at sea. On 16 July she was decommissioned and then towed to Mulberry "B", where on 20 July she was scuttled to form part of the artificial breakwater near Courseulles. On 4 October 1944, she was replaced in Polish service with ORP Conrad, formerly HMS Dragon' sister ship HMS Danae.

== Bibliography ==
- Campbell, N.J.M. (1980). "Great Britain". In Chesneau, Roger (ed.). Conway's All the World's Fighting Ships 1922–1946. Mayflower Books. pp. 2–85. ISBN 0-8317-0303-2.
- Colledge, J. J.; Warlow, Ben (2006) [1969]. Ships of the Royal Navy: The Complete Record of All Fighting Ships of the Royal Navy from the 15th Century to the Present (3rd Rev ed.). London: Chatham Publishing. ISBN 978-1-86176-281-8. OCLC 67375475.
- Bennett, Geoffrey & Bennett, Rodney M. (2017). Freeing the Baltic 1918–1920. Pen and Sword. ISBN 9781473893092.
- Friedman, Norman (2010). British Cruisers: Two World Wars and After. Seaforth Publishing. ISBN 978-1-59114-078-8.
- Preston, Antony (1985). "Great Britain and Empire Forces". In Gray, Randal (ed.). Conway's All the World's Fighting Ships 1906–1921. Naval Institute Press. pp. 1–104. ISBN 0-85177-245-5.
- Raven, Alan & Roberts, John (1980). British Cruisers of World War Two. Naval Institute Press. ISBN 0-87021-922-7.
- Rohwer, Jürgen; Hümmelchen, G. (2005). Chronology of the War at Sea 1939–1945: The Naval History of World War Two (3rd rev. ed.). Naval Institute Press. ISBN 1-59114-119-2.
- Whitley, M. J. (1995). Cruisers of World War Two: An International Encyclopedia. Cassell. ISBN 1-86019-874-0.
