= Hoode Beach =

Beach

Hoode Beach is located in a small fishing village near Kodi Bengere in Udupi district, Karnataka. The beach is located around 18 km away from Udupi city and is positioned right in between Kadike Beach and Delta Beach. This beach is very scenic and is a popular destination for shooting movie scenes.

== Shaka Surf Club ==
Shaka Surf Club is the first and the only surfing institute in this region that provides training for surfing. This club was established by Tushar Pathiyan and Ishita Malaviya in 2007. Ishita Malaviya, is considered as India's first professional female surfer.
