= HMS Rifleman (J299) =

Minesweeper of the Royal Navy

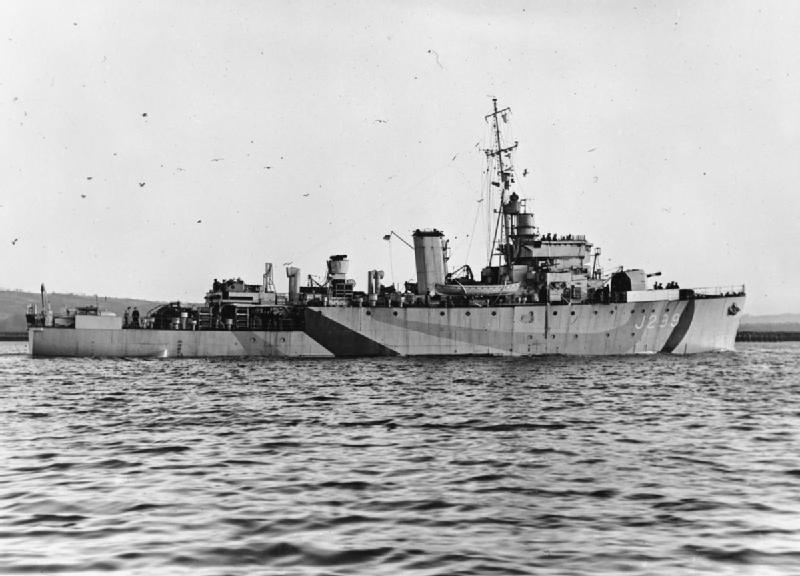
- Rifleman during World War II

History

United Kingdom
- Name: HMS Rifleman
- Builder: Harland & Wolff, Belfast
- Yard number: 1205
- Launched: 25 November 1943
- Completed: 11 February 1944
- Commissioned: 11 February 1944
- Identification: Pennant number: J299
- Honours and awards: Normandy 1944, Burma 1945
- Fate: Sold for breaking in 1972
- Badge: On a Field Green, a Maltese cross surmounted by a Roundel Gold, charged with a bugle, stringed, Black.

General characteristics
- Class & type: Algerine-class minesweeper
- Displacement: 850 tons
- Length: 225 ft (69 m)
- Beam: 35 ft 6 in (10.82 m)
- Installed power: 2,000 ihp (1,500 kW)
- Propulsion: Geared turbines; Two shafts
- Complement: 85
- Armament: One QF 4-inch (102 mm) Mk V AA gun; Four 20 mm Oerlikon cannons (4×1); (From 1958) Squid Anti-Submarine mortar

HMS Rifleman was a turbine-powered Algerine-class minesweeper of the Royal Navy. She was launched in 1943 and saw active service during World War II, both in the European and Far East theatres. After the war she served in the Mediterranean and was used as an accommodation ship in Barrow before being sold for breaking in 1972.

== Design and description ==
The turbine-powered group displaced 850 long tons (860 t) at standard load and 1,125 long tons (1,143 t) at deep load. The ships measured 225 feet (68.6 m) long overall with a beam of 35 feet 6 inches (10.8 m). They had a draught of 11 feet (3.4 m). The ships' complement consisted of 85 officers and ratings.

The ships had two Parsons geared steam turbines, each driving one shaft, using steam provided by two Admiralty three-drum boilers. The engines produced a total of 2,000 shaft horsepower (1,500 kW) and gave a maximum speed of 16.5 knots (30.6 km/h; 19.0 mph). They carried a maximum of 660 long tons (671 t) of fuel oil that gave them a range of 5,000 nautical miles (9,300 km; 5,800 mi) at 10 knots (19 km/h; 12 mph).

The Algerine class was armed with a QF 4 in (102 mm) Mk V anti-aircraft gun and four twin-gun mounts for Oerlikon 20 mm cannon. The latter guns were in short supply when the first ships were being completed and they often got a proportion of single mounts. By 1944, single-barrel Bofors 40 mm mounts began replacing the twin 20 mm mounts on a one for one basis. All of the ships were fitted for four throwers and two rails for depth charges.

== Construction ==
The ship was launched from the Harland & Wolff yard in Belfast on 25 November 1943 and commissioned on 11 February 1944.

== History ==
=== World War II ===
From June to August 1944 Rifleman was engaged in minesweeping and escort duties for Operation Neptune, the Allied invasion of Normandy. In September she was nominated for Air Sea Rescue duties during the Arnhem airborne assault, and in October she carried out mine clearance operations in the Scheldt estuary and escorted a military convoy to Antwerp.

She was transferred to the South West Approaches with the rest of her Flotilla and was employed in anti-submarine patrols out of Falmouth until December, when she was refitted for service in the Far East.

In February 1945 Rifleman rejoined her Flotilla and together they formed the escort for a convoy of Landing Ships (Tank) from Falmouth to Gibraltar. On 22 February she rescued some of the 41 survivors from the U-300 which had been attacked by sister ship Pincher. Rifleman arrived at Colombo on 14 April and on 1 May she began minesweeping the approaches to Rangoon for the assault ships. In June she was at Trincomalee to prepare for planned minesweeping off Phuket Island and during July she and her sisters came under sustained air attack, with Squirrel and Vestal being sunk. This operation was named Livery.

At the end of August Rifleman carried out minesweeping operations to clear the approaches to Penang for the entry of the battleship Nelson, and the cruisers Cleopatra and Sussex. In September, the minesweeper performed the same task in the Malacca Straits prior to the entry into Singapore.

=== Post-war ===
The minesweeper remained in the Far East with her Flotilla to remove mines for the safety of navigation, returning of the UK in July 1946. She was paid off at Sheerness in September 1946, reduced to Reserve and laid up.

Rifleman was recommissioned into the 2nd Minesweeping Flotilla of the Mediterranean Fleet after refit in 1947. In 1953 the vessel took part in the fleet review to celebrate the Coronation of Elizabeth II. At the end of 1954 she returned to the UK and was again reduced to Reserve and laid up. During 1958 and 1959 she was refitted. In 1970 the ship was sent to Barrow and used to provide accommodation, including for personnel standing by submarines under construction by Vickers-Armstrongs.

== Fate ==
She was placed on the Disposal List in 1972 and sold to BISCO for breaking by W H Arnott Young at Dalmuir.

== Publications ==
- Chesneau, Roger, ed. (1980). Conway's All the World's Fighting Ships 1922–1946. Greenwich, UK: Conway Maritime Press. ISBN 0-85177-146-7.
- Colledge, J. J.; Warlow, Ben (2006) [1969]. Ships of the Royal Navy: The Complete Record of All Fighting Ships of the Royal Navy from the 15th Century to the Present (3rd Rev ed.). London: Chatham Publishing. ISBN 978-1-86176-281-8. OCLC 67375475.
- Lenton, H. T. (1998). British & Empire Warships of the Second World War. Annapolis, Maryland: Naval Institute Press. ISBN 1-55750-048-7.
