= HMS Chameleon (J387) =

Algerine-class minesweeper

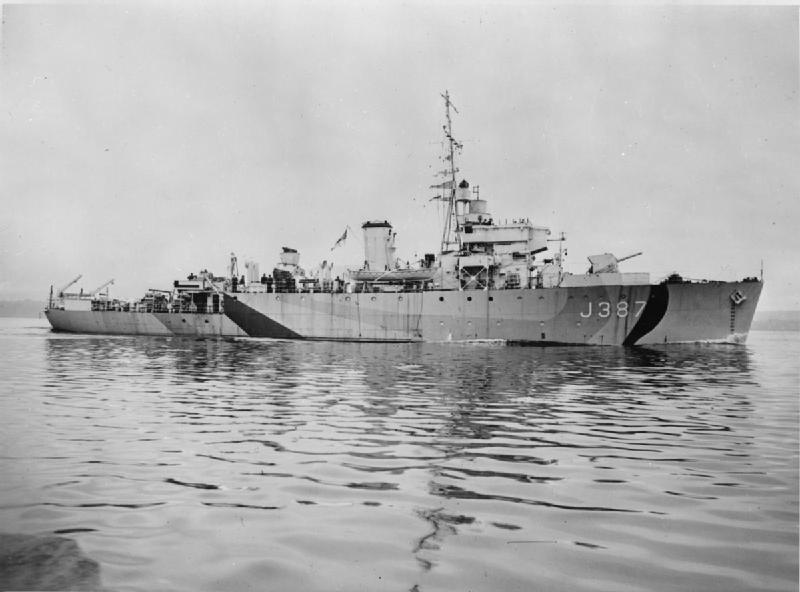
- HMS Chameleon

History

United Kingdom
- Name: Chameleon
- Namesake: Chameleon
- Ordered: 30 April 1942
- Builder: Harland & Wolff, Belfast
- Laid down: 20 August 1943
- Launched: 6 May 1944
- Commissioned: 14 September 1944
- Decommissioned: 1946
- Recommissioned: 1947
- Decommissioned: 13 December 1954
- Identification: Pennant number: J387
- Fate: Scrapped, 1966

General characteristics
- Class & type: Algerine-class minesweeper
- Displacement: 850 long tons (864 t) (standard); 1,125 long tons (1,143 t) (deep)
- Length: 225 ft (69 m) o/a
- Beam: 35 ft 6 in (10.82 m)
- Draught: 11 ft 6 in (3.51 m)
- Installed power: 2 × Admiralty 3-drum boilers; 2,000 ihp (1,500 kW)
- Propulsion: 2 shafts; 2 × Parsons geared steam turbines
- Speed: 16.5 knots (30.6 km/h; 19.0 mph)
- Range: 5,000 nmi (9,300 km; 5,800 mi) at 10 knots (19 km/h; 12 mph)
- Complement: 85
- Armament: 1 × QF 4 in (102 mm) Mk V anti-aircraft gun; 4 × twin Oerlikon 20 mm cannon

HMS Chameleon (J387) was a steam turbine-powered Algerine-class minesweeper during the Second World War.

== Design and description ==
The turbine-powered ships displaced 850 long tons (860 t) at standard load and 1,125 long tons (1,143 t) at deep load. The ships measured 225 feet (68.6 m) long overall with a beam of 35 feet 6 inches (10.8 m). The turbine group had a draught of 11 feet (3.4 m). The ships' complement consisted of 85 officers and ratings.

The ships had two Parsons geared steam turbines, each driving one shaft, using steam provided by two Admiralty three-drum boilers. The engines produced a total of 2,000 indicated horsepower (1,500 kW) and gave a maximum speed of 16.5 knots (30.6 km/h; 19.0 mph). They carried a maximum of 660 long tons (671 t) of fuel oil that gave them a range of 5,000 nautical miles (9,300 km; 5,800 mi) at 10 knots (19 km/h; 12 mph).

The Algerine class was armed with a QF 4 in (102 mm) Mk V anti-aircraft gun and four twin-gun mounts for Oerlikon 20 mm cannon. The latter guns were in short supply when the first ships were being completed and they often got a proportion of single mounts. By 1944, single-barrel Bofors 40 mm mounts began replacing the twin 20 mm mounts on a one for one basis. All of the ships were fitted for four throwers and two rails for depth charges.

== Construction and career ==
The ship was ordered on 20 August 1941 at the Harland & Wolff at Belfast, Ireland. She was laid down on 20 August 1943 and launched on 6 May 1944. The ship was commissioned on 14 September 1944.

In April 1945, the ship and the 37th Minesweeping Flotilla were deployed in support of the Operation Dracula. The ship rejoined the 7th Flotilla at Singapore and remained in the Far East until February 1946.

She returned to the UK with the six ships of the Flotilla to be decommissioned. The ship was later recommissioned in 1947 and put into the 2nd Minesweeping Flotilla, Mediterranean Fleet based in Malta.

Between 1947 and 1954, she was deployed for Palestine patrol with other Fleet units and took part in the standard Exercise and Visits Programmes each year after 1948.

In 1954, she returned to UK with HMS Plucky, Recruit and Rifleman of the 2nd Flotilla. After arrival at Portsmouth on 13 December that year, the ship was decommissioned again and put into the reserve fleet. She was placed on the disposal list in 1965. The ship was refitted during this period when a Squid anti-submarine mortar was fitted.

In 1966, she was sold to BISCO for scrap by the Ardmore Steel at Silloth, Cumberland in which she arrived on 3 April of the same year.

== Bibliography ==
- Chesneau, Roger, ed. (1980). Conway's All the World's Fighting Ships 1922–1946. Greenwich, UK: Conway Maritime Press. ISBN 0-85177-146-7.
- Colledge, J. J.; Warlow, Ben (2006) [1969]. Ships of the Royal Navy: The Complete Record of All Fighting Ships of the Royal Navy from the 15th Century to the Present (3rd Rev ed.). London: Chatham Publishing. ISBN 978-1-86176-281-8. OCLC 67375475.
- Elliott, Peter (1977). Allied Escort Ships of World War II: A complete survey. London: Macdonald and Jane's. ISBN 0-356-08401-9.
- Lenton, H. T. (1998). British & Empire Warships of the Second World War. Annapolis, Maryland: Naval Institute Press. ISBN 1-55750-048-7.
