= Operation Livery =

1945 British aerial attacks on Malaya

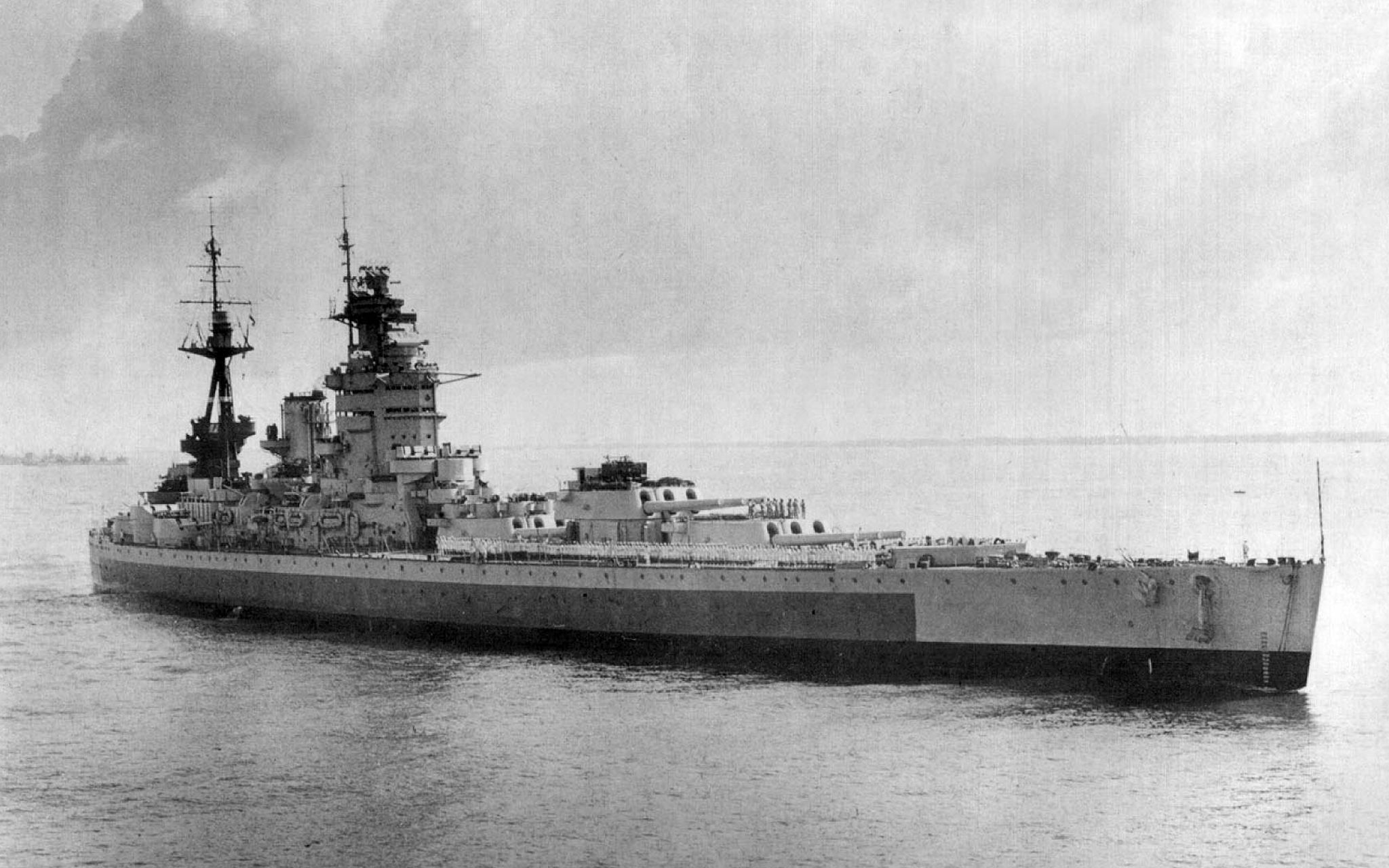
HMS Nelson

Operation Livery was a series of naval air strikes on northern Japanese occupied Malaya and air cover missions for minesweeping operations by the British in July 1945 during World War II. It was carried out by the 4th and 7th Minesweeping Flotillas, taking place off Phuket Island, Thailand. It was the last action of the Eastern Fleet during the war.

== Operation ==
The escort carrier HMS Empress sailed on 19 July to partake in Operation Livery. Aircraft from herself and Ameer were to attack Japanese targets starting 24 July in northern Malaya and southern Thailand (specifically Phuket Island) while also covering the minesweeping operations of the 4th and 7th minesweeping flotillas in the Strait of Malacca. This was also meant to give the Japanese the impression that landings were going to take place. Vice-Admiral H.T.C. Walker commanded from aboard the Nelson. During the operation, the minesweeper Squirrel struck a mine and had to be scuttled by gunfire from other ships. At one point, a mine was spotted from Empress and taken under small arms fire until other ships could destroy it. Three Japanese aircraft attacked the cruiser Sussex, which destroyed two and forced the last one to retreat. On 26 July a kamikaze Mitsubishi Ki-51 attacked the Ameer in the Bay of Bengal, but was shot down by AA fire and crashed into the sea 500 yards from the ship. Another kamikaze struck the minesweeper Vestal, forcing it to be scuttled. Between 24 and 27 July, Grumman F6F Hellcats flew over 150 sorties, destroying more than 30 grounded Japanese aircraft while damaging rail and road links.

== British order of battle ==
=== Aircraft ===
- 804 Naval Air Squadron – 24 Grumman F6F Hellcats
- 808 Naval Air Squadron – 24 Grumman F6F Hellcats
- 1700 Naval Air Squadron – 1 Supermarine Walrus

=== Ships ===
- HMS Nelson
- HMS Sussex
- HMS Empress
- HMS Ameer
- HMS Paladin
- HMS Raider
- HMS Racehorse
- HMS Rotherham
- HMS Plucky
- HMS Rifleman
- HMS Vestal - Damaged by Japanese kamikazes and scuttled
- HMS Squirrel- Damaged by a Japanese mine and scuttled
- HMS Pincher

== See also ==
- Operation Sea Horse
