= Delta Beach =

- Kodi Bengre
- Location in Karnataka, India
- Coordinates: 13.4496834°N 74.695133°E
- Country: India
- State: Karnataka
- District: Uduppi
- City: Uduppi

Languages
  - Official: Tulu, Kannada, Konkani
- Time zone: UTC+5:30 (IST)
- PIN: 576218
- Vehicle registration: KA 20
- Website: karnataka.gov.in

Delta Beach, also known as Kodi Bengre Beach, is located in a small village of Kodi Bengre in Udupi district, Karnataka. The beach is located at an estuary where the Swarna River meets the Arabian Sea.

This place has other neighbouring small islands (locally known as "Kudru"). Delta Beach, has a mini port for fisheries.

== Transport ==
Delta Beach is situated around 9 kilometers along the Kodi Bengare Hoode Road from Udupi. City buses from Udupi make frequent trips to Kodi Bengre, Kemmanu and Hoode. Delta Beach is just about 10 kilometers from Malpe Beach.

== Toddy shop ==
There are many chilled toddy shops in Bengre. It is also known for the fresh seafood available there.
