= HMS Squirrel (J301) =

Algerine-class minesweeper

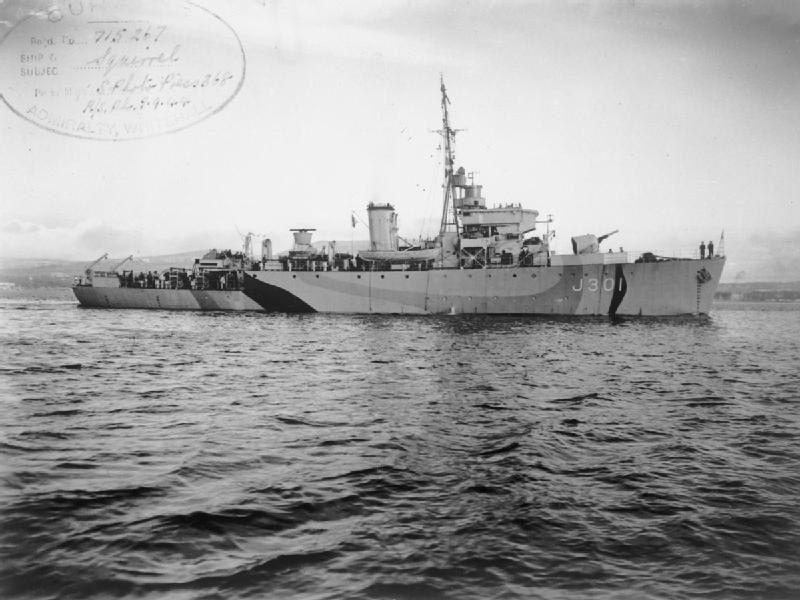
- HMS Squirrel underway in Belfast Lough on completion.

History

United Kingdom
- Name: HMS Squirrel
- Ordered: 30 April 1942
- Builder: Harland and Wolff, Belfast
- Yard number: 1206
- Laid down: 20 August 1943
- Launched: 20 April 1944
- Completed: 16 August 1944
- Commissioned: 16 August 1944
- Identification: Pennant number J301
- Fate: Hit a mine and subsequently scuttled, 24 July 1945

General characteristics
- Class & type: Algerine-class minesweeper
- Displacement: 850 long tons (864 t) (standard); 1,125 long tons (1,143 t) (deep)
- Length: 225 ft (69 m) o/a
- Beam: 35 ft 6 in (10.82 m)
- Draught: 11 ft (3.4 m)
- Installed power: 2 × Admiralty 3-drum boilers; 2,000 shp (1,500 kW) (turbine)
- Propulsion: 2 shafts; 2 steam turbines
- Speed: 16.5 knots (30.6 km/h; 19.0 mph)
- Range: 5,000 nmi (9,300 km; 5,800 mi) at 10 knots (19 km/h; 12 mph)
- Complement: 85
- Armament: 1 × QF 4 in (102 mm) Mk V anti-aircraft gun; 4 × twin Oerlikon 20 mm cannon

HMS Squirrel was a turbine-powered Algerine-class minesweeper built for the Royal Navy during the Second World War. She was scuttled after striking a mine in 1945.

== Design and description ==
The turbine-powered ships displaced 850 long tons (860 t) at standard load and 1,125 long tons (1,143 t) at deep load. The ship measured 225 feet (68.6 m) long overall with a beam of 35 feet 6 inches (10.8 m). The turbine group had a draught of 11 feet (3.4 m). The ships' complement consisted of 85 officers and ratings.

The ships had two Parsons geared steam turbines, each driving one shaft, using steam provided by two Admiralty three-drum boilers. The engines produced a total of 2,000 shaft horsepower (1,500 kW) and gave a maximum speed of 16.5 knots (30.6 km/h; 19.0 mph). The ships carried a maximum of 660 long tons (671 t) of fuel oil that gave them a range of 5,000 nautical miles (9,300 km; 5,800 mi) at 10 knots (19 km/h; 12 mph).

The Algerine class was armed with a QF 4 in (102 mm) Mk V anti-aircraft gun and four twin-gun mounts for Oerlikon 20 mm cannon. The latter guns were in short supply when the first ships were being completed and they often got a proportion of single mounts. By 1944, single-barrel Bofors 40 mm mounts began replacing the twin 20 mm mounts on a one for one basis. All of the ships were fitted for four throwers and two rails for depth charges.

== Construction and career ==
She was launched in 1944. Squirrel took part in minesweeping operations off the west coast of the Malay Peninsula on 24 July 1945. The operations were supported by the British East Indies Fleet, which defeated a Japanese kamikaze attack on HMS Ameer at the time. Squirrel hit a mine off Phuket Island during the attack, and caught fire. After a half hour the flames were beyond control and she was abandoned. Survivors were rescued by HMIS Punjab. She was scuttled by gunfire two hours later. Seven men were lost in the attack.

== Bibliography ==
- Brown, David (1995). Warship Losses of World War Two. London: Arms and Armour. ISBN 1854092782.
- Chesneau, Roger, ed. (1980). Conway's All the World's Fighting Ships 1922–1946. Greenwich, UK: Conway Maritime Press. ISBN 0-85177-146-7.
- Colledge, J. J.; Warlow, Ben (2006) [1969]. Ships of the Royal Navy: The Complete Record of All Fighting Ships of the Royal Navy from the 15th Century to the Present (3rd Rev ed.). London: Chatham Publishing. ISBN 978-1-86176-281-8. OCLC 67375475.
- Lenton, H. T. (1998). British & Empire Warships of the Second World War. Annapolis, Maryland: Naval Institute Press. ISBN 1-55750-048-7.
- McCluskie, Tom (2013). The Rise and Fall of Harland and Wolff. Stroud: The History Press. ISBN 9780752488615.
