= Kadike Beach =

Beach in Karnataka, India

Kadike Beach, is located in a small village of Badanidiyoor in Udupi district, Karnataka, India. This beach is located 3.5 km away from Malpe Beach, which is a popular tourist destination and also a major fishing harbor on the coastline of Karnataka.

== Asare Beach Park ==
The volunteers of Durgamba Yuvaka Vrinda and Mahila Vrinda, a village based social youth organization have built a unique beach park near Kadike Beach. An illegal garbage dumping zone that had developed near the beach was converted into a theme park by volunteers of the organization during the period of COVID lockdown.

Asare Beach Park was constructed at an expense of ₹18 Lakh which was crowd sourced without any government aid. The park has a 6.5 ft tall statue of Indian freedom fighter, Subhash Chandra Bose, 15 concrete benches, huts, swings and a slide in the children's play area.

== Experimental Tidal Power Plant ==
Vijay Kumar Hegde, Engineer and head of Susi Global Research Centre installed a pilot tune-up tidal power plant, 250 mts off Kadike Beach in April 2015. The setup was mounted on a seven foot high platform with a drum two feet in diameter and four feet in length attached to it. This drum floats due to the current of the waves, in turn mechanically powering the ratchet and gear mechanism attached

This experimental project had 19 CFL bulbs of 5 watts attached to it which would glow as a result of the tidal energy generated. The technology received a patent in 2006 but was rendered suitable only for area's with high tides.
