= USS LST-494 =

American former military ship

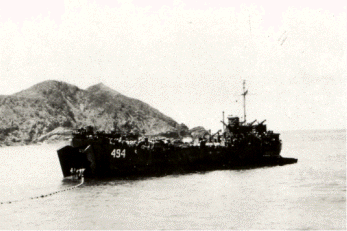
- USS LST 494-Okinawa Campaign

History

United States
- Name: USS LST 494
- Builder: Missouri Valley Bridge & Iron Co.
- Laid down: 10 August 1943
- Launched: 11 October 1943
- Commissioned: 18 December 1943
- Decommissioned: 29 June 1946
- Stricken: 28 August 1946
- Honors and awards: American Campaign Medal and Ribbon; European-African-Middle Eastern Campaign Medal and Ribbon with 2 Battle Stars for the Invasions of Normandy and Southern France; Asiatic-Pacific Campaign Medal and Ribbon with 1 Battle Star for the assault and occupation of Okinawa-Gunto; Combat Action Ribbon; World War II Victory Medal and Ribbon; Navy Occupation Medal and Ribbon with Asia Clasp; China Service Medal and Ribbon
- Fate: Sold to the Philippines 12 August 1948

General characteristics
- Displacement: 1,653 tons (4,080 tons fully loaded)
- Length: 328 ft (100 m)
- Beam: 50 ft (15 m)
- Propulsion: 2 x 900 hp (670 kW) General Motors V-12 engines (known as GM 567s)
- Speed: 11 kn (20 km/h; 13 mph)
- Boats & landing craft carried: 6 x LCVPs
- Complement: 150
- Armament: 1 x 3 in (76 mm) gun and multiple 40 mm and 20 mm anti-aircraft guns

USS LST-494 was a United States Navy amphibious tank landing ship that saw combat during World War II in both the European and Pacific Theaters of War. LST stands for Landing Ship, Tank.

== Building and Commissioning ==
USS LST 494's keel was laid down on 10 August 1943 at Evansville, Indiana, by Missouri Valley Bridge & Iron Co. She was launched on 11 October 1943 and was commissioned on 18 December 1943. Command of the 494 was turned over to Lt. Irving C. Noyes of Colebrook, New Hampshire.

LSTs were 328 feet (100 m) long, 50 feet (15 m) wide with a displacement weight of 1,653 tons (4,080 tons fully loaded). They were powered from a Main Engine Room by two 900 horsepower (670 kW) General Motors V-12 engines (known as GM 567s) which were railroad engines adapted to marine use. Their maximum speed was approximately 11 knots (20 km/h). Additional engines in the Auxiliary Engine Room provided the ships with electricity. LST 494 was armed with a 3 inch/50 cal. gun on her stern (later replaced with a twin 40 mm gun) and multiple 40 mm and 20 mm anti-aircraft guns. In the European Theater LST 494 carried 6 LCVPs (Landing Craft Vehicle, Personnel), also known as "Higgins Boats", each of which was armed with two .30-cal. machine guns. Invasion bound LSTs were manned by a crew of approximately 150.

LST 494 was first assigned to the European Theater of War. On 10 March 1944, she began her journey across the North Atlantic for England along with 71 other ships in Convoy SC 155. While crossing the Atlantic, LST 494 carried on her main deck LCT (Landing Craft Tank) 776.

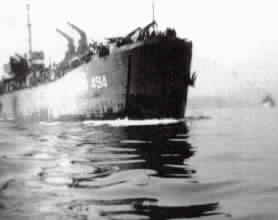
USS LST 494-North Africa 1944

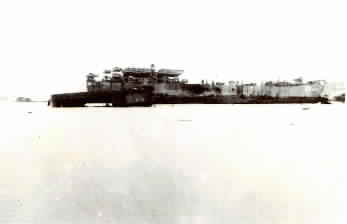
USS LST 494 on Omaha Beach, Normandy Invasion, June 1944

== Normandy Campaign ==
The 494 departed Plymouth, England, on 5 June 1944 under the command of Commander Irving "Chet" Noyes and became part of the largest amphibious force in the history of warfare. On D-Day, 6 June 1944, she made the initial assault on Omaha Beach during the invasion of Normandy. The 494 landed 378 men of the U.S. Army's 26th Infantry Regiment (known as the "Blue Spaders" from their distinctive spad-shaped regimental emblem). The 26th Regiment was part of the 1st Infantry Division. Troops aboard the ship were under the command of Major James B. Carvey. Anti-aircraft fire from the 494 helped down a German Messerschmitt over the invasion beachhead. On 6 June LST 494 aided the USS LCT 2037 that had been hit on her starboard side by enemy fire or a mine and was in danger of sinking. On 7 July, V-1 "buzz bombs" passed over LST 494 for many hours. One passed 300 feet (91 m) over LST 494. LST 494 sailors saw American fighter planes shoot down a number of these aerial bombs. On 10 July LST 494 aided 17 officers and 320 men from the Polish cruiser Dragon. The Dragon had been torpedoed off the coast of Caen, France, by a one-man German mini-submarine on 8 July and had to be scuttled. LST 494 continued to support the invasion forces through mid-July 1944, by bringing in reinforcements and by operating as a hospital ship carrying wounded servicemen back to England. During the Normandy campaign, LST 494 transported and landed a total of 1,420 American and Canadian soldiers along with 577 tanks, trucks and other vehicles.

== Southern France Campaign ==
The 494 was then ordered to travel through the Straits of Gibraltar for service in the Mediterranean and North Africa. On 12 August 1944, the 494 departed Naples, Italy and joined an allied fleet for the invasion of Southern France. The 494 landed troops from the U.S. Army's 45th Infantry Division ("Thunderbird") on French soil on 15 August 1944. Several large German shells hit close to the 494 during the invasion, but missed their mark. During the Southern France campaign, LST 494 carried a total of 3,318 soldiers along with 717 tanks, trucks and other vehicles. Allied soldiers carried were American, Free French and French Moroccan Goums "Gourmiers" and "Senegalese fighters". Lt. Commander Irving Chester Noyes was a decorated naval officer who saw combat in both the Pacific and European Theaters of War. All of his crew lived to fight another day. Under his command not a single man was lost during the Normandy and Southern France campaigns.

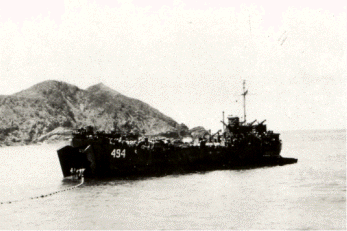
USS LST 494-Okinawa Campaign

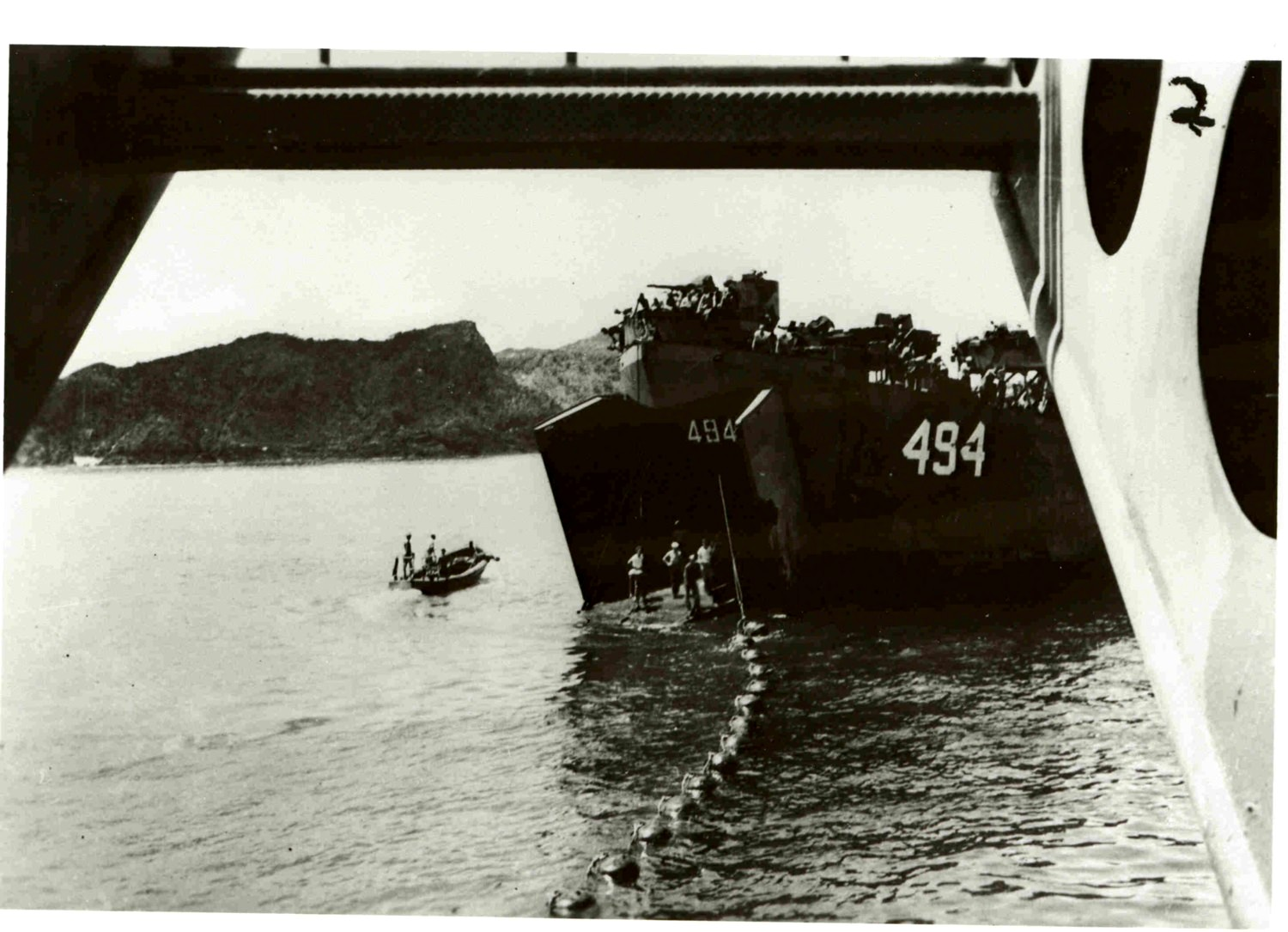
Torpedo Net Work-Okinawa Campaign

== Okinawa Campaign ==
LST 494 arrived back in the United States in December 1944. She was re-fitted in order to serve as a supply ship for small mine craft. She was then assigned to the Asiatic-Pacific Theater of War. Command of the ship was turned over to Lt. Frank Van Deren Coke. After traversing the Panama Canal, the 494 left Seattle, Washington on 15 April 1945 for Pearl Harbor, Entiwetok and Guam. The next leg of her journey was to Tinian and Saipan. In June 1945, she participated in the latter stages of the fierce, kamikaze plagued assault and occupation of Okinawa Gunto. The 494 performed occupation duty in the Far East and saw China service immediately after the war.

== Decommissioning ==
Upon her return to the United States, she was decommissioned on 29 June 1946 and struck from the Navy list on 28 August of that same year. On 12 August 1948, the 494 was sold to Bosey, Philippines and scrapped.

== Campaign Medals and Battle Ribbons ==
The LST 494 was awarded the following campaign medals and battle ribbons for her service to her country in two theaters of war: American Campaign Medal and Ribbon; European-African-Middle Eastern Campaign Medal and Ribbon with 2 Battle Stars for the Invasions of Normandy and Southern France; Asiatic-Pacific Campaign Medal and Ribbon with 1 Battle Star for the assault and occupation of Okinawa-Gunto; Combat Action Ribbon; World War II Victory Medal and Ribbon; Navy Occupation Medal and Ribbon with Asia Clasp; China Service Medal and Ribbon. In 2004, LST 494 and her crew were awarded the Normandie Medal by the French government for their valiant service during the liberation of France in 1944.
