= HMIS Punjab =

Bathurst-class corvette

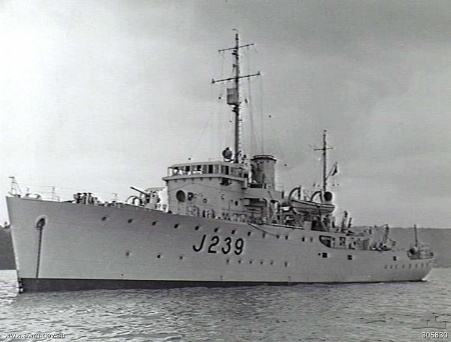
- Punjab in 1942

History

India
- Name: Punjab
- Ordered: 24 January 1941
- Builder: Mort's Dock
- Laid down: 26 May 1941
- Launched: 10 October 1941
- Commissioned: 20 March 1942
- Out of service: 1949
- Fate: Scrapped

General characteristics
- Class & type: Bathurst-class minesweeper
- Displacement: 1,025 tons (full war load)
- Length: 186 ft (57 m)
- Beam: 31 ft (9.4 m)
- Draught: 8.5 ft (2.6 m)
- Propulsion: Triple expansion, 2 shafts. 2,000 hp (1,500 kW)
- Speed: 15 knots (28 km/h; 17 mph)
- Complement: 85
- Sensors & processing systems: Type 128 asdic
- Armament: 1 × 12-pounder gun or 1 × 4 inchgun, 1 × 40 mm Bofors gun, 2-3 × 20 mm Oerlikon guns, up to 40 depth charges

HMIS Punjab (J239) was a Bathurst-class minesweeper which served in the Royal Indian Navy (RIN) during World War II.

== History ==
HMIS Punjab was ordered in 1941, and built by Mort's Dock. She was commissioned in 1942, into the Eastern Fleet. She escorted a number of convoys until the end of the war.

In July 1945, in support of the planned Allied amphibious landings in Malaya, Punjab with other RIN and Royal Navy vessels conducted minesweeping operations off Phuket.

After the independence of India and the subsequent partition, she was among the vessels transferred to Pakistan.
