= USS LST-492 =

WWII US tank landing ship

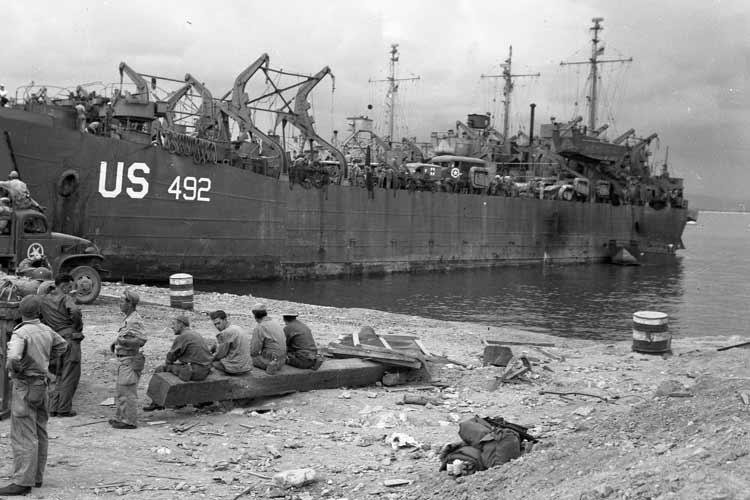
- USS LST-492 beached, probably in Italy, date unknown.

History

United States
- Name: LST-492
- Builder: Missouri Valley Bridge & Iron Company, Evansville, Indiana
- Laid down: 3 August 1943
- Launched: 30 September 1943
- Commissioned: 8 December 1943
- Decommissioned: 17 June 1946
- Stricken: 23 June 1947
- Identification: Hull symbol: LST-492; Code letters: NPBF
- Honors and awards: 3 × battle stars (WWII)
- Fate: Sold to Green's Bayou Transporters, 24 February 1948

United States
- Owner: Green's Bayou Transporters, Houston, Texas
- Acquired: 24 February 1948
- Refit: converted to non-self propelled operations
- Fate: Unknown

General characteristics
- Class & type: LST-491-class tank landing ship
- Displacement: 1,625 long tons (1,651 t) (light); 4,080 long tons (4,145 t) (full (seagoing draft with 1,675 short tons (1,520 t) load); 2,366 long tons (2,404 t) (beaching)
- Length: 328 ft (100 m) oa
- Beam: 50 ft (15 m)
- Draft: Unloaded: 2 ft 4 in (0.71 m) forward; 7 ft 6 in (2.29 m) aft; Full load: 8 ft 3 in (2.51 m) forward; 14 ft 1 in (4.29 m) aft; Landing with 500 short tons (450 t) load: 3 ft 11 in (1.19 m) forward; 9 ft 10 in (3.00 m) aft
- Installed power: 2 × 900 hp (670 kW) Electro-Motive Diesel 12-567A diesel engines; 1,700 shp (1,300 kW)
- Propulsion: 1 × Falk main reduction gears; 2 × Propellers
- Speed: 12 kn (22 km/h; 14 mph)
- Range: 24,000 nmi (44,000 km; 28,000 mi) at 9 kn (17 km/h; 10 mph) while displacing 3,960 long tons (4,024 t)
- Boats & landing craft carried: 6 x LCVPs
- Capacity: 1,600–1,900 short tons (3,200,000–3,800,000 lb; 1,500,000–1,700,000 kg) cargo depending on mission
- Troops: 16 officers, 147 enlisted men
- Complement: 13 officers, 104 enlisted men
- Armament: Varied, ultimate armament; 2 × twin 40 mm (1.57 in) Bofors guns; 4 × single 40 mm Bofors guns; 12 × 20 mm (0.79 in) Oerlikon cannons

USS LST-492 was an LST-491-class tank landing ship built for the United States Navy during World War II. Like many of her class, she was not named and is properly referred to by her hull designation.

== Construction and commissioning ==
LST-492 was laid down on 3 August 1943, at Evansville, Indiana, by the Missouri Valley Bridge & Iron Company; launched on 30 September 1943; sponsored by Mrs. John A. Spruill; and commissioned on 8 December 1943.

== Service history ==
During World War II, LST-492 was assigned to the European Theater and participated in the Invasion of Normandy in June 1944, and the invasion of southern France in August and September 1944. She was then assigned to the Asiatic-Pacific Theater and took part in the assault and occupation of Okinawa Gunto in May and June 1945.

Following the war, LST-492 performed occupation duty in the Far East until December 1945. She returned to the United States and was decommissioned on 17 June 1946, and struck from the Navy list on 23 June 1947.

On 24 February 1948, the LST-492 was sold to Green's Bayou Transporters, Houston, Texas, for non-self-propelled operation.

== Honors and awards ==
LST-492 earned three battle stars for World War II service.

== Bibliography ==
- "USS LST-492". NavSource. 22 January 2021.
- "'LST-492'". Dictionary of American Naval Fighting Ships. Navy Department, Naval History and Heritage Command. This article incorporates text from this source, which is in the public domain.

== See also ==
- List of United States Navy LSTs
