= HMS Nelson (28) =

1927 Nelson-class battleship of the Royal Navy

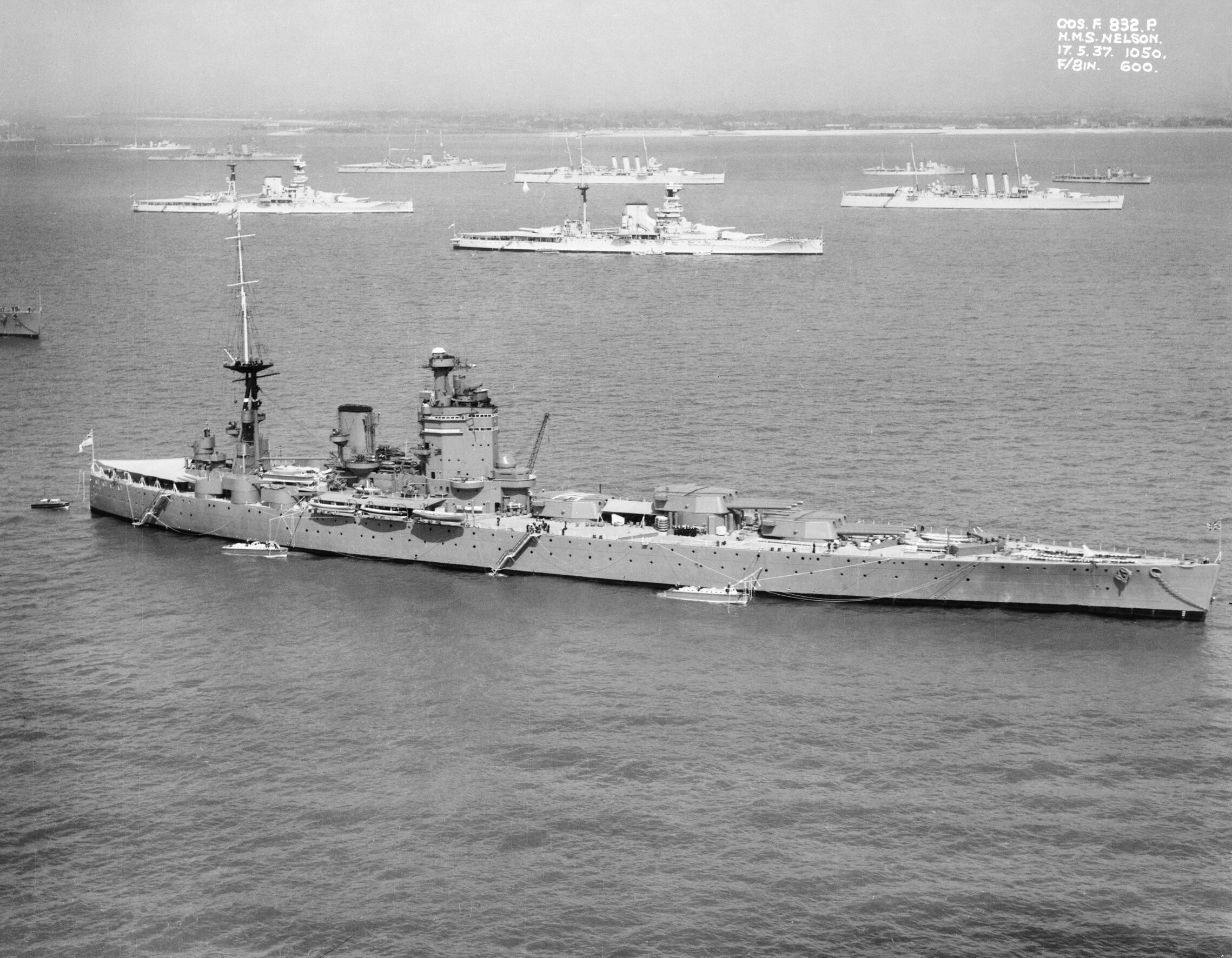
- Aerial view of Nelson, 17 May 1937

History

United Kingdom
- Name: Nelson
- Namesake: Vice-Admiral Horatio Nelson
- Ordered: 1 January 1923
- Builder: Armstrong-Whitworth, North Tyneside
- Laid down: 28 December 1922
- Launched: 3 September 1925
- Commissioned: 15 August 1927
- Decommissioned: February 1948
- In service: 27 October 1927
- Out of service: 20 October 1947
- Stricken: 19 May 1948
- Identification: Pennant number: 28
- Motto: Palmam qui meruit ferat; Latin: "Let him bear the palm who has deserved it"
- Nickname(s): Nelsol
- Honours and awards: Malta Convoys 1941−42; North Africa 1942−43; Sicily 1943; Salerno 1943; Mediterranean 1943; Normandy 1944
- Fate: Sold for scrap, 5 January 1949
- Badge: A rearing lion facing back clasping a palm frond

General characteristics (as built)
- Class & type: Nelson-class battleship
- Displacement: 33,300 long tons (33,800 t) (standard); 37,780 long tons (38,390 t) (full load)
- Length: 709 ft 10 in (216.4 m) o/a
- Beam: 106 ft (32.3 m)
- Draught: 30 ft 4 in (9.2 m) (mean standard)
- Installed power: 8 × Admiralty 3-drum boilers; 45,000 shp (34,000 kW)
- Propulsion: 2 shafts; 2 geared steam turbines
- Speed: 23 knots (43 km/h; 26 mph)
- Range: 7,000 nmi (13,000 km; 8,100 mi) at 16 knots (30 km/h; 18 mph)
- Complement: 1,314 (private ship); 1,361 (flagship)
- Armament: 3 × triple 16 in (406 mm) guns; 6 × twin 6 in (152 mm) guns; 6 × single 4.7 in (120 mm) AA guns; 8 × single 2 pdr (40 mm (1.6 in)) AA guns; 2 × 24.5 in (622 mm) torpedo tubes
- Armour: Waterline belt: 13–14 in (330–356 mm); Deck: 3.75–6.25 in (95–159 mm); Barbettes: 12–15 in (305–381 mm); Gun turrets: 9–16 in (229–406 mm); Conning tower: 12–14 in (305–356 mm); Bulkheads: 4–12 in (102–305 mm)

HMS Nelson (pennant number: 28) was the name ship of her class of two battleships built for the Royal Navy in the 1920s. They were the first battleships built to meet the limitations of the Washington Naval Treaty of 1922. Entering service in 1927, the ship spent her peacetime career with the Atlantic and Home Fleets, usually as the fleet flagship. During the early stages of World War II, she searched for German commerce raiders, missed participating in the Norwegian Campaign after she was badly damaged by a mine in late 1939, and escorted convoys in the Atlantic Ocean.

In mid-1941 Nelson escorted several convoys to Malta before being torpedoed in September. After repairs she resumed doing so before supporting the British invasion of French Algeria during Operation Torch in late 1942. The ship covered the invasions of Sicily (Operation Husky) and Italy (Operation Avalanche) in mid-1943 while bombarding coastal defences during Operation Baytown. During the Normandy landings in June 1944, Nelson provided naval gunfire support before she struck a mine and spent the rest of the year under repair. The ship was transferred to the Eastern Fleet in mid-1945 and returned home a few months after the Japanese surrender in September to serve as the flagship of the Home Fleet. She became a training ship in early 1946 and was reduced to reserve in late 1947. Nelson was scrapped two years later after being used as a target for bomb tests.

== Background and description ==
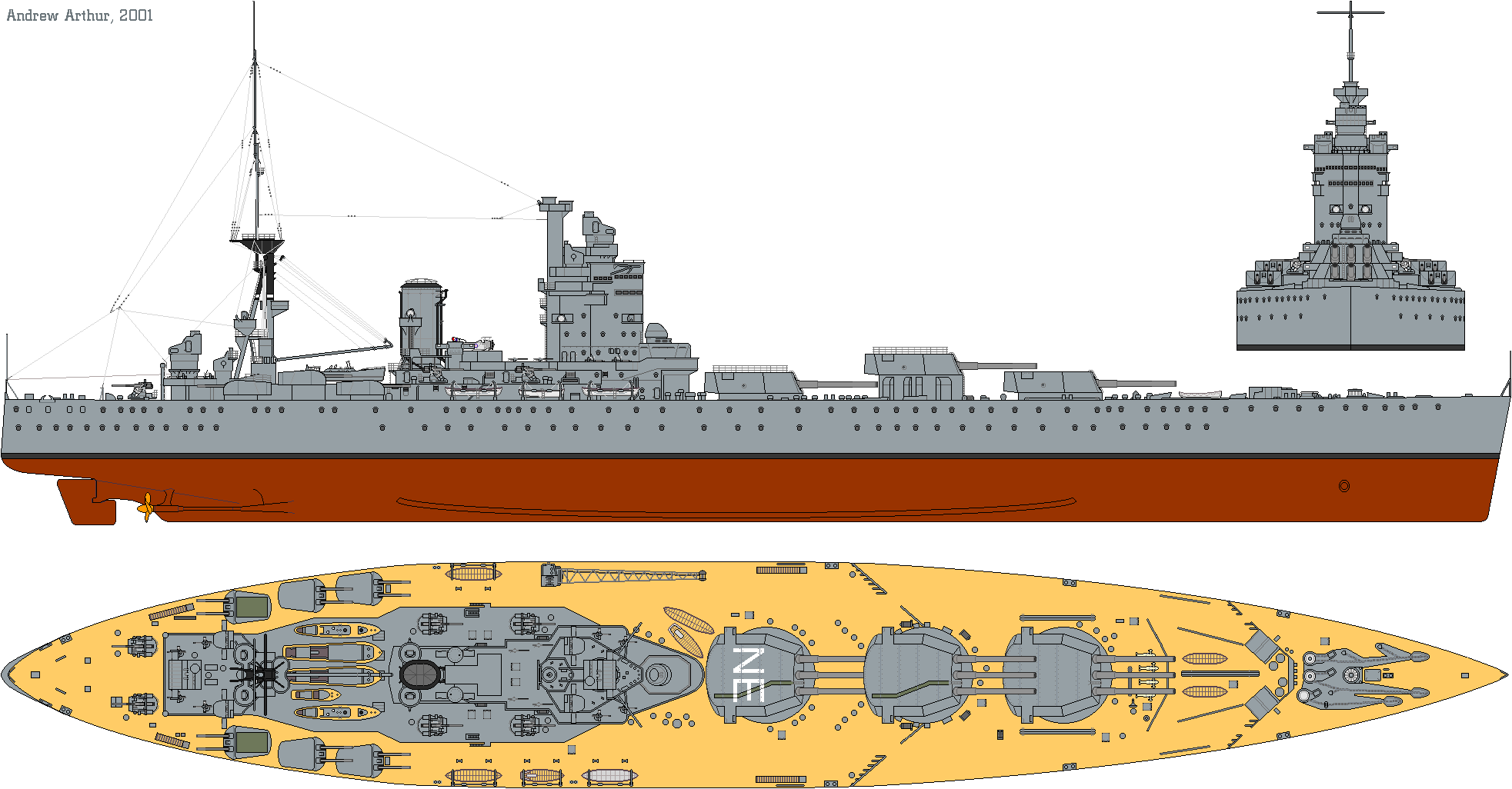
Profile drawing of Nelson as built

The Nelson-class battleship was essentially a smaller, 23-knot (43 km/h; 26 mph) battleship version of the G3 battlecruiser which had been cancelled for exceeding the constraints of the 1922 Washington Naval Treaty. The design, which had been approved six months after the treaty was signed, had a main armament of 16-inch (406 mm) guns to match the firepower of the American Colorado and Japanese Nagato classes in the battleline in a ship displacing no more than 35,000 long tons (36,000 t).

Nelson had a length between perpendiculars of 660 feet (201.2 m) and an overall length of 709 feet 10 inches (216.4 m), a beam of 106 feet (32.3 m), and a draught of 30 feet 4 inches (9.2 m) at mean standard load. She displaced 33,300 long tons (33,800 t) at standard load and 37,780 long tons (38,390 t) at deep load. Her crew numbered 1,361 officers and ratings when serving as a flagship and 1,314 as a private ship. The ship was powered by two sets of Brown-Curtis geared steam turbines, each driving one shaft, using steam from eight Admiralty 3-drum boilers. The turbines were rated at 45,000 shaft horsepower (34,000 kW) and intended to give the ship a maximum speed of 23 knots. During her sea trials on 26 May 1927, Nelson reached a top speed of 23.6 knots (43.7 km/h; 27.2 mph) from 46,031 shp (34,325 kW). The ship carried enough fuel oil to give her a range of 7,000 nautical miles (13,000 km; 8,100 mi) at a cruising speed of 16 knots (30 km/h; 18 mph).

=== Armament and fire control ===
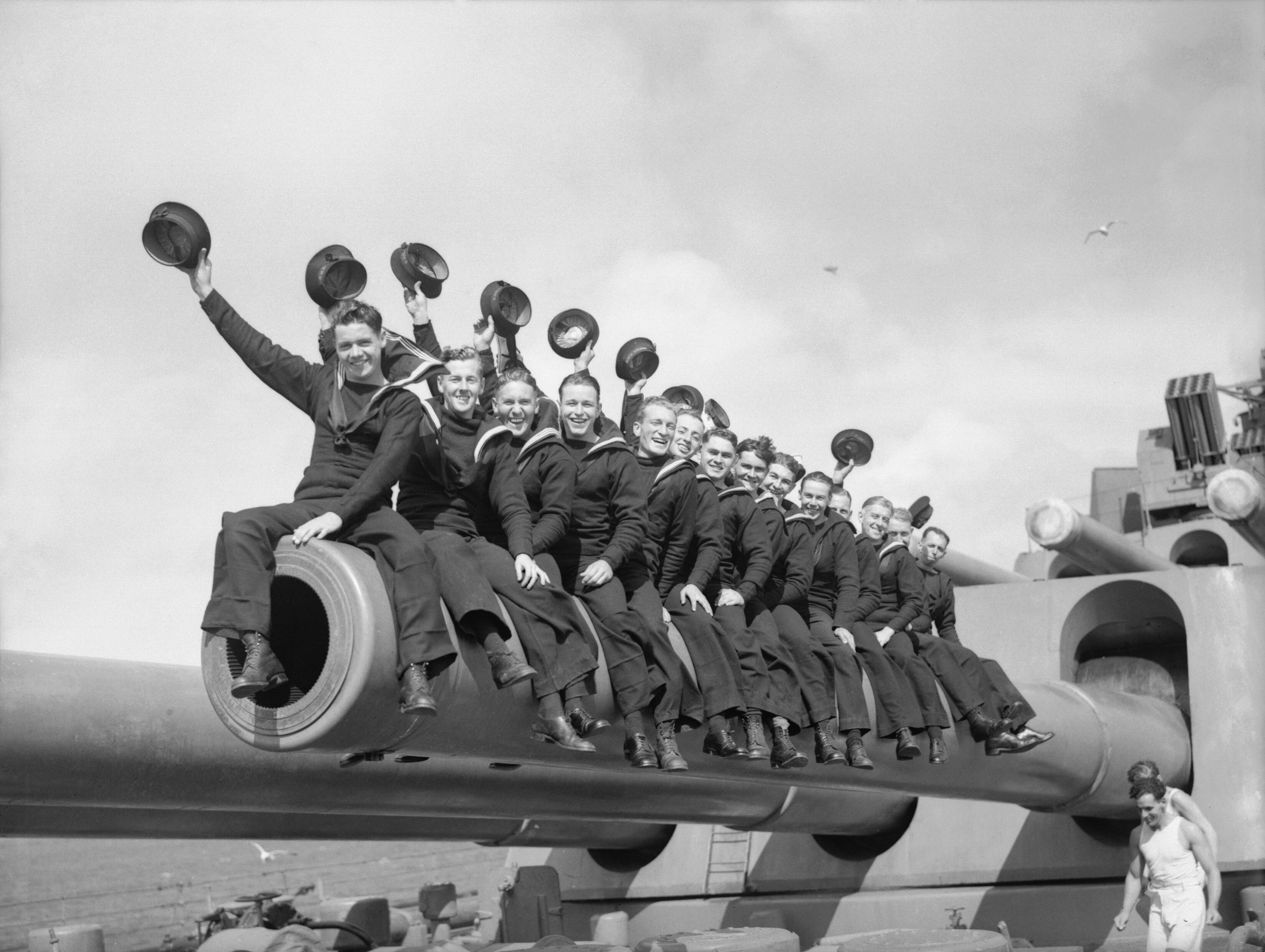
Sailors of the South African Royal Naval Volunteer Reserve sitting on one of Nelson's 16-inch gun barrels during the Second World War

The main battery of the Nelson-class ships consisted of nine breech-loading (BL) 16-inch guns in three turrets forward of the superstructure. Designated 'A', 'B' and 'C' from front to rear, 'B' turret superfired over the others. Their secondary armament consisted of a dozen BL 6-inch (152 mm) Mk XXII guns in twin-gun turrets aft of the superstructure, three turrets on each broadside. Their anti-aircraft (AA) armament consisted of six quick-firing (QF) 4.7-inch (120 mm) Mk VIII guns in unshielded single mounts and eight QF 2-pounder (40-millimetre (1.6 in)) guns in single mounts. The ships were fitted with two submerged 24.5-inch (622 mm) torpedo tubes, one on each broadside, angled 10° off the centreline.

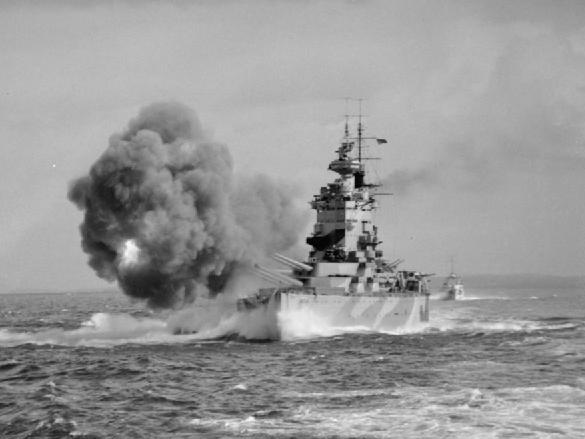
Nelson firing her 16-inch guns during a practice shoot; their muzzle blast churns up water to starboard

The Nelsons were built with two director-control towers fitted with 15-foot (4.6 m) rangefinders to control the main guns. One was mounted above the bridge and the other was at the aft end of the superstructure. Each turret was also fitted with a 41-foot (12.5 m) rangefinder. A back-up director for the main armament was positioned on the roof of the conning tower in an armoured hood. The secondary armament was controlled by four directors equipped with 12-foot (3.7 m) rangefinders. One pair were mounted on each side of the main director on the bridge roof and the others were abreast the aft main director. The anti-aircraft directors were situated on a tower abaft the main-armament director with a 12-foot high-angle rangefinder in the middle of the tower. A pair of torpedo-control directors with 15-foot rangefinders were positioned abreast the funnel.

=== Protection ===
The ships' waterline belt consisted of Krupp cemented armour (KC) that was 14 inches (356 mm) thick between the main gun barbettes and thinned to 13 inches (330 mm) over the engine and boiler rooms as well as the six-inch magazines, but did not reach either the bow or the stern. To improve its ability to deflect plunging fire, its upper edge was inclined 18° outward. The ends of the armoured citadel were closed off by transverse bulkheads of non-cemented armour 8 and 12 inches (203 and 305 mm) thick at the forward end and 4 and 10 inches (102 and 254 mm) thick at the aft end. The faces of the main-gun turrets were protected by 16-inch of KC armour while the turret sides were 9 to 11 inches (229 to 279 mm) thick and the roof armour plates measured 7.25 inches (184 mm) in thickness. The KC armour of the barbettes ranged in thickness from 12 to 15 inches (305 to 381 mm).

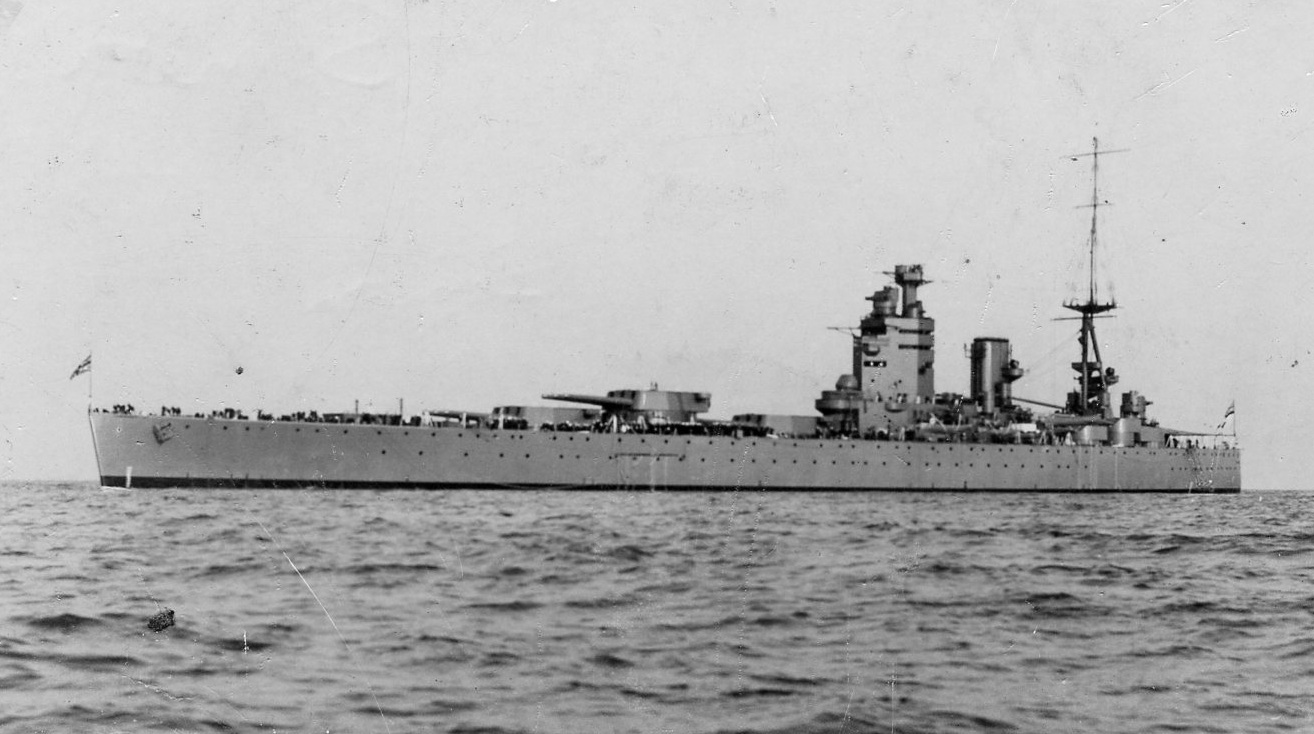
Early postcard

The top of the armoured citadel of the Nelson-class ships was protected by an armoured deck that rested on the top of the belt armour. Its non-cemented armour plates ranged in thickness from 6.25 inches (159 mm) over the main-gun magazines to 3.75 inches (95 mm) over the propulsion machinery spaces and the secondary magazines. Aft of the citadel was an armoured deck 4.25 inches (108 mm) thick at the level of the lower edge of the belt armour that extended almost to the end of the stern to cover the steering gear. The conning tower's KC armour was 12 to 14 inches (305 to 356 mm) thick with a 6.5-inch (170 mm) roof. The secondary-gun turrets were protected by 1–1.5 inches (25–38 mm) of non-cemented armour.

Underwater protection for the Nelsons was provided by a double bottom 5 feet (1.5 m) deep and a torpedo protection system. It consisted of an empty outer watertight compartment and an inner water-filled compartment. They had a total depth of 12 feet (3.7 m) and were backed by a torpedo bulkhead 1.5 inches thick.

=== Modifications ===
The high-angle directors and rangefinder and their platform were replaced by a new circular platform for the High Angle Control System (HACS) Mk I director in May–June 1930. By March 1934, the single two-pounder guns and the starboard torpedo director were removed and replaced by a single octuple two-pounder "pom-pom" mount on the starboard side of the funnel. It was provided with a Mk I director mounted on the bridge roof. In 1934–1935, Nelson was fitted with a pair of quadruple mounts for Vickers 0.5 in (12.7 mm) anti-aircraft machine guns that were positioned on the forward superstructure. The ship was also fitted with a crane to handle a Supermarine Seagull biplane amphibian aircraft carried for test purposes; the crane was retained after the end of the trials. Sometime in 1936–1937, she received her portside "pom-pom" and its director. In addition gun shields were fitted to the 4.7-inch guns although they were removed by March 1938. During her refit from June 1937 to January 1938, Nelson had her high-angle director tower reinforced and enlarged to accommodate a pair of HACS Mk III directors and new non-cemented deck armour was installed. Like the aft deck armour, it was at the level of the bottom of the armour belt, and extended forward from the front of the citadel almost to the bow; ranging in thickness from 4 inches (102 mm) close to the citadel to 2.5 inches (64 mm) near the bow.

While under repair from January–August 1940 after being mined in December 1939, Nelson had her aft 6-inch directors replaced by a pair of octuple 2-pounder "pom-pom" mounts and another was added on the quarterdeck. She was also fitted with a Type 279 early-warning radar. Gun shields were reinstalled on the 4.7-inch guns and a pair of four 20-tube 7-inch (178 mm) UP rocket launchers were mounted on the roofs of 'B' and 'C' turrets. These changes increased the size of her crew to 1,452.

During her repairs after being torpedoed in September 1941, Nelson had her torpedo tubes and UP rocket launchers removed and an octuple 2-pounder "pom-pom" mount was installed on the roof of 'B' turret. A pair of 20-millimetre (0.8 in) Oerlikon AA guns were installed on the roof of 'C' turret and eleven more were mounted in various places on the superstructure; all of which were in single mounts. The existing "pom-pom" directors were replaced by Mk III models and three additional directors were fitted. Each of these directors was equipped with a Type 282 gunnery radar. The HACS directors received Type 285 gunnery radars while the forward main-armament director was fitted with a Type 284 gunnery radar. The ship was also equipped with a Type 273 surface-search radar and four Type 283 radars for using the 16- and 6-inch guns in barrage (anti-aircraft) fire. Another Oerlikon gun was added to the roof of 'C' turret during a refit in September–October 1942. The 0.5-inch Vickers machine guns were removed and 26 single Oerlikon guns were added in May–June 1943; five of which were on the roof of 'C' turret and the other were mounted on the deck and the superstructure.

While refitting in the United States in late 1944 to prepare her for operations in the Pacific Ocean, her anti-aircraft armament was augmented with 21 more Oerlikon guns for a total of 61 weapons. The back-up director and its armoured hood were replaced by a new platform for a pair of quadruple mounts for 40 mm Bofors AA guns; another pair of quadruple mounts were added abaft the funnel. Most of the "pom-pom" directors were replaced by four Mk 51 directors for the Bofors guns. These additions increased the ship's deep displacement to 44,054 long tons (44,761 t) and her crew to 1,631–1,650 men.

== Construction and career ==
Nelson, named after Vice-Admiral Horatio Nelson, was the third ship of her name to serve in the Royal Navy. She was laid down on 28 December 1922 as part of the 1922 Naval Programme at Armstrong Whitworth's Low Walker shipyard in North Tyneside, Newcastle upon Tyne and was launched on 3 September 1925. After completing her preliminary sea trials, she was commissioned on 15 August 1927 at a cost of £7,504,055. The Nelson-class ships received several nicknames: Nelsol and Rodnol after the Royal Fleet Auxiliary oil tankers with a prominent amidships superstructure and names ending in "ol", The Queen's Mansions after a resemblance between her superstructure and the Queen Anne's Mansions block of flats, the pair of boots, the ugly sisters and the Cherry Tree class as they were cut down by the Washington Naval Treaty. Nelson's trials resumed after she was formally commissioned and continued in October; the ship entered service on 21 October as the flagship of the Atlantic Fleet (renamed as Home Fleet in March 1932) and remained so, aside from refits or repairs, until 1 April 1941. Prince George, the fourth son of King George V and Queen Mary, served aboard her as a lieutenant on the Admiral's staff until his transfer to the light cruiser HMS Durban in 1928. In April 1928, the ship hosted King Amanullah of Afghanistan during exercises off Portland.

On 29 March 1931, she collided with the steamship SS West Wales, of Cardiff, Wales, in foggy conditions off Cape Gilano, Spain, although neither vessel was badly damaged. Nelson's damage was repaired in July. In mid-September, the crew of Nelson took part in the Invergordon Mutiny when they refused orders to go to sea for an exercise, although they relented after several days when the Admiralty reduced the severity of the pay cuts that prompted the mutiny. On 12 January 1934, she ran aground on Hamilton's Shoal, just off Southsea, as she was about to depart with the Home Fleet for the spring cruise in the West Indies. After removing some supplies and equipment, the ship floated off during the next high tide, undamaged. The subsequent investigation did not find any of the ship's officers at fault, attributing the incident to her poor handling at low speed. Nelson participated in King George V's Silver Jubilee Fleet Review in Spithead on 16 July 1935 and then King George VI's Coronation Fleet Review on 20 May 1937. After a lengthy refit later that year, the ship visited Lisbon, Portugal, together with her sister Rodney in February 1938.

=== Second World War ===
When Great Britain declared war on Germany, on 3 September 1939, Nelson and the bulk of the Home Fleet were unsuccessfully patrolling the waters between Iceland, Norway and Scotland for German blockade runners and then did much the same off the Norwegian coast from 6–10 September. On 25–26 September, she helped to cover the salvage and rescue operations of the damaged submarine HMS Spearfish. A month later, the ship covered an iron ore convoy from Narvik, Norway. On 30 October, Nelson was unsuccessfully attacked by the German submarine U-56 near the Orkney Islands and was hit by two of the three torpedoes fired at a range of 870 yards (800 m), none of which exploded. After the sinking of the armed merchant cruiser Rawalpindi off the coast of Iceland on 23 November by the German battleships Scharnhorst and Gneisenau, Nelson and her sister participated in the futile pursuit of them. On 4 December 1939, she detonated a magnetic mine (laid by U-31) at the entrance to Loch Ewe on the Scottish coast and was under repair in HM Dockyard, Portsmouth, until August 1940. The mine blew a 10-by-6-foot (3.0 by 1.8 m) hole in the hull forward of 'A' turret which flooded the torpedo compartment and some adjacent compartments. The flooding caused a small list and caused the ship to trim down by the bow. No one was killed, but 74 sailors were wounded.

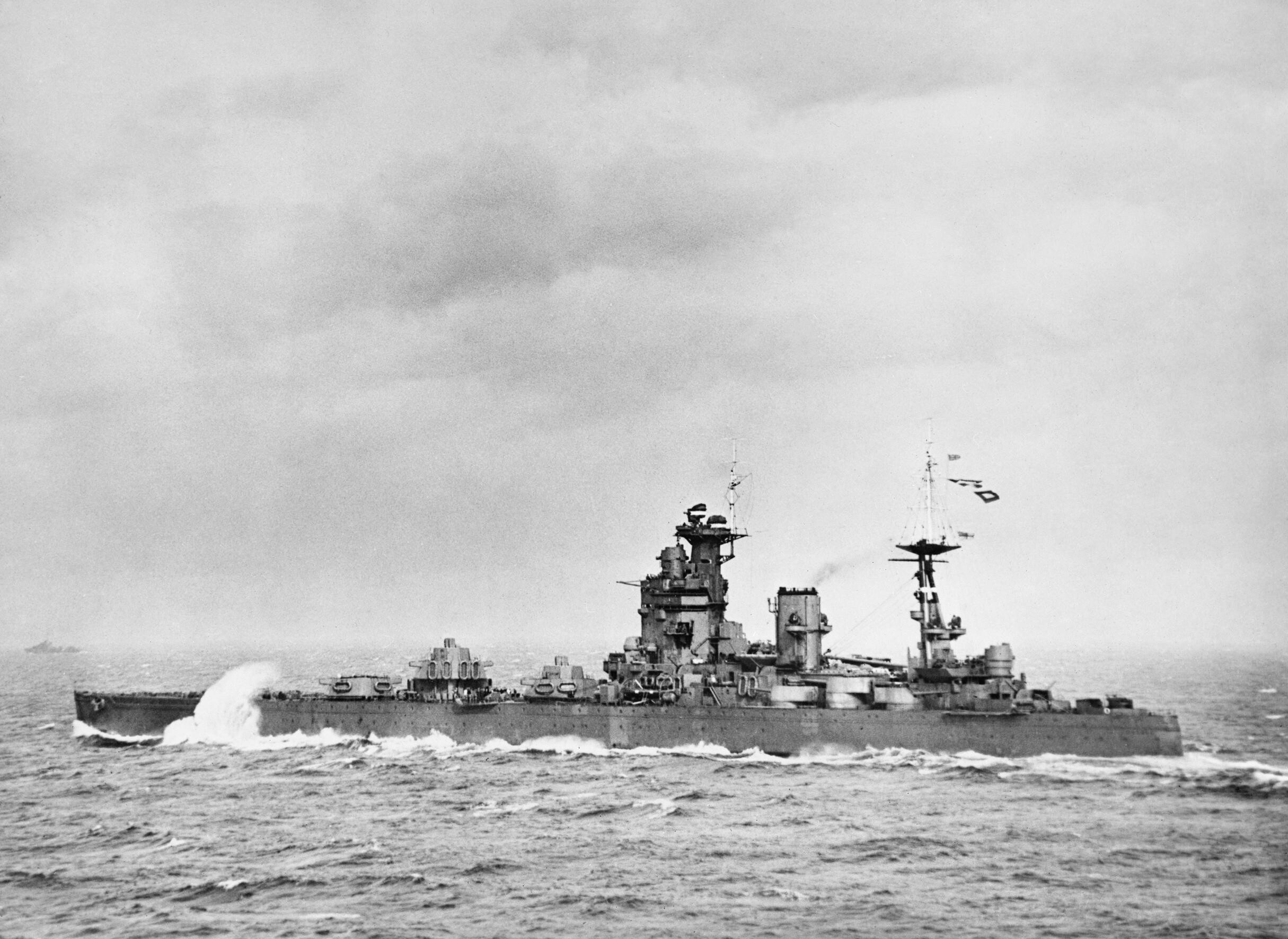
Nelson in the Firth of Forth, September 1940; the Unrotated Projectile mounts are visible on the roofs of two of her main-gun turrets

After returning to service in August, Nelson, Rodney and the battlecruiser Hood were transferred from Scapa Flow to Rosyth, Scotland, in case of invasion. When the signal from the armed merchant cruiser Jervis Bay that she was being attacked by the German heavy cruiser Admiral Scheer on 5 November was received by the Admiralty, Nelson and Rodney were deployed to block the gap between Iceland and the Faroe Islands, although Admiral Scheer headed for the South Atlantic afterwards. When the Admiralty learned that Gneisenau and Scharnhorst were attempting to break out into the North Atlantic to resume commerce raiding operations, Nelson, Rodney and the battlecruiser Renown were ordered on 25 January 1941 to assume a position south of Iceland where they could intercept them. After spotting a pair of British cruisers on 28 January, the German ships turned away and were not pursued.

Nelson became a private ship on 1 April and she was detached to escort Convoy WS.7 from the UK to South Africa, visiting Freetown, Sierra Leone, on the 4th. On the return voyage, she and the aircraft carrier Eagle passed the German auxiliary cruiser Atlantis at a range of 7,700 yards (7,000 m) during the night of 18 May in the South Atlantic without spotting the German ship. After the Battle of the Denmark Strait on 24 May, the German battleship Bismarck was spotted two days later heading for France and Nelson and Eagle were ordered to join the pursuit from their position north of Freetown. Bismarck was sunk the following day well before Nelson and her consort could reach her. On 1 June, the battleship was assigned to escort Convoy SL.75 to the UK. After the German supply ship Gonzenheim was able to evade the armed merchant cruiser Esperance Bay on 4 June, Nelson was detached to intercept the German ship, which was scuttled by her crew when they spotted Nelson approaching later that day. After arriving in the UK, the ship rejoined the Home Fleet.

==== Mediterranean service ====
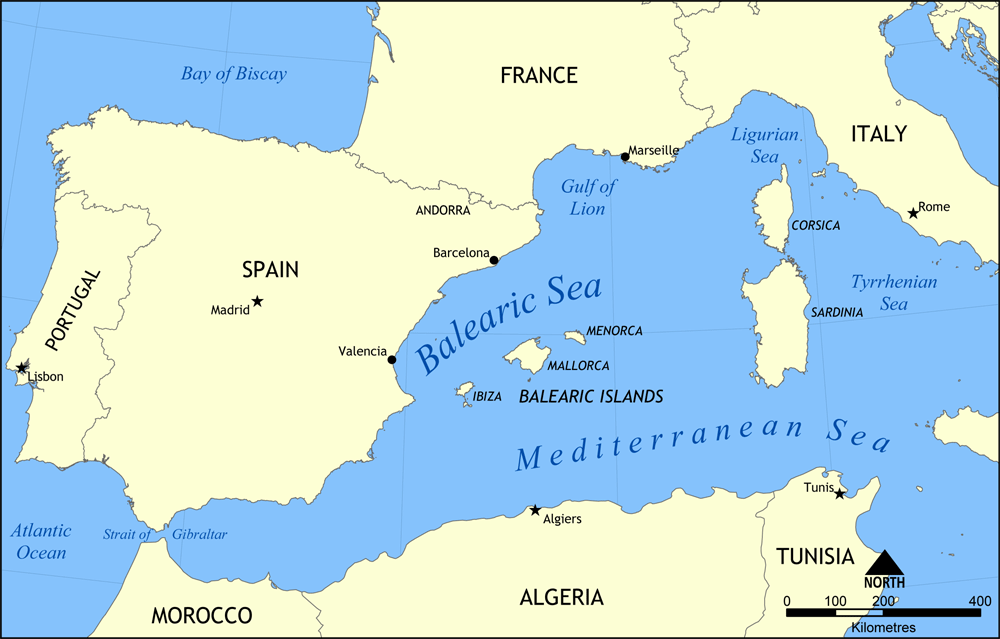
Map of the western Mediterranean, where Nelson spent much of her wartime career

On 11 July, the ship was assigned to escort Convoy WS.9C that consisted of merchantmen that were to pass into the Mediterranean to deliver troops and supplies to Malta. Once they passed Gibraltar, the escorts were designated as Force X and they were to be reinforced by Force H while in the Western Mediterranean. The ships entered the Mediterranean on the night of 20/21 July and they were attacked by Italian aircraft beginning on the morning of the 23rd. Nelson was not engaged and joined Force H later that day as the merchantmen and their escort continued onwards to Malta. The cruisers from Force X rejoined them two days later and the combined force arrived back in Gibraltar on 27 July. On 31 July–4 August, Force H provided distant cover to another convoy to Malta (Operation Style). Vice-Admiral James Somerville, commander of Force H, transferred his flag to Nelson on 8 August. Several weeks later, the ship participated in Operation Mincemeat, during which Force H escorted a minelayer to Livorno to lay its mines while Ark Royal's aircraft attacked Northern Sardinia as a diversion. On 13 September, Force H escorted Ark Royal and the aircraft carrier Furious into the Western Mediterranean as they flew off 45 Hawker Hurricane fighters to Malta.

As part of a deception operation when Operation Halberd, another mission to convey troops and supplies to Malta, began on 24 September, Somerville's flag was transferred to Rodney while Nelson and some escorting destroyers departed Gibraltar heading westwards as if the former ship had relieved the latter. Rodney and the rest of Force H headed eastwards with Nelson and her escorts joining the main body during the night. The British were spotted the following morning and attacked by Regia Aeronautica (Royal Italian Air Force) aircraft the next day. A Savoia-Marchetti SM.84 torpedo bomber penetrated the screen and dropped a torpedo at a range of 450 yards (410 m). It blew a 30-by-15-foot (9.1 by 4.6 m) hole in the bow, wrecked the torpedo compartment and caused extensive flooding; there were no casualties amongst the crew. Although she was down at the bow by eight feet (2.4 m) and ultimately limited to a speed of 12 knots (22 km/h; 14 mph) to reduce the pressure on her bulkheads, Nelson remained with the fleet to so that the Italians would not know that she had been damaged. After emergency repairs were made in Gibraltar, the ship proceeded to Rosyth where she was under repair until May 1942.

Nelson was assigned to the Eastern Fleet after she finished working up and departed 31 May, escorting Convoy WS.19P from the Clyde to Freetown and its continuation WS.19PF to Durban, South Africa, en route. She was recalled on 26 June to participate in Operation Pedestal, a major effort to resupply Malta. Reaching Scapa Flow exactly a month later, she became the flagship of Vice-Admiral Edward Syfret, commander of the operation, the following day. The convoy departed the Clyde on 3 August and conducted training before passing through the Strait of Gibraltar on the night of 9/10 August. The convoy was spotted later that morning and the Axis attacks began the following day with the sinking of Eagle by a German submarine. Despite repeated attacks by Axis aircraft and submarines, Nelson was not damaged and made no claims to have shot down any aircraft before the convoy's capital ships turned back before reaching the Skerki Banks between Sicily and Tunisia late in the day on the 12th. The ship returned to Scapa Flow afterwards.

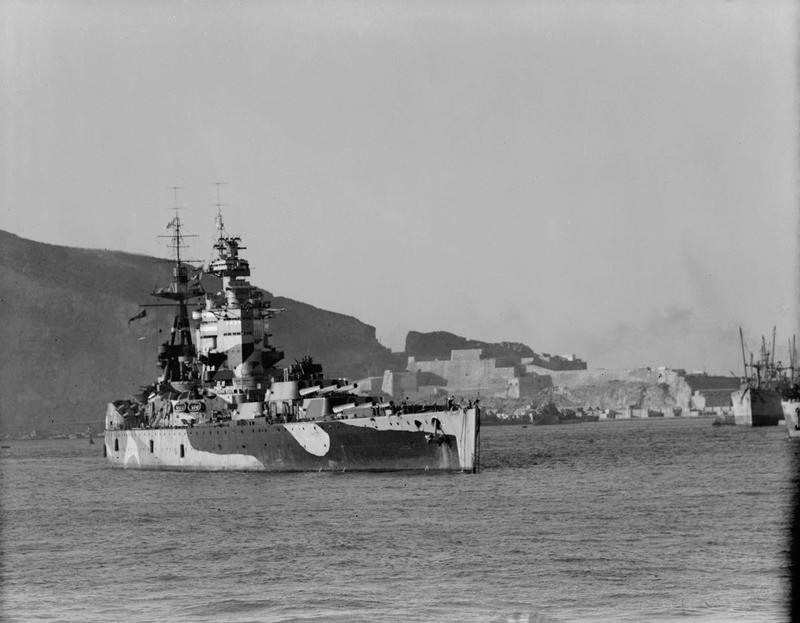
Nelson in Mers-el-Kebir, French Algeria, 20 November 1942

She was transferred to Force H in October to support Operation Torch, departing on the 30th and she arrived in Gibraltar on 6 November. Two days later, Force H provided cover against any interference by the Regia Marina for the invading forces in the Mediterranean as they began their landings. Syfret, now commander of Force H, hoisted his flag aboard Nelson on 15 November. Force H covered a troop convoy from Gibraltar to Algiers, French Algeria, in January 1943. Syfret temporarily transferred his flag to the battleship King George V in May as Nelson returned to Scapa Flow to train for Operation Husky, the invasion of Sicily. The ship departed Scapa on 17 June and arrived at Gibraltar on the 23rd.

==== 1943–1949 ====
On 9 July, Force H, with Nelson, Rodney and the carrier Indomitable, rendezvoused in the Gulf of Sirte with the battleships Warspite, Valiant and the carrier Formidable coming from Alexandria, Egypt to form the covering force for the invasion. The following day, they began patrolling in the Ionian Sea to deter any attempt by the Regia Marina to interfere with the landings in Sicily. On 31 August, Nelson and Rodney bombarded coastal artillery positions between Reggio Calabria and Pessaro in preparation for Operation Baytown, the amphibious invasion of Calabria, Italy. The sisters covered the amphibious landings at Salerno (Operation Avalanche) on 9 September with Nelson using her main guns in "barrage" mode to deter attacking German torpedo bombers. The Italian surrender was signed between General Dwight Eisenhower and Marshal Pietro Badoglio aboard the ship on 29 September.

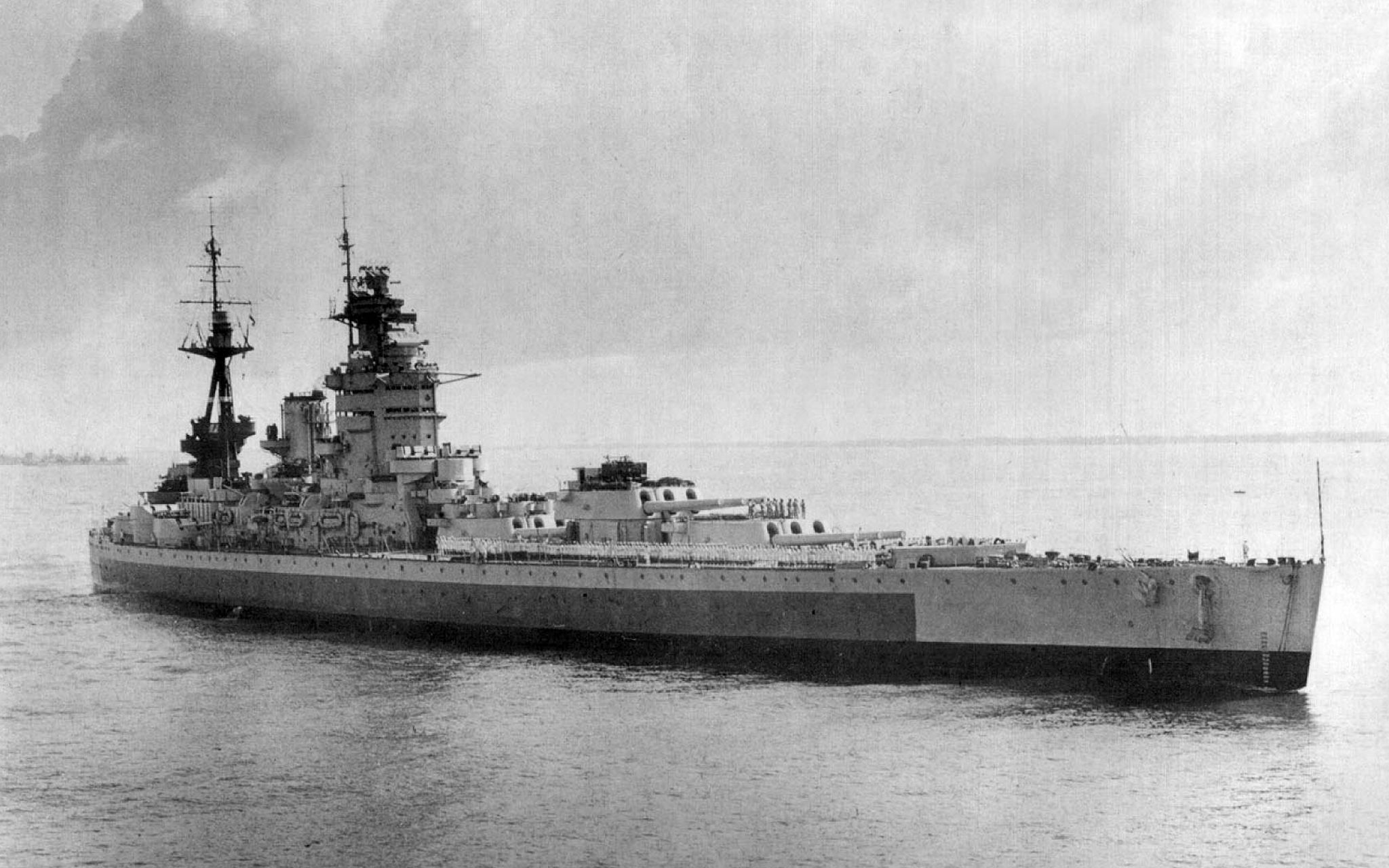
Nelson, 1945

Nelson departed Gibraltar on 31 October for England to rejoin the Home Fleet. She provided naval gunfire support during the Normandy landings in June 1944, but was badly damaged after hitting two mines on the 18th. Temporarily repaired in Portsmouth, the ship was sent to the Philadelphia Naval Shipyard in the United States on 22 June for repairs. She returned to Britain in January 1945 and was then assigned to the Eastern Fleet, arriving in Colombo, Ceylon, on 9 July. The ship became the fleet flagship three days later. Nelson was used on the western coast of the Malayan Peninsula for three months, taking part in Operation Livery. The Japanese forces there formally surrendered aboard her at George Town, Penang, on 2 September 1945. Ten days later, the ship was present when the Japanese forces in all of South-east Asia surrendered in Singapore.

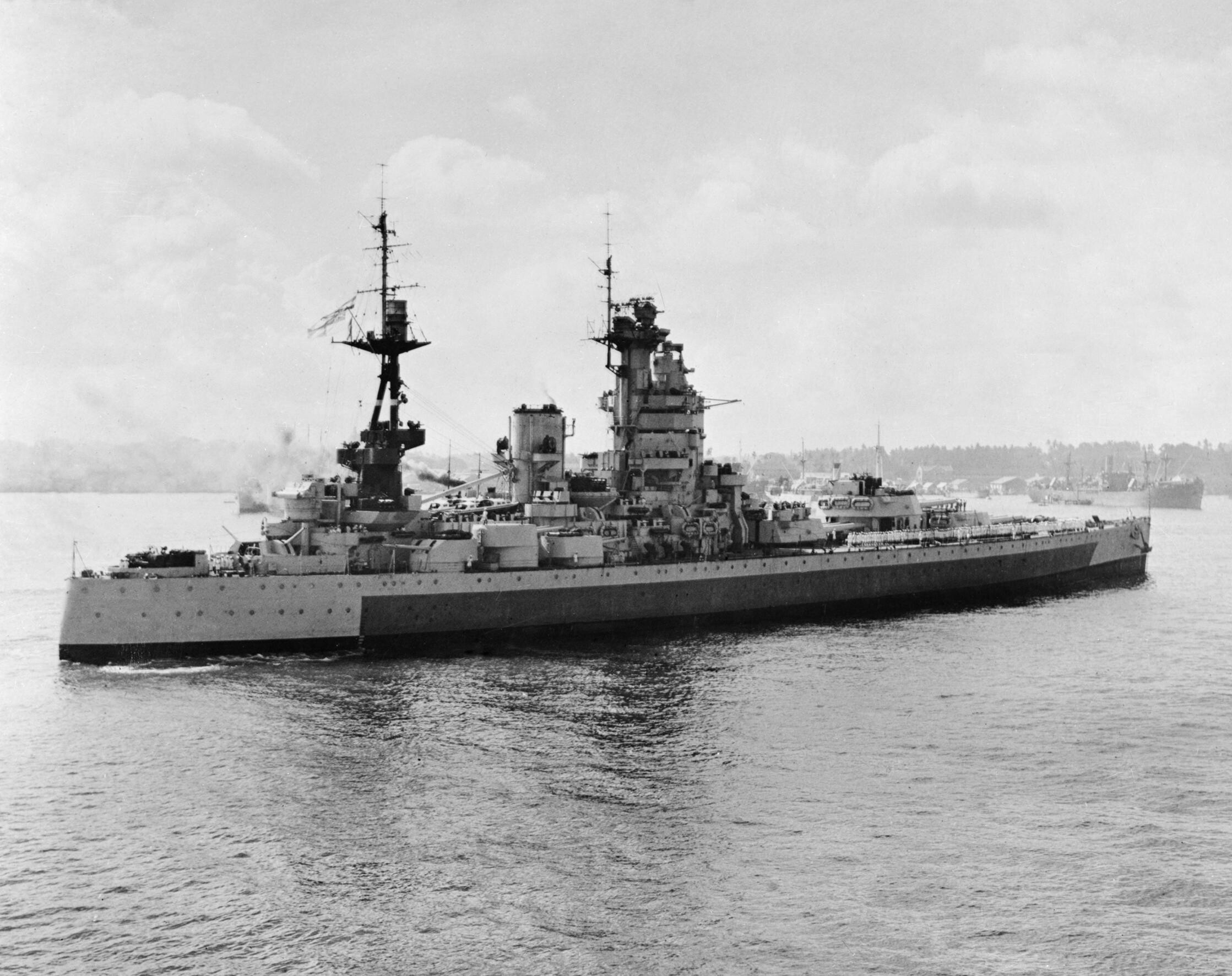
Nelson entering port in 1945

Nelson was relieved as flagship on 20 September and departed for home on 13 October. She arrived at Portsmouth on 17 November and became the flagship of the Home Fleet a week later. King George V replaced her as flagship on 9 April 1946 and Nelson became a training ship in July. When the Training Squadron was formed on 14 August, the ship became flagship of the Rear-Admiral that commanded the training battleships. She was relieved as flagship by the battleship Anson in October and became a private ship. Nelson was slightly damaged by a collision with the submarine Sceptre in Portland on 15 April 1947. The ship was placed in reserve on 20 October 1947 at Rosyth and was listed for disposal on 19 May 1948. From 4 June to 23 September, she was used as a target ship for 2,000-pound (910 kg) armour-piercing aerial bombs to evaluate their ability to penetrate the ship's armoured deck. Nelson was turned over to the British Iron & Steel Corporation on 5 January 1949 and was allocated to Thos. W. Ward for scrapping. The ship arrived at Inverkeithing on 15 March to begin demolition.
