= HMS Moth (1915) =

Gunboat of the Royal Navy

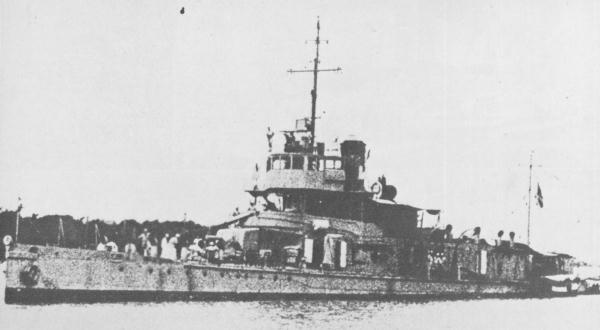
- During service as the Japanese Suma in 1942

History

United Kingdom
- Name: HMS Moth
- Ordered: 1915
- Builder: Sunderland Shipbuilding Company
- Laid down: 1915
- Launched: 9 October 1915
- Commissioned: 5 January 1916
- Out of service: 12 December 1941
- Identification: Pennant number: T69
- Fate: Scuttled 12 December 1941 at Hong Kong

General characteristics (HMS Moth)
- Class & type: Insect-class gunboat
- Displacement: 625 tons
- Length: 72.40 m (237 ft 6 in) (overall)
- Beam: 11.00 m (36 ft 1 in)
- Draft: 1.20 m (3 ft 11 in)
- Installed power: 2 × Yarrow water tube boilers; 2,000 shp (1,500 kW)
- Propulsion: 2 × North Eastern Marine Engineering Works vertical triple expansion turbines; 2 shafts
- Speed: 14.0 knots (25.9 km/h; 16.1 mph)
- Complement: 55
- Armament: See § Armaments

Empire of Japan
- Name: Suma (須磨)
- Namesake: Suma-ku, Kobe
- Builder: Navy 2nd Construction Department at Hong Kong
- Acquired: February 1942
- Commissioned: 1 July 1942
- Decommissioned: 10 May 1945
- Stricken: 11 May 1945
- Fate: Sunk 19 March 1945 by naval mine

General characteristics (Suma)
- Displacement: 645 tons
- Length: 72.40 m (237 ft 6 in) (Overall)
- Beam: 10.97 m (36 ft 0 in)
- Draft: 1.22 m (4 ft 0 in)
- Speed: 14.0 knots (16.1 mph; 25.9 km/h)
- Complement: 84 (March 1945)
- Armament: See § Armaments
- Armour: Partially armoured bridge

HMS Moth (Pennant number: T69) was an Insect-class gunboat of the Royal Navy. Entering service in 1916, Moth had a varied career with service in the Middle East, the White Sea and the Far East in two world wars. Scuttled in World War II during the invasion of Hong Kong, the ship was raised and put into service by the Imperial Japanese Navy as Suma (須磨). The ship remained active throughout the war, before striking a naval mine in the Yangtze River in 1945 and sinking.

== Armaments ==
| Dates | Armament |
HMS Moth
| 1916 (Original) | 2 × BL 6-inch Mk VII naval guns; 2 × QF 12-pdr 12 cwt AA guns; 6 × 7.7 mm Maxim machine guns |
| October 1938 | 2 × BL 6-inch Mk VII naval guns; 1 × QF 3-inch 20 cwt AA gun; 1 × QF 12-pdr 12 cwt anti-air gun; 8 × 7.7 mm Lewis machine guns |
Suma
| 3 October 1942 | 2 × BL 6-inch Mk VII naval guns; 2 × 40 mm Type 91 "BI" AA guns; 2 × 7.7 mm Type 92 machine guns |
| 9 October 1943 | 2 × BL 6-inch Mk VII naval guns; 2 × 40 mm Type 91 "BI" AA guns (Note: Forward gun fitted with a splinter shield.); 6 × 7.7 mm Type 92 machine guns |
| 27 May 1944 | 1 × BL 6-inch Mk VII gun; 1 × 8 cm 3rd Year Type Naval gun; 2 × 40 mm Type 91 "BI" AA guns; 2 × Twin 25 mm Type 96 AA guns; 2 × 13.2 mm Type 93 heavy MGs; 6 × 7.7 mm Type 92 machine guns |
| 12 March 1945 | 1 × BL 6-inch Mk VII naval gun; 1 × 76.2 mm 3rd Year Type naval gun; 2 × 40 mm Type 91 "BI" AA guns; 2 × Twin 25 mm Type 96 AA guns; 6 × 13 mm Type 93 heavy MGs; 2 × 7.7 mm Type 92 machine guns |

== Service history ==
=== Royal Navy service ===
HMS Moth was laid down during the first half of 1915 at the yards of the Sunderland Shipbuilding Company, with her sister ship Mantis. Moth was launched on 9 October 1915 and completed on 5 January 1916.

Moth was dispatched to the Middle East (Mesopotamia area) in 1916. During the Russian Revolution in 1918−1919, Moth participates in actions in Northern Russia with sister ships Cicala, Cockchafer, Cricket, and Glowworm in support of White Russian forces against the Bolsheviks. In July 1919, she was dispatched to the White Sea, returning back to the UK by October to avoid the winter freeze. On 17 January 1920, she had been reassigned to the China Station. (Note: Her edited logbooks and maps of her journeys for 1919 and 1920 can be viewed at naval-history.net.)

In December 1941, she became a member of the Far East fleet with Cicala at Hong Kong. On 8 December 1941, Moth and Cicala were in port during an air raid by the Imperial Japanese Army Air Force. Cicala was sunk on 21 December. Moth was in the dock for repairs, but with the fall of the city to the Japanese imminent, Moth sank on 12 December, when the ship’s drydock was scuttled.

=== Imperial Japanese Navy service ===
The Imperial Japanese Navy dispatched the Navy 2nd Construction Department (海軍第二工作部, Kaigun Dai-2 Kōsaku-Bu) to Hong Kong to investigate Moth, and on February 1942, she was refloated. She had a handover ceremony on 30 June 1942, attended by Vice-Admiral Masaichi Niimi. On the next day, after being considered to be salvaged, she began an extensive rebuild, which was completed by 20 July. On 14 July 1942, she was renamed Suma (須磨); (Note: Suma is a Japanese scenic spot appearing in The Tale of Genji.) registered in the Sasebo Naval District as a gunboat; and assigned to the China Area Fleet, 2nd China Expeditionary Fleet, 15th Squadron. Suma remained in Hong Kong for fitting out until 3 October 1942.

On 15 October 1942, Suma was reassigned to the Pearl River Basin Guard Fleet, to provide aid to SNLF troops in anti-insurgency operations. On the next day, she landed a 19-strong SNLF unit in Tai O village on Lantau Island. On 22 October 1942, she landed a 47-strong SNLF unit at Lai Chi Wo in the New Territories, Hong Kong. B-25 Mitchell medium bombers (from the 14th Air Force) attacked Hong Kong after midnight of 25 October 1942, Suma received no damage and fired back at the attacking bombers. She was attacked by B-25s on the next day, claiming to shot down one. On 30 December 1942, she was attacked by aircraft on the Yangtze River, suffering light damage.

Suma underwent a refit on 5–8 January 1943. She underwent repairs on 8 April 1943. The ship was drydocked at No. 2 Repair Facility for more repairs on 1–5 August, and another refit on 5–12 August, with trials conducted after. On 29 July 1943, she fired on US bombers during an air raid on Hong Kong, expending 78 40mm rounds and 210 7.7mm rounds. She was reassigned to the Yangtze River Area Base Force on 20 August 1943. Suma arrived in Kiangnan Shipyard, Shanghai to undergo hull repairs and refit from 1 September to 9 October 1943. The ship was attacked by three B-25s on 29 December 1943, and by two B-25s the next day receiving some damage, while shooting down one B-25. (Note: B-25D-15-NC, 41-30457, 11th Bombardment Squadron, 341st Bombardment Group, 14th Air Force, lost 30 December 1943; 4 KIA/BNR: William C. Arnold (Pilot), Harland B. Keating (Co-pilot))

Suma underwent a major upgrade at Mitsubishi Yangshupu Shipyard, Shanghai on 22 April 1944: A 76.2 mm 3rd Year Type gun replaced one of the 6-inch guns; New 25 mm Type 96 anti-air guns in twin mounts replaced both the fore and aft mounted 40 mm Type 91 guns; The 40 mm Type 91 guns were relocated to the bridge wings along with new 13.2 mm Type 93 heavy machine guns. On 11 June 1944, the ship was attacked by P-38 Lightnings and on 18 June, by three B-25Gs. On 26 December, she was attacked by seven P-51D Mustangs, with the aft 25 mm gun wrecked and 18 killed and four wounded. The aft gun was replaced and repairs made to the ship on the 28–30 December at Yanhu.

Suma was attacked by P-51s on 11 February 1945, when it claims downing one. The ship was repaired at Mitsubishi Yangshupu Shipyard, Shanghai from 17 February to 12 March 1945. She was active on the Yangtze River in anti-insurgency operations. On 19 March 1945, she struck a naval mine which was previously laid by 14th Air Force planes on 4 March at Anqing, and sank with a loss of 8 crewmen. Gunboat Narumi evacuated 40 wounded and 36 survivors.
