= Commander-in-Chief, China (Royal Navy) =

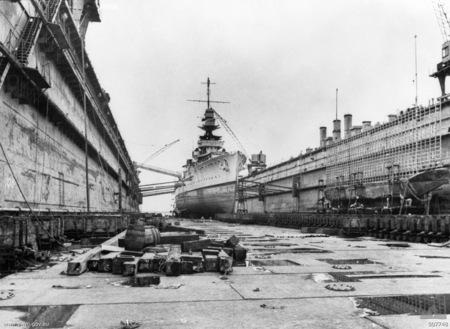
- A British Danae-class cruiser inside the Admiralty IX floating dry dock at Singapore Naval Base in September 1941
- Active: 1865–1941
- Country: United Kingdom
- Branch: Royal Navy
- Type: Naval station
- Part of: Admiralty
- Garrison/HQ: Singapore Naval Base (1865–1942, 1945–1971); HMS Tamar (1865–1941, 1945–1997); Wei Hai Wei station on Liugong Island (1898–1940)

The Commander-in-Chief, China, was the admiral in command of what was usually known as the China Station, at once both a British Royal Navy naval formation and its admiral in command. It was created in 1865 and deactivated in 1941.

From 1831 to 1865, the East Indies Station and the China Station were a single command known as the East Indies and China Station. The China Station, established in 1865, had as its area of responsibility the coasts of China and its navigable rivers, the western part of the Pacific Ocean, and the waters around the Dutch East Indies. The navy often co-operated with British commercial interests in this area.

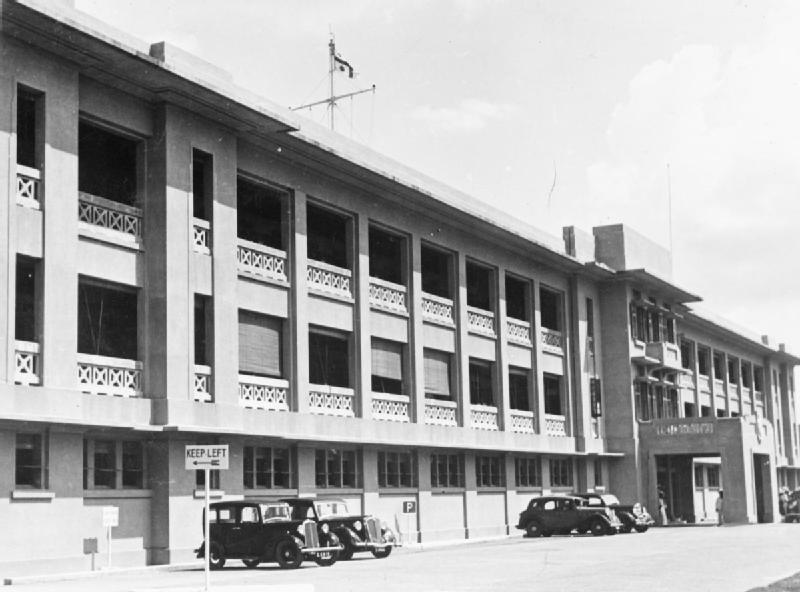
Navy Office, Singapore

The formation had bases at Singapore (Singapore Naval Base), HMS Tamar (1865–1941 and 1945–1997) in Hong Kong and Wei Hai (at Liugong Island) (1898–1940). The China Station complement usually consisted of several older light cruisers and destroyers, and the Chinese rivers were patrolled by a flotilla of suitable, shallow-draught gunboats, referred to as "China gunboats". Ships on this station usually had a distinctive livery of white hull and grey superstructure and funnels.

Between the two world wars, the Insect class gunboats were mainly used in the Far East and they were present during the Japanese invasion of China. In 1937, on the Yangtze river, the Japanese attacked Ladybird, firing on her from a shore battery. A U.S. gunboat, USS Panay was also attacked, by Japanese aircraft, and sunk. Ladybird sailed the 20 miles to the scene of the sinking, took on board some of the Panay survivors and took them to Shanghai. Scarab and Cricket were off Nanking in 1937 as the Japanese started to bomb the city.

In response to increased Japanese threats, the separate China Station was merged with the East Indies Station in December 1941 to form the Eastern Fleet.

== List of Commanders-in-Chief, China ==
No.	Commander-in-Chief		Term		
No.	Portrait	Name	Took office	Left office	Term length
Commander-in-Chief, China
1	Sir George King	Vice-Admiral; Sir George King (1809–1891)	1865	1867	~1 year
2	Sir Henry Keppel	Vice-Admiral; Sir Henry Keppel (1809–1904)	1867	1896	~1 year
3	Sir Henry Kellett	Vice-Admiral; Sir Henry Kellett (1806–1875)	1869	1871	~2 years
4	Sir Charles Shadwell	Vice-Admiral; Sir Charles Shadwell (1814–1886)	1871	1874	~3 years
5	Sir Alfred Ryder	Vice-Admiral; Sir Alfred Ryder (1820–1888)	1874	1877	~3 years
6	Sir Charles Hillyar	Vice-Admiral; Sir Charles Hillyar (1817–1888)	1877	1878	~1 year
7	Robert Coote	Vice-Admiral; Robert Coote (1820–1898)	1878	1881	~3 years
8	Sir George Willes	Vice-Admiral; Sir George Willes (1823–1901)	1881	1884	~3 years
9	Sir William Dowell	Vice-Admiral; Sir William Dowell (1825–1912)	1884	1885	~1 year
10	Sir Richard Hamilton	Vice-Admiral; Sir Richard Hamilton (1829–1912)	1885	1887	~2 years
11	Sir Nowell Salmon	Vice-Admiral; Sir Nowell Salmon (1835–1912)	1887	1890	~3 years
12	Sir Frederick Richards	Vice-Admiral; Sir Frederick Richards (1833–1912)	1890	1892	~2 years
13	Sir Edmund Fremantle	Vice-Admiral; Sir Edmund Fremantle (1836–1929)	1892	1895	~3 years
14	Sir Alexander Buller	Vice-Admiral; Sir Alexander Buller (1834–1909)	1895	1897	~2 years
15	Sir Edward Seymour	Vice-Admiral; Sir Edward Seymour (1840–1929)	1897	1901	~4 years
16	Sir Cyprian Bridge	Vice-Admiral; Sir Cyprian Bridge (1839–1924)	1901	1904	~3 years
17	Sir Gerard Noel	Vice-Admiral; Sir Gerard Noel (1845–1918)	1904	1906	~2 years
18	Sir Arthur Moore	Vice-Admiral; Sir Arthur Moore (1847–1934)	1906	1908	~2 years
19	Sir Hedworth Meux	Vice-Admiral; Sir Hedworth Meux (1856–1929)	1908	1910	~2 years
20	Sir Alfred Winsloe	Vice-Admiral; Sir Alfred Winsloe (1852–1931)	1910	1913	~3 years
21	Sir Martyn Jerram	Vice-Admiral; Sir Martyn Jerram (1858–1933)	1913	1915	~2 years
22	Sir Lowther Grant	Vice-Admiral; Sir Lowther Grant (1864–1929)	1916	1917	~1 year
23	Sir Frederick Tudor	Rear Admiral; Sir Frederick Tudor (1863–1946)	1917	1919	~2 years
24	Sir Alexander Duff	Vice-Admiral; Sir Alexander Duff (1862–1933)	24 July 1919	1922	~3 years
25	Sir Arthur Leveson	Admiral; Sir Arthur Leveson (1868–1929)	10 September 1922	November 1924	~2 years
26	Sir Allan Everett	Rear Admiral; Sir Allan Everett (1868–1938)	November 1924	1925	~1 year
27	David Anderson	Rear Admiral; David Anderson (1874–1936); Acting	1925	22 April 1925	~4 months
28	Sir Edwyn Alexander-Sinclair	Vice-Admiral; Sir Edwyn Alexander-Sinclair (1865–1945)	22 April 1925	8 November 1926	1 year, 200 days
29	Sir Reginald Tyrwhitt	Vice-Admiral; Sir Reginald Tyrwhitt (1870–1951)	8 November 1926	28 November 1928	2 years, 20 days
30	Sir Arthur Waistell	Vice-Admiral; Sir Arthur Waistell (1873–1953)	28 November 1928	28 February 1931	4 years, 92 days
31	Sir Howard Kelly	Vice-Admiral; Sir Howard Kelly (1873–1952)	28 February 1931	11 March 1933	2 years, 11 days
32	Sir Charles Little	Vice-Admiral; Sir Charles Little (1882–1973)	11 January 1936	5 February 1938	2 years, 25 days
33	Sir Percy Noble	Admiral; Sir Percy Noble (1880–1955)	5 February 1938	1940	~2 years
34	Sir Tom Phillips	Admiral; Sir Tom Phillips (1888–1941)	November 1941	2 December 1941	~1 month

== See also ==
- List of Eastern Fleet ships
- List of fleets and major commands of the Royal Navy
