= HMS Tarantula =

Gunboat of the Royal Navy

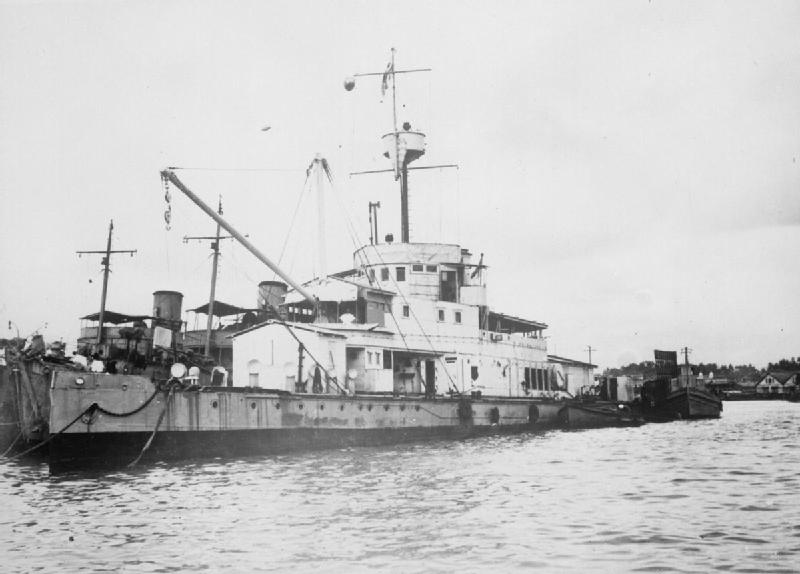
- HMS Tarantula at Trincomalee in 1943

History

United Kingdom
- Name: HMS Tarantula
- Builder: Wood, Skinner & Co, Newcastle upon Tyne, UK
- Launched: 1915
- Fate: Sunk as target 1 May 1946

General characteristics
- Class & type: Insect-class gunboat
- Displacement: 625 long tons (635 t)
- Length: 237 ft 6 in (72.39 m)
- Beam: 36 ft (11 m)
- Draught: 4 ft (1.2 m)
- Propulsion: 2 shaft VTE engines, 2 Yarrow type mixed firing boilers 2,000 ihp (1,500 kW)
- Speed: 14 knots (26 km/h; 16 mph)
- Complement: 55
- Armament: As built: 2 × BL 6-inch Mk VII guns; 2 × 12-pounder guns; 6 × .303-inch Maxim machine guns; Variations: 1 × QF 2-pounder "Pom-Pom"; 1 × QF 3-inch anti-aircraft gun; .303-inch Lewis machine gun; Oerlikon 20 mm cannon
- Armour: Improvised

HMS Tarantula was an Insect-class gunboat of the Royal Navy. Launched in 1915, the gunboat saw service in both the First and Second World Wars. Tarantula served with the Tigris flotilla in 1916, retaking a former British gunboat that had previously been captured by the Ottoman Empire. After the First World War, Tarantula was towed to China, joining the China Station, eventually ending up at Trincomalee, Ceylon during the Second World War. After the end of the war, the vessel was sunk as a gunnery target in the Bay of Bengal in 1946.

== Operational history ==
In 1916 Tarantula along with three other gunboats were towed out to join the Royal Navy's Tigris flotilla and under the command of H.G. Sherbrooke successfully participated in a series of engagements en route to Baghdad. On 26 February 1917 Tarantula recaptured the Ottoman gunboat Suleiman Pak in a small skirmish known as the Battle of Nahr-al-Kalek on 26 February 1917, in the immediate aftermath of the Second Battle of Kut. Suleiman Pak was originally the British Fly-class gunboat HMS Firefly, which the Ottomans had captured in December 1915 after she grounded and a shell through her boiler disabled her.

After the ending of the First World War Tarantula was towed to China and joined the China Station. Around 1940 she went from Singapore to Trincomalee, Ceylon, where as a result of disrepair she served as offices. It was in this capacity that in 1944, she served briefly as Admiral Bruce Fraser's flagship of the British Pacific Fleet. She was sunk as a gunnery target in the Bay of Bengal off Trincomalee by the destroyers HMS Carron and HMS Carysfort on 1 May 1946.

== Publications ==
- Colledge, J. J.; Warlow, Ben (2006) [1969]. Ships of the Royal Navy: The Complete Record of All Fighting Ships of the Royal Navy from the 15th Century to the Present (3rd Rev ed.). London: Chatham Publishing. ISBN 978-1-86176-281-8. OCLC 67375475.
