= HMS Cockchafer (1915) =

Royal Navy gunboat

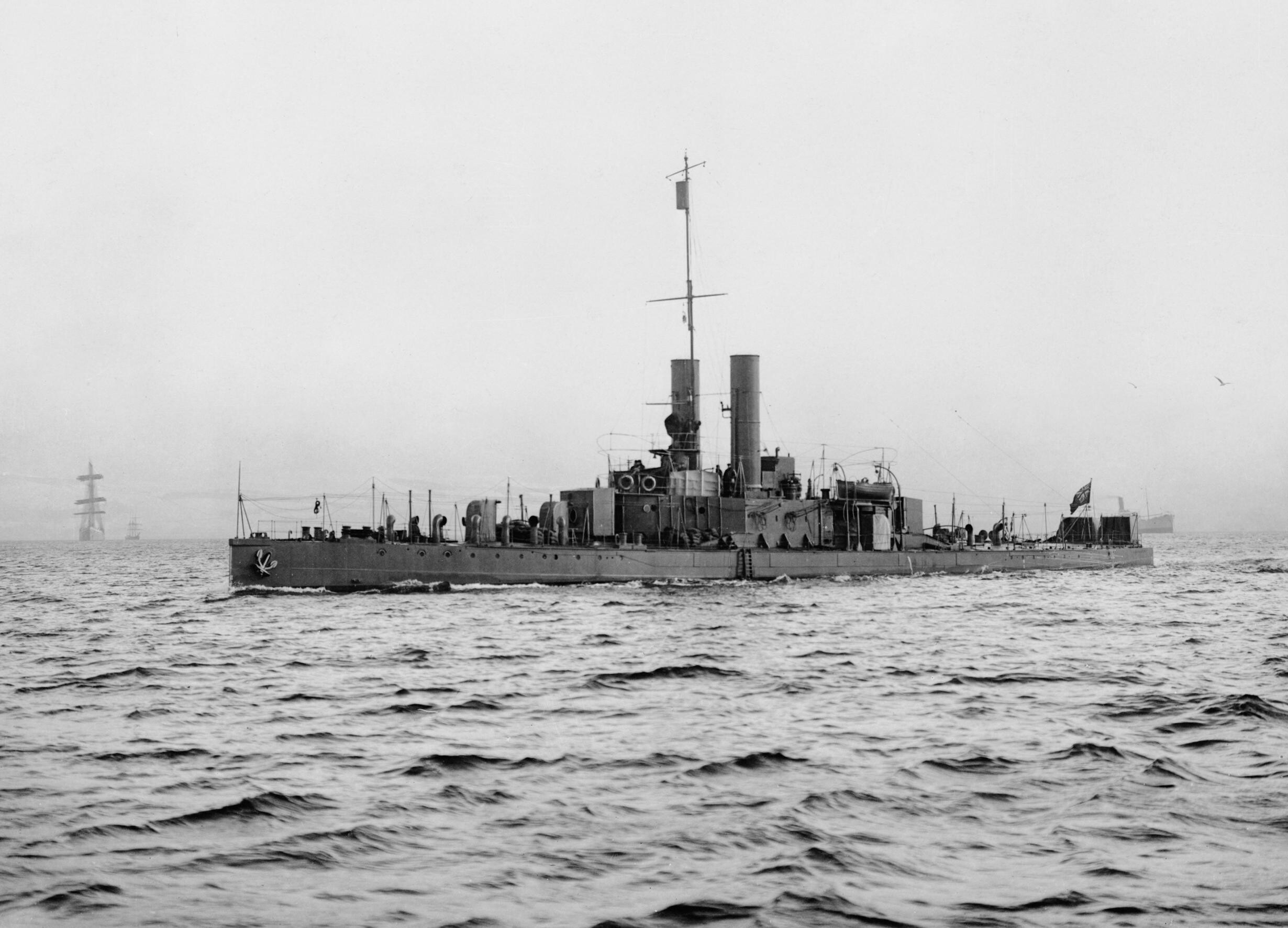
- Cockchafer underway accompanied by Cricket, Glowworm and Cicala

History

United Kingdom
- Name: HMS Cockchafer
- Namesake: Cockchafer
- Ordered: 1915
- Builder: Barclay Curle
- Laid down: 1915
- Launched: 17 December 1915
- Honours and awards: Sicily 1943, Mediterranean 1940–1945
- Fate: Broken up 1949 at Singapore

General characteristics
- Class & type: Insect-class gunboat
- Displacement: 625 tons
- Length: 72.40 m (237 ft 6 in) (overall)
- Beam: 11.00 m (36 ft 1 in)
- Draft: 1.20 m (3 ft 11 in)
- Propulsion: 2 × Yarrow water tube boilers, 2 × North Eastern Marine Engineering Works expansion turbines, 2 shafts, 2,000 shp (1,500 kW)
- Speed: 14.0 knots (16.1 mph; 25.9 km/h)
- Complement: 55
- Armament: (1916); 2 × BL 6 inch Mk VII; 2 × 12 pdr. gun; 6 × .303 British Maxim guns; (October 1938); 2 × BL 6 inch Mk VII; 1 × 12 pdr. AA gun; 1 × QF 2 pdr. naval gun; 8 × .303 British Lewis guns

HMS Cockchafer was a Royal Navy Insect-class gunboat. She was built by Barclay Curle and launched on 17 December 1915 as the fourth Royal Navy ship to carry this name. The Insect class was originally designed for service on the River Danube but most of them spent much of their service on Chinese rivers.

== First World War ==
During the First World War, Cockchafer was assigned to the defence of the south east coast of England, based at Brightlingsea. During the Russian Civil War, she served with some of her sister ships as part of the British intervention forces fighting in support of White Russian forces on the Dvina River from 1918 to 1919. On 17 January 1920, the Insect-class ships Cricket, Cockchafer, Moth, Mantis and Cicala set out from Chatham, England for China. Cockchafer was stationed on the Yangtze River where her duties were patrolling and protection of British nationals and interests in China.

== Wanhsien Incident ==
One significant event which Cockchafer was involved in was the Wanhsien Incident in August and September 1926. Wanhsien, now known as Wanzhou District, is a port on the Yangtze River about 1,500 miles (2,400 km) upstream from Shanghai. The local warlord, Marshal Wu Pei Fu controlled the area and his local commander was General Yang Sen.

Following friction earlier in the year, General Yang's troops seized the British merchant ship, SS Wanhsien in August 1926, which belonged to The China Navigation Company of the Swire Group. The crew of Cockchafer heard the British crew calling for help and sent an officer and boarding party to Wanhsien to investigate. They found the ship occupied by 100 Chinese soldiers. The Navy party obtained the release of the ship after a heated argument.

On 29 August 1926, China Navigation Co. ship, SS Wanliu suddenly made a U-turn while a wooden boat full of Chinese soldiers, guns, bullets and allowances passed by. The wave caused by the movement of Wanliu capsized the wooden boat. 58 soldiers were drowned. Thousands of bullets, hundreds of guns and some allowances were lost. Wanliu steamed upstream while the Chinese soldiers aboard attempted to capture the ship. They were unable to do so by the time Wanliu reached Wanhsien where Cockchafer sent a boarding party to remove the soldiers.

The reports about the escape of Wanliu reached General Yang whose troops captured SS Wanhsien again. The British officers were held aboard. Another British merchant ship SS Wantung was also captured. Chinese troops with artillery gathered on the shore. General Yang seized several of Cockchafer's Chinese crewmembers who were ashore and one was killed in full view of the rest of the crew. Yang refused to negotiate with the commander of Cockchafer and the senior officer on the Upper Yangtze, commander of Widgeon headed for Wanhsien while Cockchafer remained with Wanhsien in a standoff with the overwhelming numbers of Chinese troops.

On 1 September 1926 Widgeon arrived at Wanhsien but negotiations did not go well and the rear admiral on the Yangtze decided that the matter would have to be settled by force. A British merchant ship, SS Kiawo, was camouflaged and armoured and manned by a naval crew gathered from Cockchafer, the light cruiser Despatch, Scarab and Mantis boarded Kiawo and she sailed on 4 September 1926.

In the evening of 5 September 1926 Kiawo arrived in sight of Wanhsien. The plan was to board and re-take SS Wanhsien and SS Wantung while Widgeon and Cockchafer provided covering fire. Kiawo came under fire from the Chinese troops ashore. She came alongside Wanhsien and boarded under fire. The boarding party rescued the British seaman held on board after fierce fighting.

In the meantime, Chinese troops onshore and aboard Wantung opened fire on Cockchafer and Widgeon which returned fire. The boarding party aboard SS Wanhsien suffered a number of casualties including the senior British officer from Despatch and Cockchafer's sub-lieutenant who were killed. Having rescued the British merchant seamen on board SS Wanhsien, the attacking force retired to SS Kiawo. After an hour of fighting, the action was discontinued and the two merchant ships were abandoned. The British ships then retired having rescued the crews, but having lost the ships.

The British ships caused casualties of nearly a thousand Chinese civilians and soldiers in the Wanhsien Incident. Thousands of shops and homes were destroyed by shells. In the end, General Yang was pressured to release SS Wanhsien and SS Wantung. It is unclear whether the British paid any compensation.

== Second World War service ==
In 1939 Cockchafer started the war still on Yangtze River patrol. After consideration for conversion to a minelayer, she was then transferred to the East Indies Squadron. In 1941 she assisted in the landings of British and Indian Army troops at Basra, Iraq during the Anglo-Iraqi War. She played host to the regent of Iraq, Amir Abdul Illah who had been deposed and fled an assassination plot in Baghdad.

She also played a part in the Anglo-Soviet invasion of Iran, which was the invasion of Iran by British and Commonwealth forces and the Soviet Union, codenamed Operation Countenance, from 25 August 1941 to 17 September 1941. The purpose of the invasion was to secure Iranian oil fields and ensure supply lines (see Persian Corridor) for the Soviets fighting against Nazi Germany on the Eastern Front.

In 1943, Cockchafer was transferred to the Mediterranean Fleet at Malta. She took part in support operations for Operation Husky, the invasion of Sicily. Following the invasion of Italy and the invasion of Elba, Cockchafer was employed on harbour duties in Taranto in late 1944. In 1945, she was despatched to the Eastern Fleet in the Indian Ocean again to support operations in Burma. After the end of the war against Japan in August 1945, she was sent to Singapore where she was placed in reserve. In 1949 as the last surviving Insect-class gunboat, she was sold for scrap and broken up.
