= Fly-class gunboat =

1915 class of British gunboats

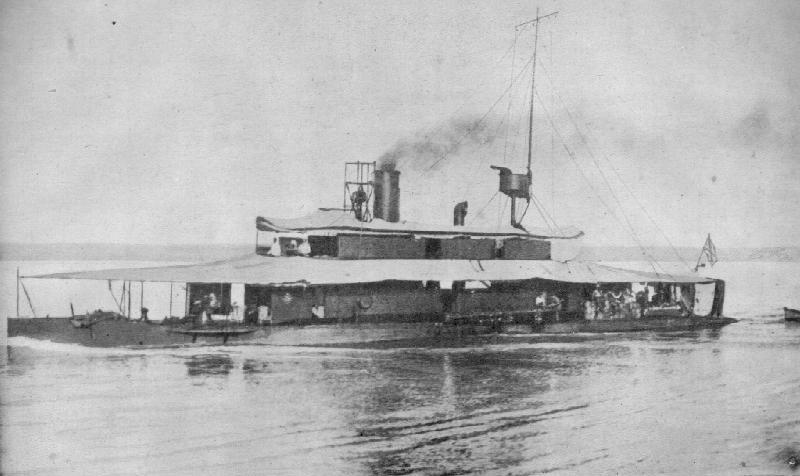

Class overview
- Name: Fly class
- Builders: Yarrow Shipbuilders
- Operators: Royal Navy (1915–1918); British Army (1918–1924)
- In service: 1915–1924
- Completed: 16
- Lost: 3
- Retired: 13

General characteristics
- Type: River gunboat
- Displacement: 98 long tons (100 t)
- Length: 126 ft (38 m)
- Beam: 20 ft (6.1 m)
- Draught: 2 ft (0.61 m)
- Propulsion: 1 shaft VTE, single yarrow type mixed firing boiler, 175 ihp (130 kW)
- Speed: 9.5 kn (10.9 mph; 17.6 km/h)
- Complement: 22
- Armament: 1 × 4-inch (102-mm) gun; 1 × 12-pounder (76-mm) gun; 1 × 6-pounder (57-mm) gun (some); 1 × 3-pounder (47-mm) gun; 1 × 2-pounder (40-mm) pom-pom; 4 or 5 machine-guns

The Fly-class river gunboats (or small China gunboats), collectively often referred to as the "Tigris gunboat flotilla", were a class of small well-armed Royal Navy vessels designed to patrol the Tigris river during the Mesopotamian Campaign during the First World War (the China name was to disguise their function). (Note: The Insect-class gunboats were "large China gunboats".)

== Design ==
They were fitted with one triple expansion steam engine driving one propeller housed in a tunnel to facilitate a very shallow [2 ft (61 cm)] draught. The boats were designed to be dismantled and re-assembled.

== Deployment ==
The vessels were built by Yarrow Shipbuilders at Scotstoun, Glasgow in 1915 and 1916 and shipped to Abadan in sections where they were assembled. They served with the Royal Navy patrolling the Tigris River until being transferred to the Army during 1918. They were sold off beginning 1923.

The Ottomans captured Firefly in December 1915 after she grounded and a shell through her boiler disabled her; her crew was evacuated. The Ottomans took her into service as Suleiman Pak. HMS Tarantula recaptured her in a small skirmish known as the Battle of Nahr-al-Kalek on 26 February 1917, in the immediate aftermath of the Second Battle of Kut.

== Vessels ==
Vessels with the prefix "HM Gunboat"

- Blackfly
- Butterfly
- Caddisfly
- Cranefly
- Dragonfly
- Firefly
- Gadfly
- Grayfly
- Greenfly
- Hoverfly
- Mayfly
- Sawfly
- Sedgefly
- Snakefly
- Stonefly
- Waterfly

== See also ==
- Mesopotamian campaign
- Tigris River
