= USS Panay incident =

Japanese attack on a US gunboat in 1937

Coordinates: 31°41′12″N 118°26′12″E

- Part of the Battle of Nanjing in the Second Sino-Japanese War and the interwar period
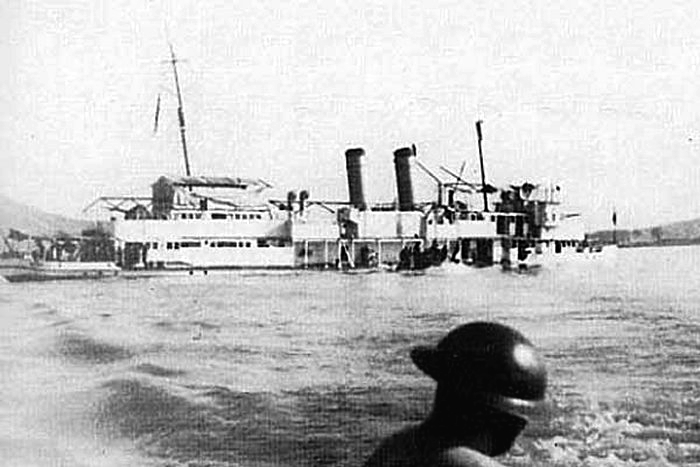
- USS Panay sinking after Japanese air attack. Nanjing, China.
Date	12 December 1937
Location	Yangtze River, off Nanjing, Republic of China
Result	Japanese victory

Belligerents
United States	Japan

Commanders and leaders
Captain James J. Hughes (WIA)	Shigeharu Murata; Okumiya Masatake

Strength
1 gunboat; 3 river tankers	13 aircraft

Casualties and losses
1 gunboat sunk; 3 river tankers destroyed; 3 Americans killed; 48 Americans wounded	1 killed
- Civilian casualties: 1 American killed, 5 Americans wounded; an unknown number of Chinese passengers killed and injured

The USS Panay incident was a Japanese bombing attack on the U.S. Navy river gunboat Panay and three Standard Oil Company tankers on the Yangtze River near the Chinese capital of Nanjing on 12 December 1937. Japan and the United States were not at war at the time. The boats were part of an American naval operation called the Yangtze Patrol, which began following the joint British, French, and American victory in the Second Opium War.

The bombing raid resulted in the sinking of Panay as well as the deaths of three Americans on board, plus an unknown but likely high casualty toll amongst the Chinese passengers in the three river tankers.

Public reaction was mixed in the U.S., with Franklin D. Roosevelt weighing various diplomatic and military responses only to settle for an apology and compensation.

The Japanese claimed that they did not see the large U.S. flags painted on the deck and canvases of the gunboat. Tokyo officially apologized and paid a cash indemnity of US$2.2 million. The settlement mollified some of the U.S. anger, and newspapers called the matter closed. However, camera footage taken during the attack showed Japanese aircraft flying so low near Panay that the pilots' faces were visible, providing "potent evidence that the mistaken identity claim was not true."

The attack was not an isolated case in the Battle of Nanjing. In addition to Panay and her consort of three tankers, Japanese aircraft and land forces attacked a multitude of other vessels belonging to the Western powers along the Yangtze near Nanjing.

== Background ==
A flat-bottomed craft built in Shanghai specifically for river duty, Panay served as part of the US Navy's Yangtze Patrol in the Asiatic Fleet, which was responsible for patrolling the Yangtze River to protect American lives and property in China.

After invading China in the summer of 1937, Japanese forces had fought their way to the city of Nanjing in the early weeks of December. The Japanese then began a fierce attack on the city and its surrounding region, which would later culminate in the infamous massacre of hundreds of thousands of civilians and prisoners of war.

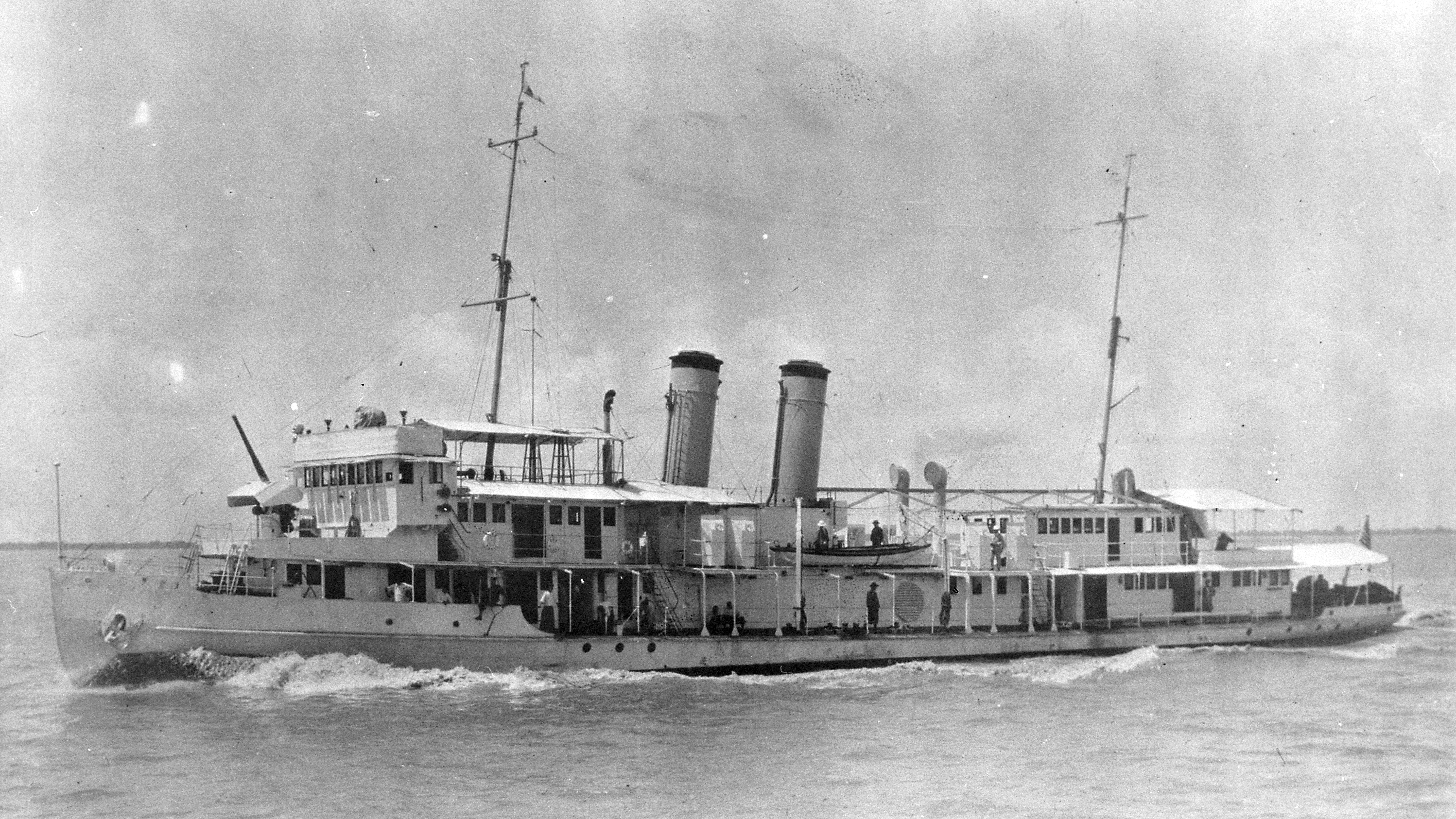
USS Panay underway during the standardization trial off Woosung, China, on 30 August 1928.

Since November, Panay had been evacuating U.S. citizens from the battle zone around Nanjing. On 11 December, Panay evacuated some of the last remaining Americans from the city, bringing the number of people aboard to five officers, 54 enlisted men, four US embassy staff, and 10 civilians, including Universal Newsreel cameraman Norman Alley, Fox Movietone News cameraman Eric Mayell, The New York Times's Norman Soong, Collier's Weekly correspondent Jim Marshall, La Stampa correspondent Sandro Sandri and Corriere della Sera correspondent Luigi Barzini Jr.

Panay was also tasked with escorting three Standard Oil tankers, Mei Ping, Mei An, and Mei Hsia, which were carrying some 800 Chinese employees of Standard Vacuum Oil and their families.

== Attack ==
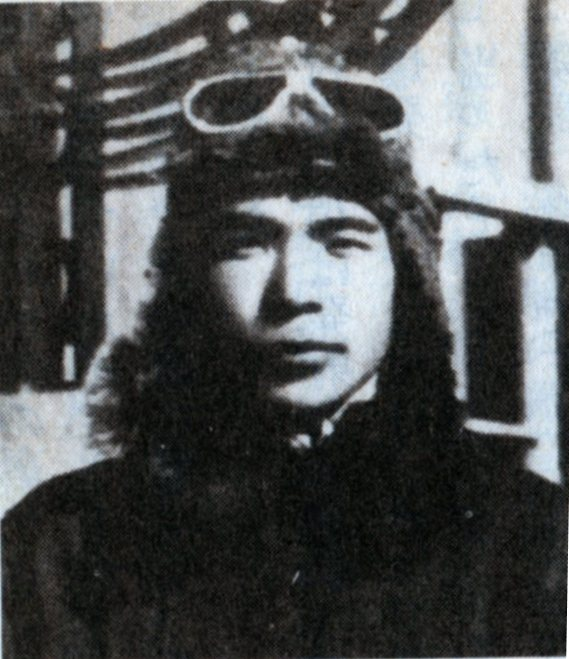
Lt Shigeharu Murata, who led the attack on Panay

On the morning of the 12th, Japanese air forces stationed near Nanjing received information that fleeing Chinese forces were in the area in ten large steamers and a large number of junks and that they were between 12 and 25 miles (19 and 40 km) upstream from Nanjing. Japanese naval aircraft led by Lieutenant Okumiya Masatake and Lieutenant Shigeharu Murata (who would lead torpedo bombers at the Attack on Pearl Harbor four years later) departed from Changzhou.

While anchored some 28 miles upstream from Nanjing, Panay and her three consorts, came under attack by the Japanese formations. The Panay was clearly marked and identified with two large American flags painted on its canvas awnings.

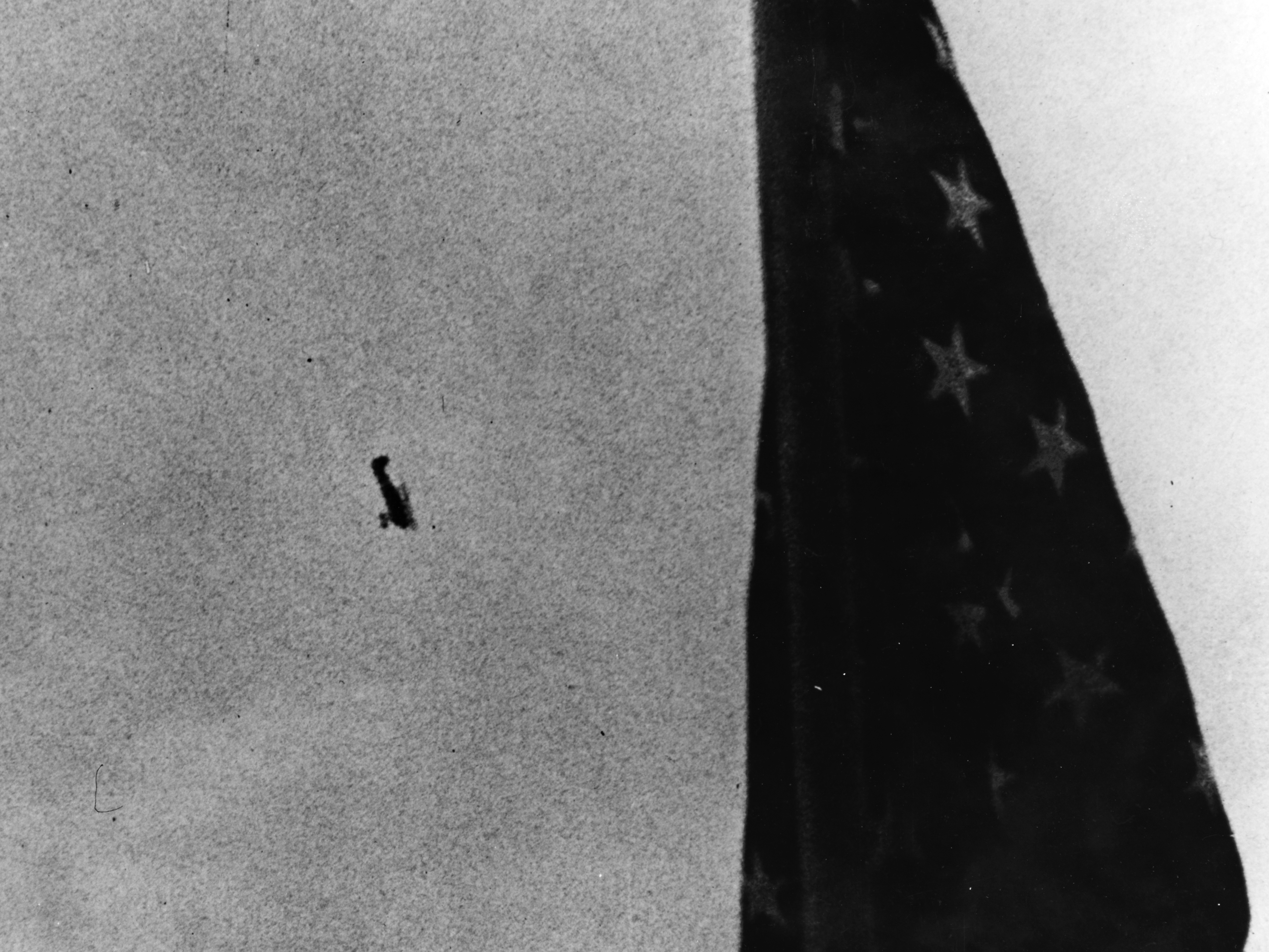
A frame from a newsreel which caught a Japanese plane attacking Panay in China

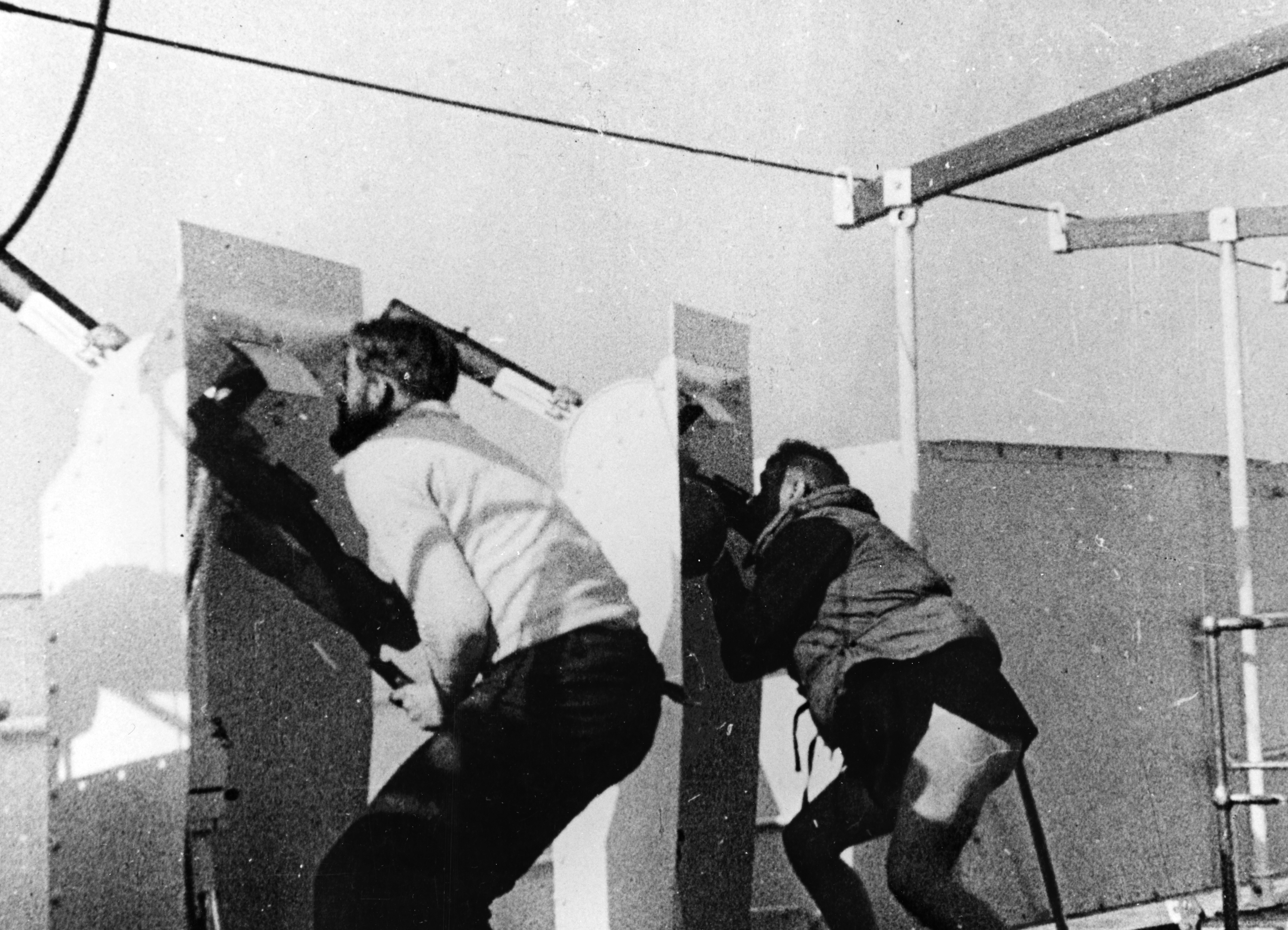
American gunners return fire at Japanese aircraft

Panay was hit by two of the eighteen 132 lb (60 kg) bombs dropped by three Yokosuka B4Y Type-96 bombers from high altitude, and then strafed by nine Nakajima A4N Type-95 fighters at low altitude. The first bomb split the Panay's foremast and disabled its forward gun. Shrapnel from several of the bombs that exploded near the vessel damaged the ship's hull and injured crew on the deck. Several Americans manned a 30-caliber machine gun on board and returned fire at the Japanese but did not hit any of the aircraft.

At 2 pm, facing irreparable damage and grievous injuries amongst the crew, Lieutenant Arthur Anders gave the order to abandon ship, and evacuated the crew and civilians onto two motorboats, the vast majority of them wounded. Planes also machine-gunned these small boats taking the wounded ashore, and several more survivors were wounded. According to Lieutenant J. W. Geist, an officer aboard Panay, "the day before we told the Japanese army in the area who we were", and three U.S. flags were plainly visible on the ship. The Times correspondent Colin MacDonald, who had also been aboard Panay, saw an Imperial Japanese Army small boat machine-gun Panay as it was sinking in spite of the American flag painted on the side of the ship. Since Japanese planes continued to circle overhead, survivors cowered knee-deep in mud in a swamp.

Panay's lifeboats were machine-gunned by Japanese fighter planes in the attack. As the ship sank, Japanese colonel Kingoro Hashimoto, who was in the immediate vicinity, ordered his artillery to fire on Panay. Hashimoto also ordered his troops to fire on British vessels whose identities he knew.

At 3:54 pm, Panay sank as a result of the attack. Storekeeper First Class Charles Lee Ensminger, Standard Oil tanker captain Carl H. Carlson and Italian reporter Sandro Sandri were killed, Coxswain Edgar C. Hulsebus died later that night. Forty-three sailors and five civilians were wounded.

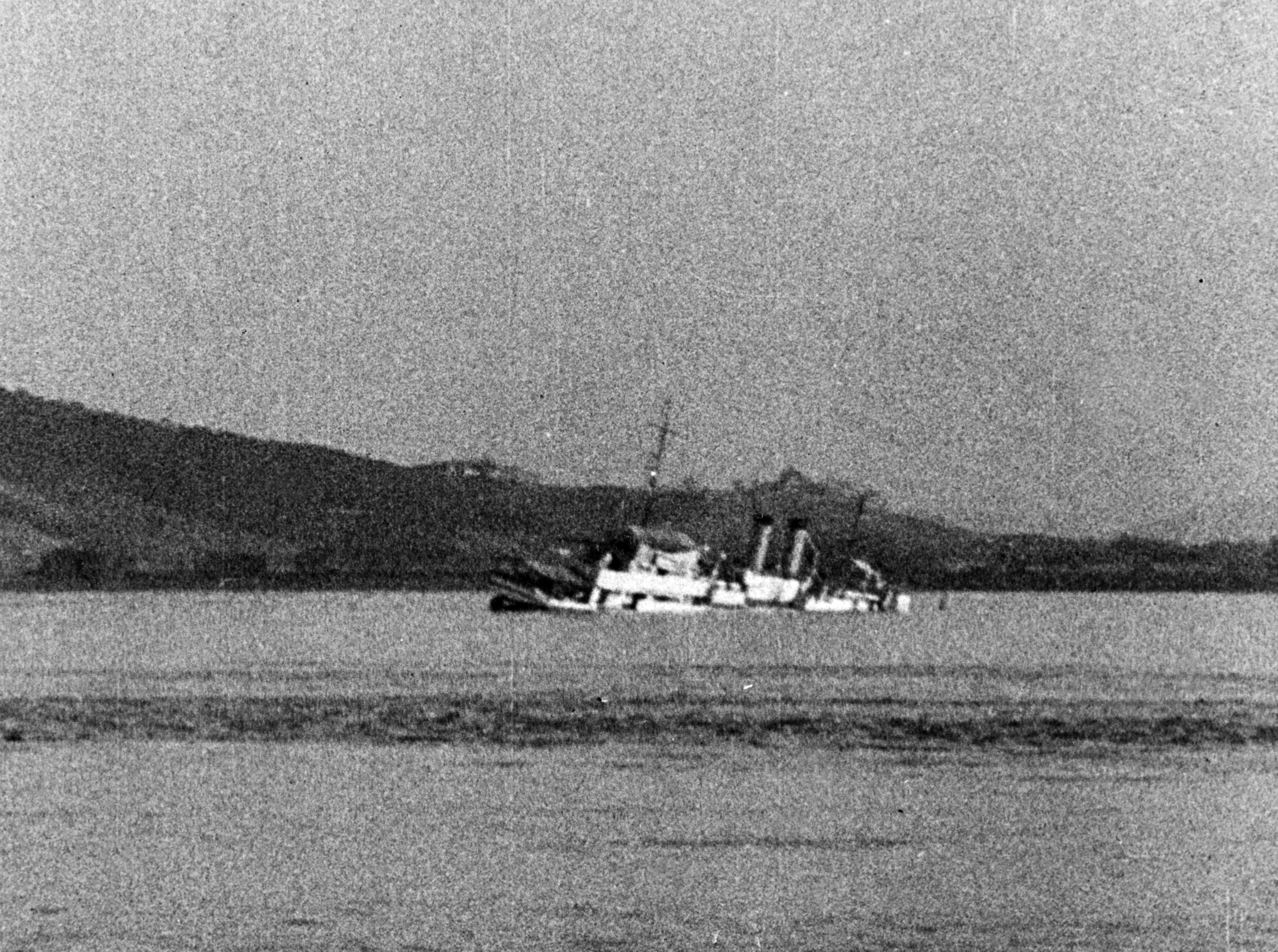
Panay listing to starboard before sinking

The three Standard Oil tankers were also bombed and destroyed, and the captain of Mei An and many Chinese civilian passengers were killed, although the number was not recorded in Standard Oil's Records. Also lost were two of four smaller company craft elsewhere by Japanese attacks. The vessels had been helping to evacuate the families of Standard Oil's employees and agents from Nanjing during the Japanese attack on that city.

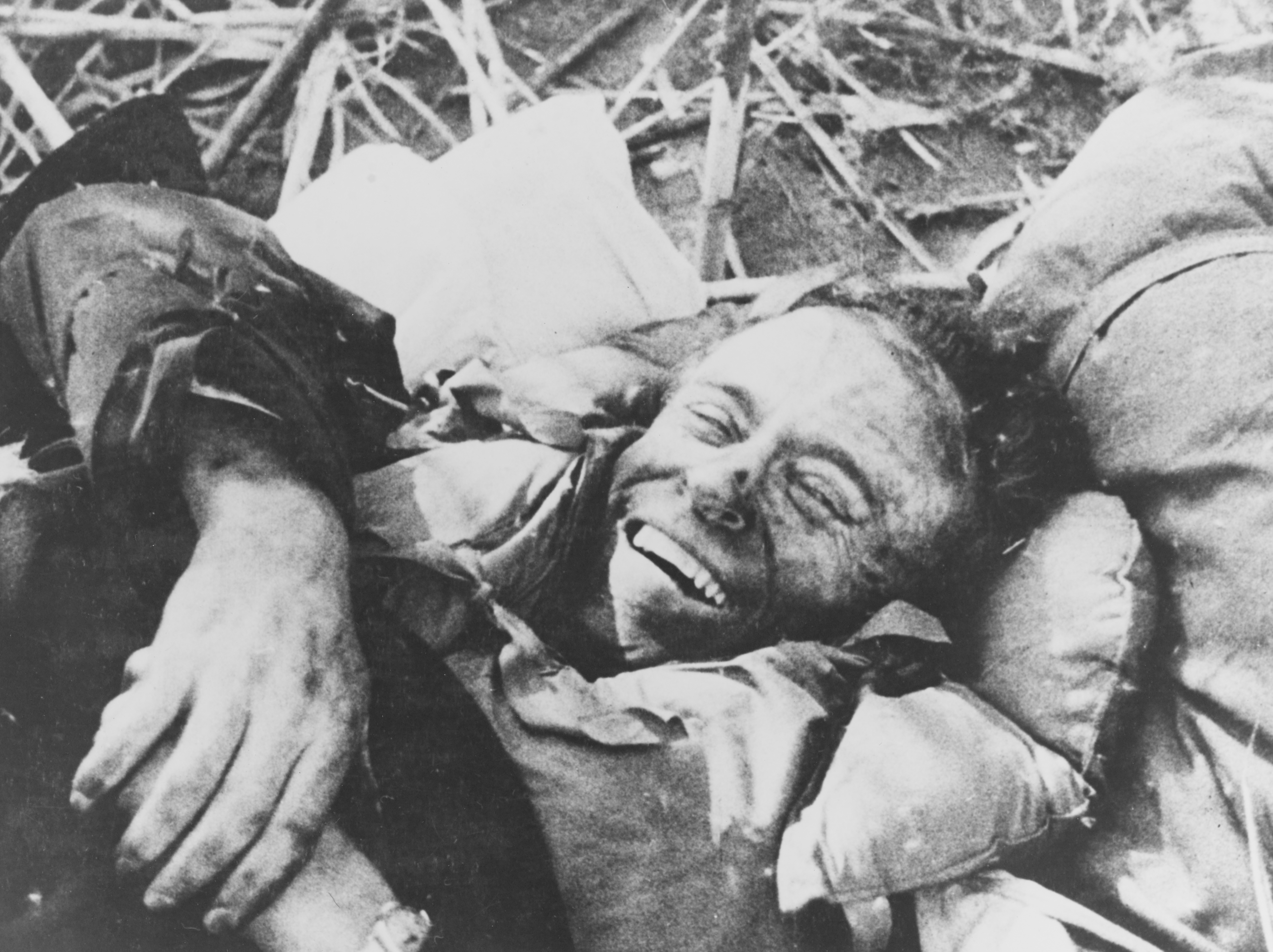
Lieutenant Commander James J. Hughes, USN, after being wounded in the attack.

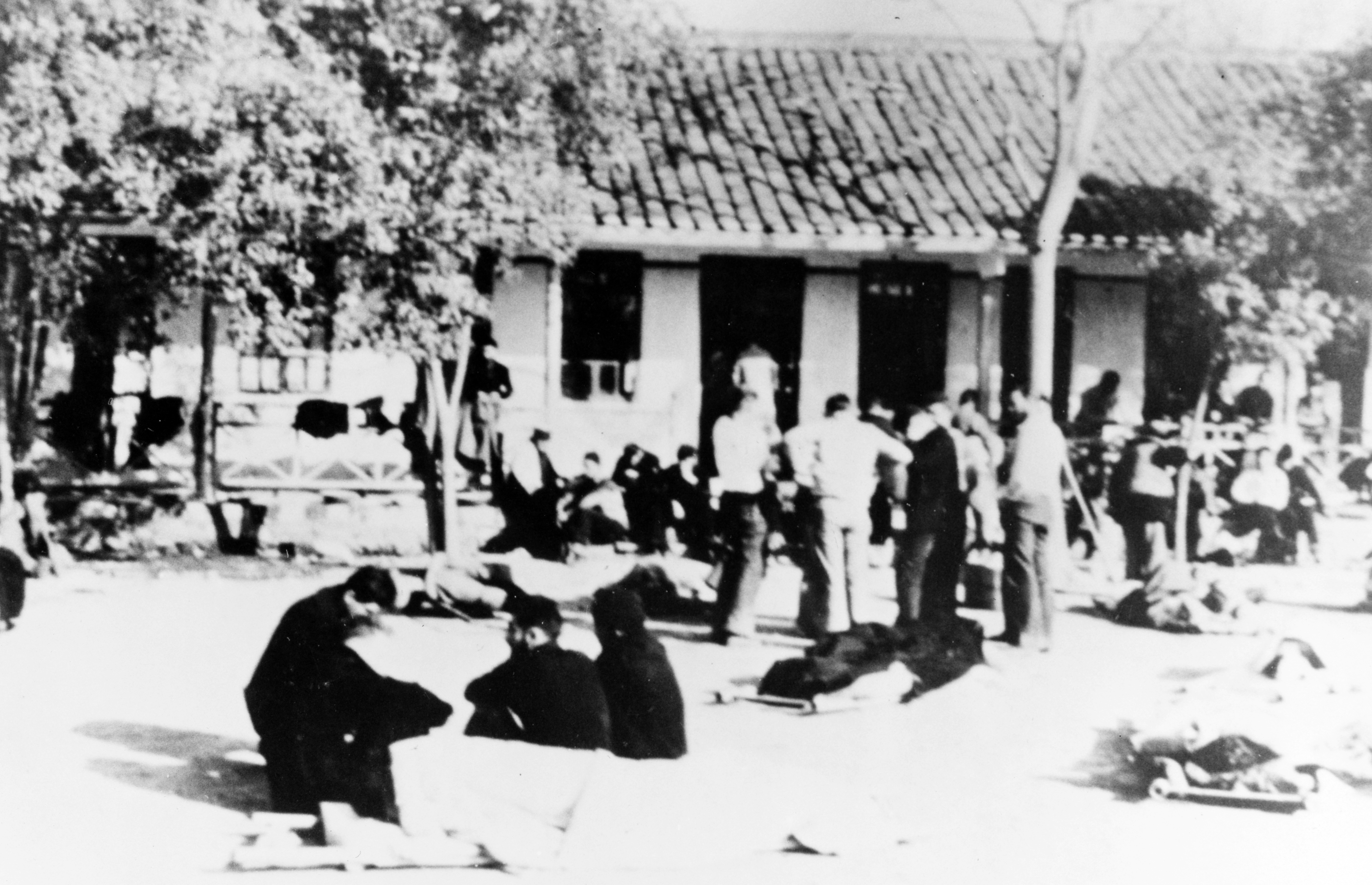
Survivors in a local village, 13 December, one day after the attack

Two newsreel cameramen, Norman Alley of Universal Newsreel and Eric Mayell of Fox Movietone News, were aboard Panay during the attack; they were able to film parts of the attack including Japanese aircraft on low-level strafing runs and, after reaching shore, the sinking of the ship in the middle of the river. The survivors of the attack then waded through knee-deep mud to a nearby village, carrying those too badly wounded to walk.

The survivors were later taken aboard the American vessel Oahu and the British gunboats HMS Ladybird and Bee. Earlier the same day, a Japanese shore battery had fired on Ladybird. The survivors coped with near freezing nights wearing inadequate clothing along with no food. It took three days to move the sixteen wounded to the safety of several British and American ships.

The Japanese pilots who attacked Panay would also bomb the British vessel SS Wantung later that same day.

== Diplomacy ==
The aftermath of the Panay sinking was a nervous time for the American ambassador to Japan, Joseph C. Grew. Grew, whose experience in the foreign service spanned over 30 years, "remembered the USS Maine", the U.S. Navy ship that blew up in Havana Harbor in 1898. The sinking of Maine had propelled the U.S. into the Spanish–American War, and ambassador Grew hoped the sinking of Panay would not be a similar catalyst for the severance of diplomatic ties and war with Japan.

The Japanese government took full responsibility for sinking Panay but continued to maintain that the attack had been unintentional. Chief of Staff of Japanese naval forces in northern China, Vice Admiral Rokuzo Sugiyama, was assigned to make an apology. The formal apology reached Washington, D.C., on Christmas Eve.

Although Japanese officials maintained that their pilots never saw any American flags on Panay, a US Navy court of inquiry determined that several US flags were clearly visible on the vessel during the attacks. At the meeting held at the American embassy in Tokyo on 23 December, Japanese officials maintained that one navy airplane had attacked a boat by machine gun for a short period of time and that Japanese army motor boats or launches had been attacking the Chinese steamers escaping upstream on the opposite bank. However, the Japanese navy insisted that the attack had been unintentional. The Japanese government paid an indemnity of $2,214,007.36 (approximately $50,640,000 in 2025) to the US on 22 April 1938, officially settling the Panay incident.

Universal Newsreel about the incident, 12 December 1937

== Post-incident ==
=== Donations ===
Following the incident, Japanese individuals and organizations sent letters of apology and gifts of money to U.S. diplomatic offices and the U.S. Navy Department in Washington, D.C. This ranged from letters penned by schoolchildren to organized pools of donors. The most prominent donor was the America–Japan Society, headed by Prince Tokugawa Iesato, which amassed ¥16,242.56 in Panay contributions from 7,749 people and 218 organizations.

In response to the donations, Secretary of State Cordell Hull stated that "neither the American Government nor any agency of it nor any of its nationals should receive sums of money thus offered or take direct benefit therefrom". However, Hull noted that since "a flat rejection of such offers would produce some misunderstanding of our general attitude and offend those Japanese who make such a gesture, the Department is of the opinion that some method should be found whereby Japanese who wish to give that type of expression to their feelings may do so."

The United States State Department expressed the desire that any necessary arrangements should be made promptly. Hull did not wish to keep the Japanese people waiting for a decision on what was to become of the money they donated. A prolonged delay could lead to misunderstanding, especially if a decision were reached months later to return the money to the donors.

A temporary solution was reached to allow only the American ambassador in Japan and the American ambassador in China to accept donations related to the Panay incident. Several American consulates were receiving money, including consulates at Nagoya, Kobe, Nagasaki and Osaka, in Japan; Taipei, Taiwan; Keijo (Seoul), Korea; Dairen, Manchuria; and São Paulo, Brazil. These contributions were eventually forwarded to the ambassador in Tokyo. Grew kept all money received related to the Panay incident in the embassy safe until the State Department could find a solution.

Despite this policy, a local newspaper in Nagasaki, the Nagasaki Minyu Shimbun, published stories about some Japanese donations to the American consulate in Nagasaki, including an excerpt from a letter attached to a schoolboy's donation. Arthur F. Tower, the American consul in Nagasaki, informed Ambassador Grew of the article, which had been published on 7 January. Tower also informed Grew that a reporter of another newspaper—the Tokyo and Osaka Asahi Shimbun, had called on him on 23 December to discuss the Panay contributions. Towers reassured Grew that "this consulate has not sought to give publicity to the donations received or offered and has furnished information concerning them on two occasions only, when requested." However, the newspaper stories may nonetheless have increased contributions to the location.

A final solution to the donations was reached by creating the Japan-America Trust in the name of the Panay survivors and relatives of those who lost their lives. The trust would be used to care for the graves of American sailors buried in Japan, dating back to the graves of sailors involved in the Perry Expedition in 1853. The formation of the trust allowed the State Department to avoid returning donations or directly distributing them to the U.S. government or individuals. (See also Foreign cemeteries in Japan.)

=== Awards ===
Service members aboard Panay were awarded the Navy Expeditionary Medal and China Service Medal.

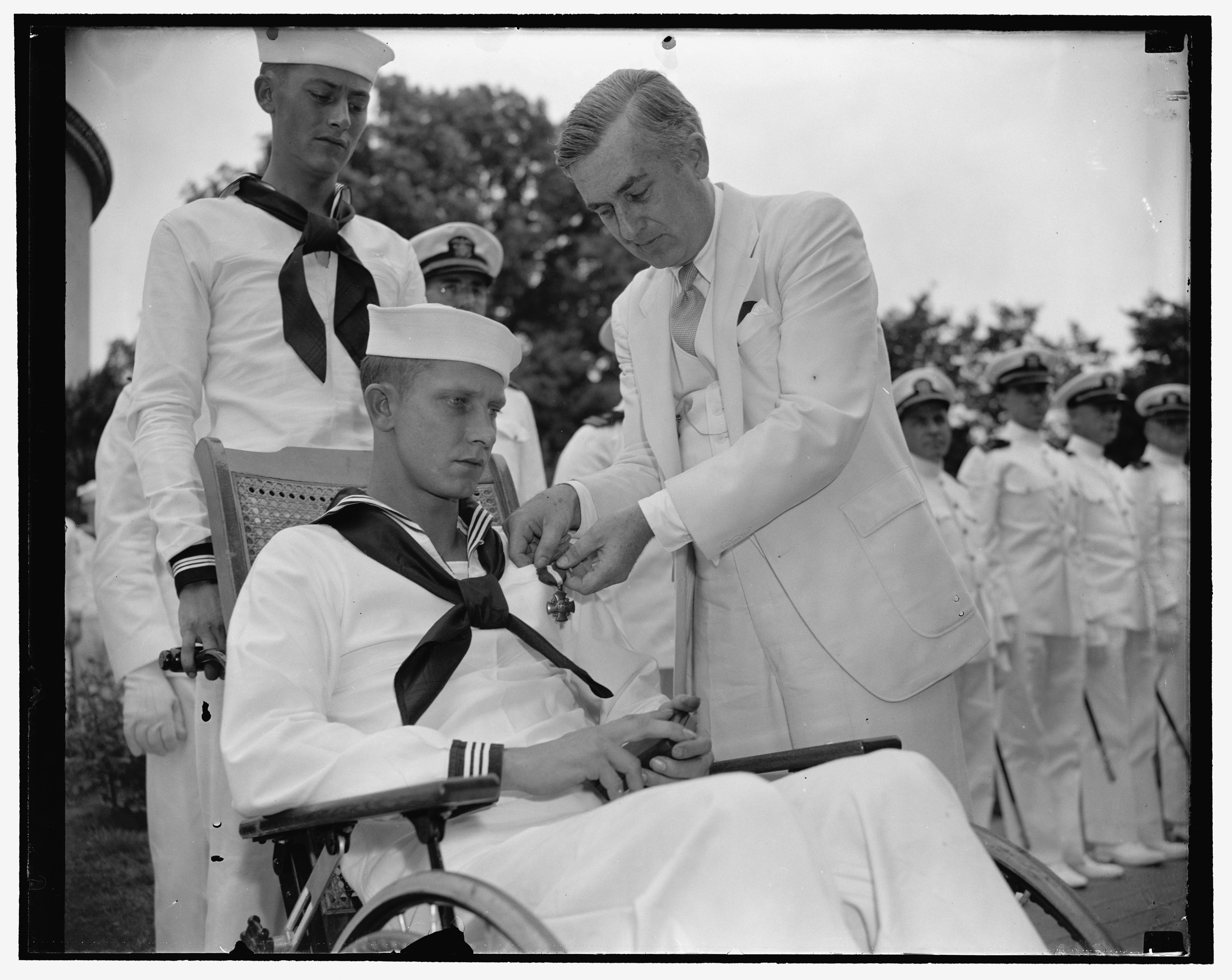
Fireman First Class John L. Hodge is decorated with the Navy Cross for bravery displayed during the sinking of USS Panay

Fireman First Class John L. Hodge and Lieutenant Clark G. Grazier were presented with the Navy Cross for their actions during the Panay incident.

The Navy Cross was also presented to two British naval officers, Vice Admiral Lewis Eyre Crabbe and Lieut. Commander Harry Barlow, for their assistance in recovering survivors from USS Panay.

== Responsibility for the attack ==
Modern historians believe that the attack may have been intentional.

Newsreel footage captured by the cameramen aboard Panay showed Japanese aircraft passing so close to the ship that the pilots' faces were visible, which provided "potent evidence" that the Japanese claim of mistaken identity was not true, according to American historian Richard B. Frank. Per Roosevelt's request, Universal Pictures edited the sequence out of its newsreels to quell a political crisis.

According to John Prados, Navy cryptographers had intercepted and decrypted traffic relating to the attacking planes, which clearly indicated that they were under orders during the attack and that it had not been a mistake of any kind. This information was not released at the time because it would have revealed that the United States had broken Japanese naval codes.

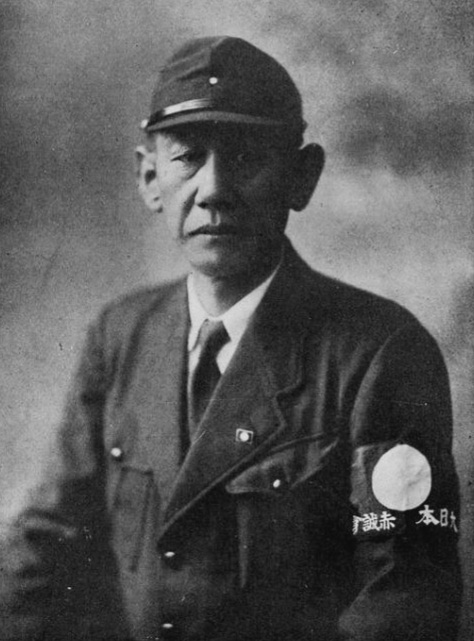
Japanese colonel Kingoro Hashimoto in 1937, who deliberately ordered artillery attacks on the sinking Panay and British ships near Nanjing

Writer Nick Sparks believes that the chaos in Nanjing created an opportunity for renegade factions within the Japanese army who wanted to force the U.S. into an active conflict so that the Japanese could once and for all drive the U.S. out of China.

Panay was not the only Western vessel attacked on the Yangtze during the Battle of Nanking. The Japanese pilots responsible for the Panay attack would bomb the British ship SS Wantung on the same afternoon. Colonel Kingoro Hashimoto, who had founded the Japanese right-wing secret society Sakurakai, and was a member of the Black Dragon Society, targeted Panay as it sank. He also deliberately shelled the British vessels SS Scarab and HMS Cricket beforehand. When informed that the ships had clearly flown the British flag, Hashimoto responded "I do not recognize any flag but my own." Hashimoto had also issued orders to his troops to fire on all ships on the Yangtze "regardless of nationality."

== Legacy ==
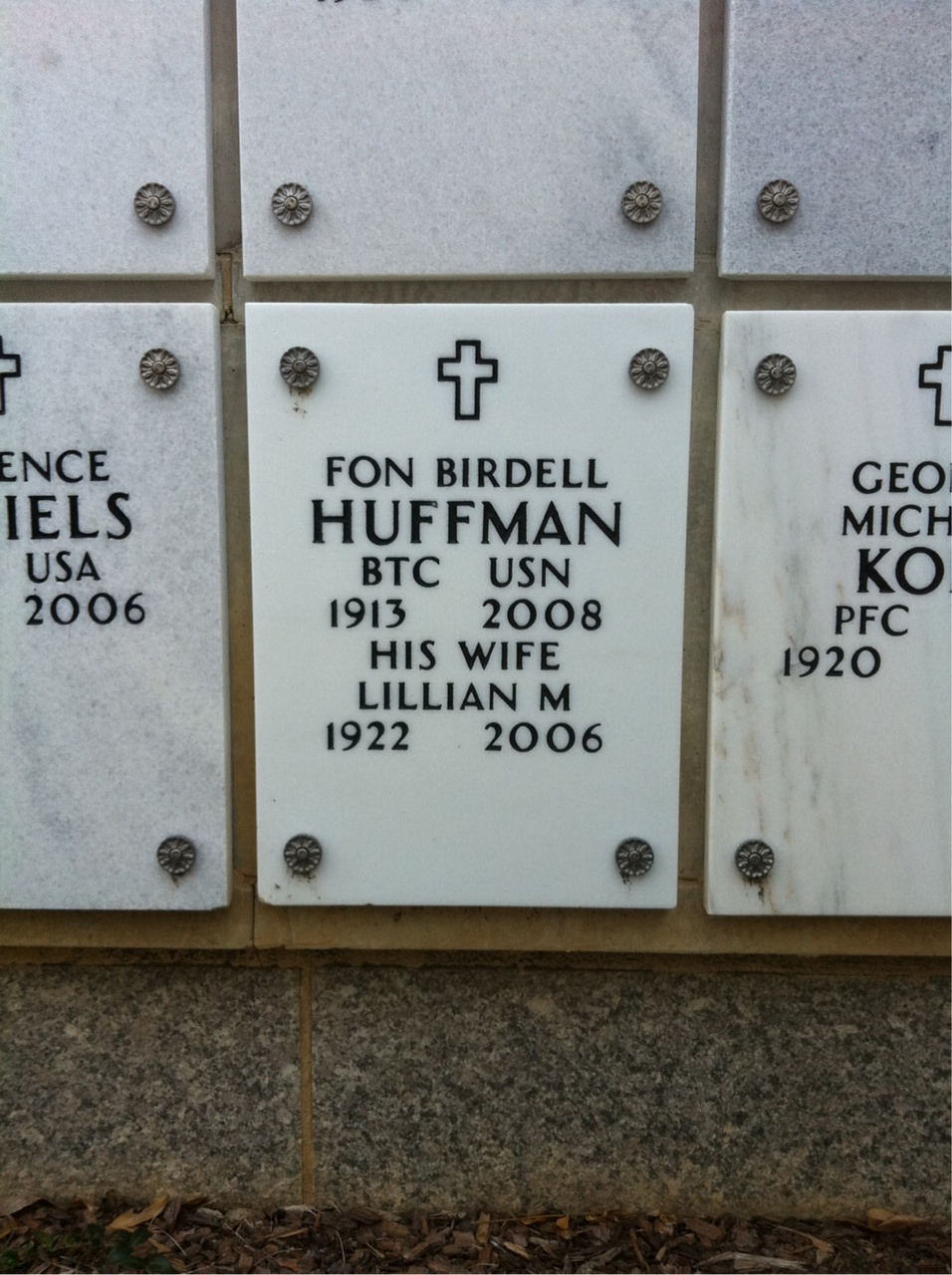
Grave at Arlington National Cemetery of Fon Huffman

Fon Huffman, the last survivor of the incident, died in 2008. The last surviving Japanese pilot who participated in the attack was Kaname Harada, who died in 2016.

The episode has been cited by Philip K. Dick in his novel The Man in the High Castle, depicted in a collectible picture-card of the 1940s, in the series Horrors of War with the title "The sinking of the Panay."

The incident features in the 2005 novel A Winter in China by the British writer Douglas Galbraith. It is also described in the historical fiction novel Pearl Harbor by Newt Gingrich and William R. Forstchen.

The 2009 film John Rabe portrays a fictionalized version of the incident.

== See also ==
- Japan–United States relations
- Amethyst incident
