= Insect-class gunboat =

Class of Royal Navy littoral ships

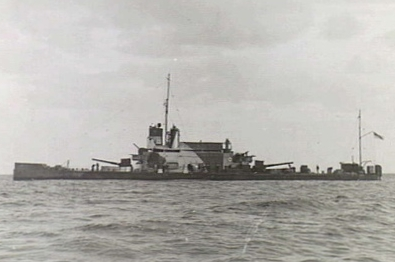
- HMS Ladybird off Bardia in December 1940, showing her World War II configuration with the longer 50-calibre 6-inch guns installed in 1939

Class overview
- Name: Insect class
- Operators: Royal Navy
- Completed: 12
- Lost: 3
- Retired: 9

General characteristics
- Type: Gunboat
- Displacement: 625 long tons (635 t)
- Length: 237 ft 6 in (72.39 m)
- Beam: 36 ft (11 m)
- Draught: 4 ft (1.2 m)
- Propulsion: 2 shaft VTE engines, 2 Yarrow type mixed firing boilers 2000 IHP
- Speed: 14 kn (16 mph; 26 km/h)
- Complement: 55
- Armament: As built: 2 × BL 6-inch Mk VII guns; 2 × 12-pounder guns; 6 × .303" Maxim machine guns; Variations: 1 × QF 2-pounder "Pom-Pom"; 1 × QF 3-inch anti-aircraft gun; .303" Lewis machine gun; Oerlikon 20 mm cannon
- Armour: Improvised

The Insect-class gunboats (or large China gunboats) were a class of small but well-armed Royal Navy ships designed for use in shallow rivers or inshore. (Note: The Fly-class gunboats were "small China gunboats".) They were intended for use on the Danube against Austria-Hungary (the China name was to disguise their function; however, they did see service on the Yangtze river in China). The first four ships—Gnat, Mantis, Moth and Tarantula—were first employed during the Mesopotamian Campaign of the First World War on the Euphrates and Tigris rivers.

== Design ==
HMS Ladybird

The ships were designed by Yarrow to operate in shallow, fast-flowing rivers, with a shallow draught and a good turn of speed to counter river flow. They were fitted with two vertical triple expansion engines operating two propeller shafts to offer some redundancy. The propellers were housed in tunnels to minimise the operating draught. The main armament consisted of two 6-inch guns in single mountings fore and aft.

== Deployment ==
Aphis, Bee, Ladybird and Scarab were deployed to Port Said, Egypt, in 1915–16, Gnat, Mantis, Moth and Tarantula were sent to the Persian Gulf in 1916. Glowworm, Cicala, Cockchafer and Cricket were deployed to the east coast of England in 1916 and had their main armament mountings modified to give higher elevation for anti-Zeppelin work.

In 1919, during the Russian Civil War, Glowworm, Cicala, Cockchafer, Cricket, Moth and Mantis served on the Dvina River (northern Russia, in Arkhangelsk Oblast), fighting in support of White Russian forces. Glowworm's captain and some other crew members were killed when a nearby ammunition barge exploded. The crew of Cicala mutinied as part of a wider wave of unrest in the Royal Navy and five "ringleaders" were sentenced to death, later commuted to five years' imprisonment.

Between the two world wars, the class were mainly used in the Far East and they were present during the Japanese invasion of China. In 1937, on the Yangtze river, the Japanese attacked Ladybird, firing on her from a shore battery. US gunboat USS Panay was also attacked by Japanese aircraft and sunk. Ladybird sailed the 20 mi (32 km) to the scene of the sinking, rescued some of the Panay survivors and took them to Shanghai. Scarab and Cricket were off Nanking in 1937 as the Japanese started to bomb the city.

In 1939, the original two 6 inch Mk VII 45-calibre guns on Aphis and Ladybird were replaced by more modern and 30 in (76 cm) longer 6-inch Mk XIII 50-calibre guns from the decommissioned battleship Agincourt.

At the start of the Second World War, three vessels, Cricket, Gnat and Ladybird, were transferred to the Inshore Squadron of the Mediterranean Fleet. They joined the monitor Terror and provided bombardment support for the Eighth Army. Their shallow draught allowed them to act also as supply and landing vessels, able to get close to beaches. In June 1943, Aphis took part in the bombardment of Pantelleria (Operation Corkscrew).

== Ships in class ==
- Aphis: built by Ailsa shipbuilding, scrapped Singapore, 1947.
- Bee: built by Ailsa shipbuilding, flagship of Rear Admiral, Yangtze (RAY), sold in March 1939.
- Cicala: built by Barclay Curle, sunk by Japanese bombs on 21 December 1941.
- Cockchafer: built by Barclay Curle, sold for scrap in 1949, the last surviving member of the class.
- Cricket: built by Barclay Curle, heavily damaged by bombs on 29 June 1941; used as target by Royal Navy and sunk off Cyprus 1944.
- Glowworm: built by Barclay Curle, scrapped September 1928.
- Gnat: built by Lobnitz, damaged by U-boat 21 October 1941, declared total loss, and then used as anti-aircraft platform. Scrapped 1946.
- Ladybird: built by Lobnitz, sunk on 12 May 1941 off Tobruk during World War II, then used as an anti-aircraft position
- Mantis: built by Sunderland Shipbuilding Company Ltd, sold in January 1940 and subsequently scrapped.
- Moth: built by Sunderland Shipbuilding Company Ltd, scuttled in Hong Kong 1941, captured and repaired by the Japanese and renamed Suma, sunk by mines in Yangtze River on 19 March 1945.
- Scarab: built by Wood, Skinner & Co, scrapped in 1948.
- Tarantula built by Wood, Skinner & Co, briefly flagship of the British Pacific Fleet, expended as a target 1946.
