= HMS Cicala =

Royal Navy Insect-class gunboat

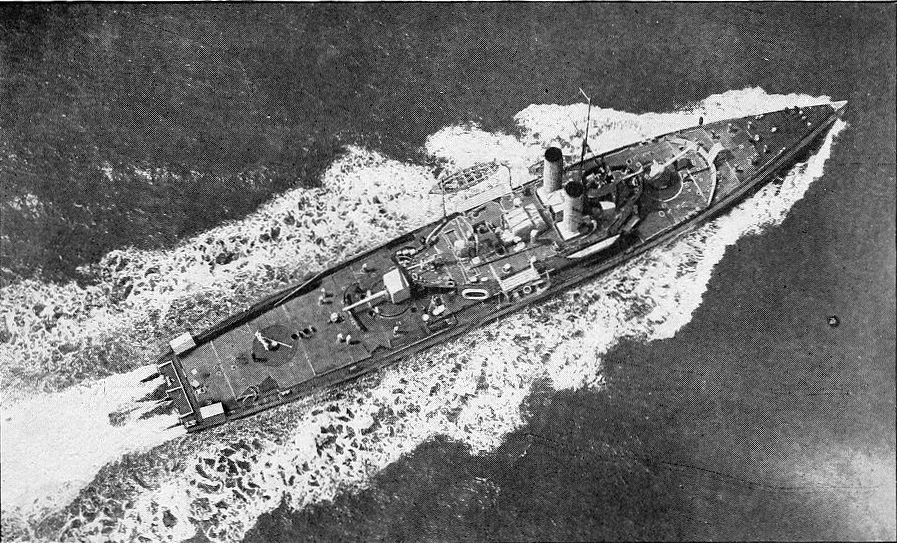
- An aerial photograph of an Insect-class vessel taken in August 1918

History

United Kingdom
- Name: HMS Cicala
- Namesake: Cicada (archaic spelling)
- Builder: Barclay Curle
- Launched: 1915
- Fate: Scuttled 21 December 1941 in the West Lamma Channel during the Battle of Hong Kong

General characteristics
- Class & type: Insect-class gunboat
- Displacement: 625 long tons (635 t)
- Length: 237 ft 6 in (72.39 m)
- Beam: 36 ft (11 m)
- Draught: 4 ft (1.2 m)
- Propulsion: 2 Yarrow-type engines and boilers, 2,000 ihp (1,500 kW)
- Speed: 14 knots (26 km/h; 16 mph)
- Complement: 55
- Armament: As built: 2 x BL 6-inch Mk VII guns; 1 x QF 12-pounder 12 cwt anti-aircraft gun; 6 x Maxim machine guns; AA gun later replaced with a QF 2-pounder (40mm) "pom-pom" gun
- Armour: Built with 1/2 in (13 mm) armour to gun positions and superstructure; Additional 1 in (2.5 cm) steel plate added to gun positions and bridge in 1928

HMS Cicala was an Insect-class gunboat of the Royal Navy. She was built in 1915 for shallow water work, possibly on the Danube or in the Baltic Sea during the First World War. Cicala was deployed to the Baltic for the 1918–19 British campaign against the Russian Bolsheviks. Whilst there her crew mutinied and refused to follow orders to attack a Russian shore battery. The mutiny was quelled when Admiral John Green threatened to open fire on Cicala; five men were sentenced to imprisonment by court-martial over the matter. The gunboat afterwards served on the China station, acting against pirates. She was at Hong Kong when the Japanese invaded in 1941 and provided fire support for the unsuccessful British defence. On 21 December 1941, she was struck by Japanese bombs and was afterwards scuttled.

== Construction ==
The Insect-class gunboats were reportedly built as river monitors to operate on the Danube in the case of an Allied success in the 1915–16 Dardanelles campaign but may also have been intended for use in the Baltic Sea to support a proposed (but never implemented) amphibious landing against Germany. The class was ordered in February 1915 and Cicala was constructed later that year by Barclay Curle. The entire class were named after insects, with Cicala being an alternative name of the cicada (the cicada is primarily tropical, only one species, Cicadetta montana, being native to Britain).

Cicala measured 237 feet 6 inches (72.39 m) in length, 36 feet (11 m) in beam and just 4 feet (1.2 m) in draught; her displacement was 625 long tons (635 t). The vessel was equipped with two Yarrow-type engines and boilers providing 2,000 indicated horsepower (1,500 kW) and allowing her to reach 14 knots (26 km/h; 16 mph). With her flat bottom and three rudders she was described as being very manoeuvrable (she could turn "almost on a sixpence").

The Cicala was equipped with two 6-inch Mk VII breech-loading guns, a 12-pounder quick-firing 12 cwt anti-aircraft gun and six Maxim machine guns. The anti-aircraft weapon was later replaced with a quick-firing 2-pounder (pom-pom) gun. The main weapons had 4/8-inch (1.3 cm)-thick gunshields with armour plating of the same thickness also provided to the superstructure as protection against small arms fire. The gunshields and bridge were reinforced with additional 1 inch (2.5 cm) steel plate in 1928. Cicala carried a complement of 55 officers and men. Her pendant number was T71.

== Service ==
Cicala was deployed against the Russian Bolsheviks during the British campaign in the Baltic (1918–1919). In June 1919 her crew mutinied, refusing orders to sail up the River Dvina to engage Bolshevik artillery batteries. Other British vessels had run aground in shallow waters and come under attack from the batteries, gun barges, floating mines and aircraft. Rear Admiral John Green ordered the other ships in his squadron to turn their guns on the Cicala and threatened to open fire, after which the mutineers backed down and obeyed the orders. Green's senior officer, Rear Admiral Walter Cowan, was uncertain if the crew could be tried for mutiny as it was a wartime-only offence and Britain had not formally declared war against the Bolsheviks. The Admiralty in London confirmed that charges could be brought and Cowan's court-martial sentenced five ringleaders to death, afterwards commuted to five years imprisonment.

Cicala was later assigned to the China station. In November 1923 she assisted a Japanese merchant steamer that had grounded while escaping pirates near Guangzhou. On 4 June 1935, the vessel surprised five pirate sampans which had just attacked a junk carrying firewood and ammunition on the West (Xi) River and drove the pirates away. In 1937, she responded to a report of a pirate attack on a steamer; the crew of the steamer had repulsed an attack but suspected some pirates got aboard. Cicala put aboard a naval guard party and escorted the vessel to Shiuhing (Zhaoqing) where at least ten suspects were arrested.

=== Battle of Hong Kong ===
Cicala was at Hong Kong when it was invaded by Japanese forces on 8 December 1941, beginning the Battle of Hong Kong. Her commander was Lieutenant Commander John Boldero, a veteran of the Battle of Jutland; Boldero was commander of the motor torpedo boat flotilla in the harbour until April 1941 when he lost an arm in a collision with another vessel. He discharged himself from hospital and was in command of Cicala by the time of the battle.

Cicala spent the first two weeks of the battle travelling around the harbour to provide fire support against Japanese attacks. Boldero steered her with his left arm and she survived at least 60 Japanese dive bomber attacks.

By 21 December, it had become clear that the British were losing the battle and many British vessels were ordered to be scuttled. Cicala and the motor torpedo boats were permitted to try to escape to Singapore and Boldero loaded her with fuel for the attempt. At 10:00 that morning he sailed to Deep Water Bay to provide fire support to Pillbox 14, which was under attack by Japanese infantry. The ship came under heavy mortar fire and was attacked by six Japanese dive bomber aircraft. The gunboat was hit by bombs; her boats were holed, steam pipes broken, and hull shattered. Almost all of her crew survived and were taken off by the motor torpedo boat MTB 10. Cicala was scuttled in West Lamma Channel by depth charges launched from MTB 09.

Cicala's name was reused later in the Second World War for the stone frigate established at the Royal Dart Hotel at Kingswear, Devon. This station commanded all coastal forces in and around Dartmouth.

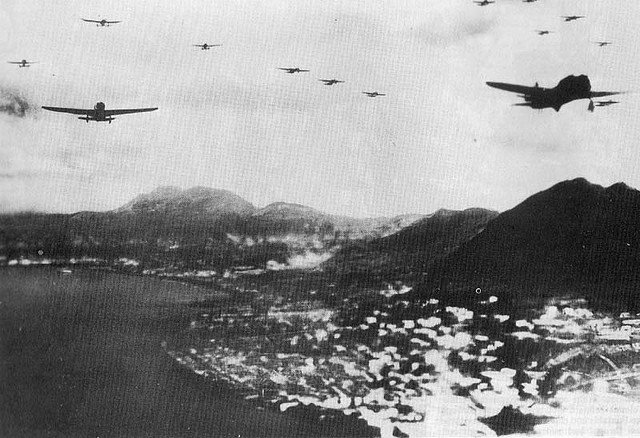
Japanese aircraft over Hong Kong, 1941

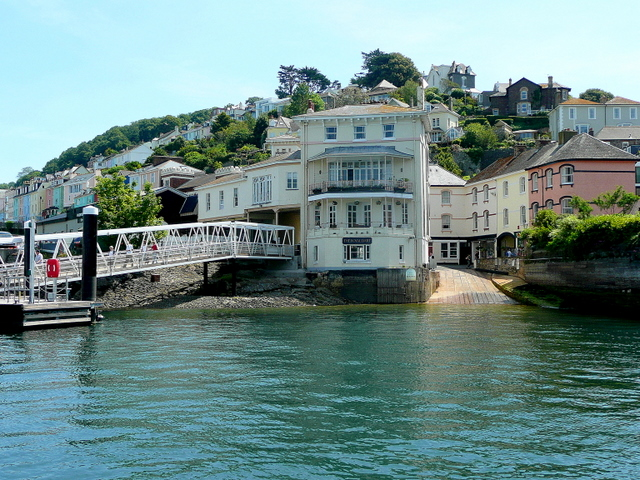
The Royal Dart Hotel
