= HMS Ladybird (1916) =

Insect-class gunboat of the Royal Navy

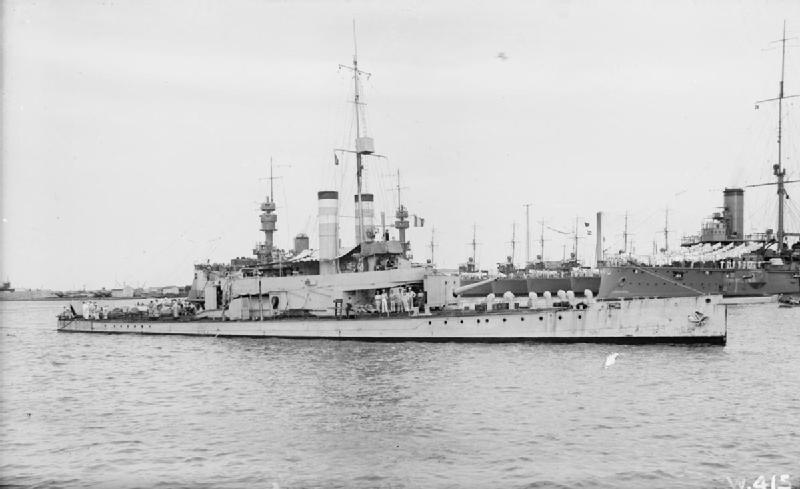
- HMS Ladybird at Port Said in November 1917

History

United Kingdom
- Name: HMS Ladybird
- Launched: 1916
- Fate: Sunk in shallow water 12 May 1941, used as anti-aircraft position. 32°4′33″N 23°58′21″E

General characteristics
- Class & type: Insect-class gunboat
- Displacement: 625 long tons (635 t)
- Length: 237 ft 6 in (72.39 m)
- Beam: 36 ft (11 m)
- Draught: 4 ft (1.2 m)
- Propulsion: 2 shaft VTE engines, 2 Yarrow type mixed firing boilers 2000 IHP
- Speed: 14 knots (16 mph; 26 km/h)
- Complement: 55
- Armament: As built: 2 × BL 6-inch Mk VII guns; 2 × 12-pounder guns; 6 × .303" Maxim machine guns; Variations: 1 × QF 2-pounder "Pom-Pom"; 1 × QF 3-inch anti-aircraft gun; .303" Lewis machine guns; Oerlikon 20 mm cannon
- Armour: Improvised

HMS Ladybird was an Insect-class gunboat of the Royal Navy, launched in 1916. This class is also referred to as "large China gunboats". Originally built to patrol the River Danube during the First World War, she sailed for China from Malta in February 1927 to serve on the Yangtze River.

== History ==
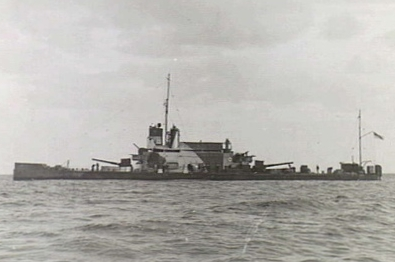
Off Bardia on 31 December 1940

On 12 December 1937, Ladybird, along with Bee became involved in the Panay incident and came under fire from a Japanese artillery unit near Wuhu on the Yangtze River. Ladybird was hit by six shells and Bee dodged one as she came upon the scene. Ladybird was not badly damaged and with Bee picked up survivors from the sunk USS Panay.

In 1939 the original pair of 6-inch (152 mm) Mk VII 45-calibre guns was replaced by more modern and 30 inches (760 mm) longer 6-inch Mk XIII 50-calibre guns from the decommissioned battleship HMS Agincourt.

Ladybird was allocated to Singapore in 1940 and then, along with five others of the class, stripped down and towed to the Mediterranean Sea. During the journey she sustained damage which meant she was limited to a speed of 7 knots (13 km/h; 8.1 mph) due to a misaligned hull. She was initially used to guard Port Said.

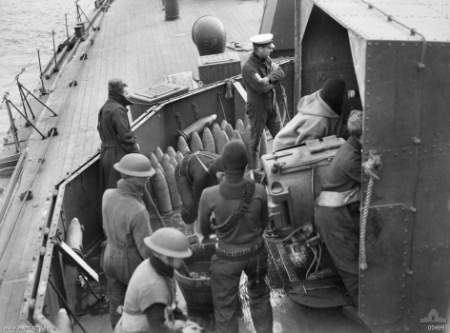
Ladybird's gunners in action during the bombardment of Bardia, 31 December 1940

In late December 1940 and early January 1941 Ladybird was engaged at close range, bombarding the Italian port of Bardia in Libya, in support of the Allied Capture of Bardia on 5 January 1941 as part of Operation Compass.

On 25 February 1941 she landed a Royal Marine unit during Operation Abstention, an ill-fated attempt to seize the Italian island of Kastelorizo, where she was hit by an aerial bomb. Later, acting in support of the Tobruk garrison, she shelled the Gazala airfield and ferried in supplies. During this duty, on 12 May 1941, she was severely damaged by dive bombers and set on fire, settling on an even keel in 10 feet (3.0 m) of water. Still above water, her 3-inch (76 mm) gun was used as an anti-aircraft gun; HMS Gnat replaced Ladybird in supporting Tobruk.
