= HMS Bee (1915) =

Gunboat of the Royal Navy

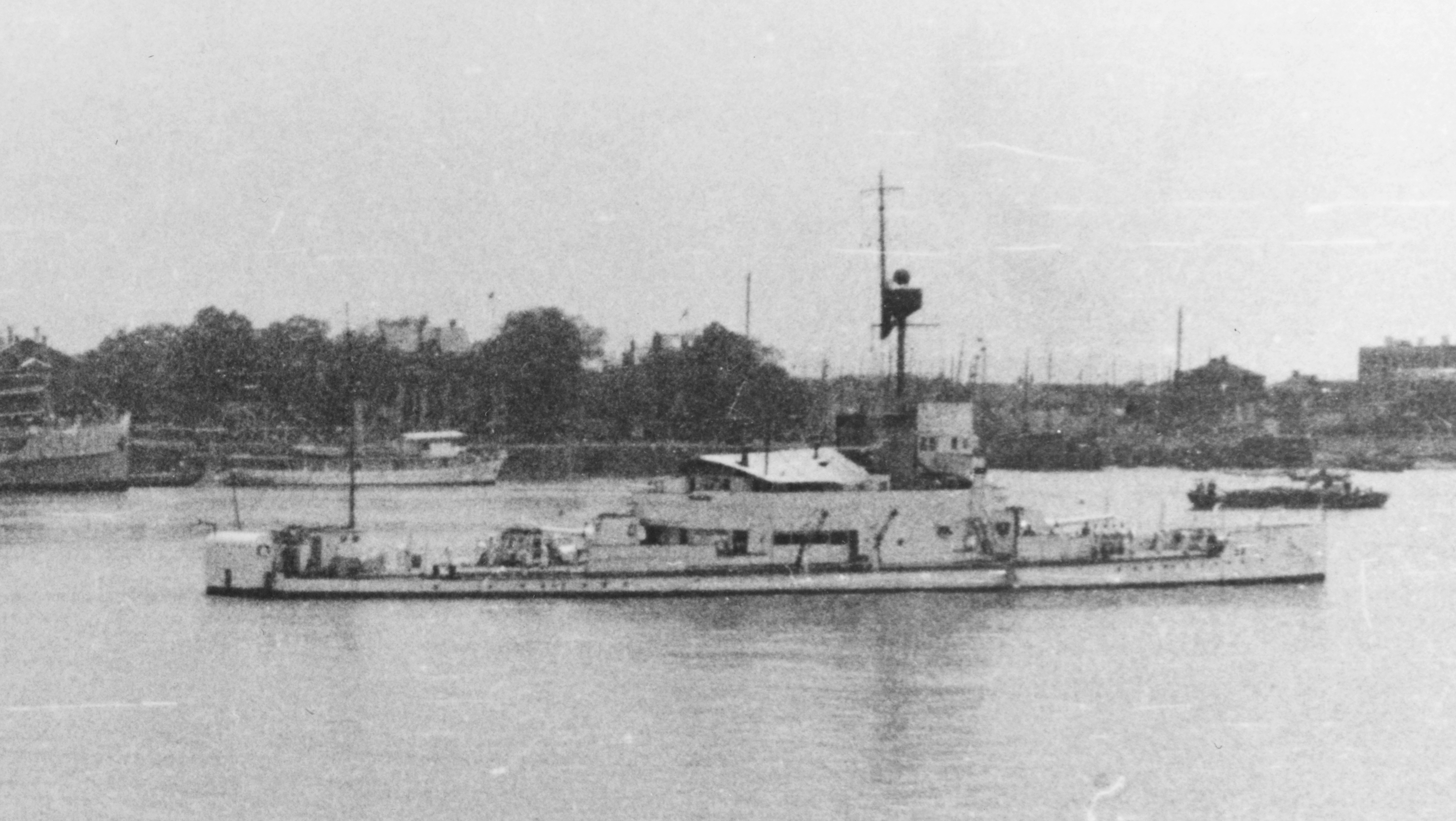
- HMS Bee at Hankou in 1937

History

United Kingdom
- Name: HMS Bee
- Launched: 8 December 1915
- Fate: Sold for scrap, 22 March 1939

General characteristics
- Class & type: Insect-class gunboat
- Displacement: 625 long tons (635 t)
- Length: 237 ft 6 in (72.39 m)
- Beam: 36 ft (11 m)
- Draught: 4 ft (1.2 m)
- Propulsion: 2 shaft VTE engines, 2 Yarrow type mixed firing boilers 2000 IHP
- Speed: 14 knots (16 mph; 26 km/h)
- Complement: 55
- Armament: As built: 2 × BL 6-inch Mk VII guns; 2 × 12-pounder guns; 6 × .303" Maxim machine guns; Variations: 1 × QF 2-pounder "Pom-Pom"; 1 × QF 3-inch anti-aircraft gun; .303" Lewis machine gun; Oerlikon 20 mm cannon
- Armour: Improvised

HMS Bee was an Insect-class gunboat of the Royal Navy, launched on 8 December 1915. This class are also known as "large China gunboats".

Initially built to patrol the River Danube during the First World War, after the war the Insects were transported to China and served on the Yangtze River. In 1920, Bee became the flagship of the Yangtze patrol.

On 12 December 1937, Bee, along with Ladybird, became involved in the Panay incident and came under fire from a Japanese artillery unit near Wuhu on the Yangtze. Ladybird took six shells and Bee dodged a shell as she came upon the scene.

Bee was paid off in 1938 when the gunboat Scorpion, the new flagship, arrived. She was sold in Shanghai for scrap on 22 March 1939 for £5,225.
