= HMS Cricket (1915) =

Royal Navy Insect-class gunboat

- A 1915 postcard drawing of HMS Cricket and a Zeppelin airship

History

United Kingdom
- Name: HMS Cricket
- Builder: Barclay Curle
- Launched: 17 December 1915
- Fate: Crippled in an air attack, 12 July 1941. Declared constructive loss, 30 June 1942. Used for spare parts and hull sunk as target by RAF.

General characteristics
- Class & type: Insect-class gunboat
- Displacement: 625 long tons (635 t)
- Length: 237 ft 6 in (72.39 m)
- Beam: 36 ft (11 m)
- Draught: 4 ft (1.2 m)
- Propulsion: 2 shaft VTE engines, 2 Yarrow type mixed firing boilers 2000 IHP
- Speed: 14 knots (16 mph; 26 km/h)
- Complement: 55
- Armament: As built: 2 × BL 6-inch Mk VII guns; 2 × 12-pounder guns; 6 × .303" Maxim machine guns; Variations: 1 × QF 2-pounder "Pom-Pom"; 1 × QF 3-inch anti-aircraft gun; .303" Lewis machine gun; Oerlikon 20 mm cannon
- Armour: Improvised

HMS Cricket was a Royal Navy Insect-class gunboat. She was built by Barclay Curle and launched on 17 December 1915.

During the First World War, Cricket took part in the Mesopotamian Campaign as part of the gunboat squadron operating on the Euphrates and Tigris rivers. During the Russian Civil War, Cricket served as part of the British intervention forces fighting in support of White Russian forces on the Dvina River during 1919–1920.

In 1937 she along with other foreign vessels such as the USS Panay were attacked under the orders of Colonel Kingoro Hashimoto, during the Battle of Nanking.

During the Second World War, Cricket was in China until 1940 then transferred to the Mediterranean Fleet's Inshore Squadron. On 12 July 1941 she was crippled in an air attack by Regia Aeronautica unit 97 Gruppo (Group) and its 239 Squadriglia (Squadron), led by Major Giuseppe Cenni. One of Cenni's crew took a picture of her during the attack.

She was declared a constructive total loss on 30 June 1942 and stripped for spares at Alexandria, Egypt in 1942. Her hull was towed to Cyprus and used as a target for Royal Air Force training off Dhekelia where the sunken hull is an attraction for scuba divers.

== Bibliography ==
- Lenton, H. T. and Colledge, J.J. (1973) Warships of World War II, 2nd ed., Shepperton : Ian Allan, 653 p., ISBN 0-7110-0403-X
- Smith, Peter C. The Junkers Ju 87 Stuka: A Complete History. London: Crécy Publishing, 2011. ISBN 978-0-85979-156-4.
- Zolandez, Thomas (2004). "Question 6/01: Japanese WW II Spy". Warship International. XLI (1): 33–34. ISSN 0043-0374.
