= USS Panay (PR-5) =

US Navy river gunboat sunk in 1937

Coordinates: 31°41′12″N 118°26′12″E

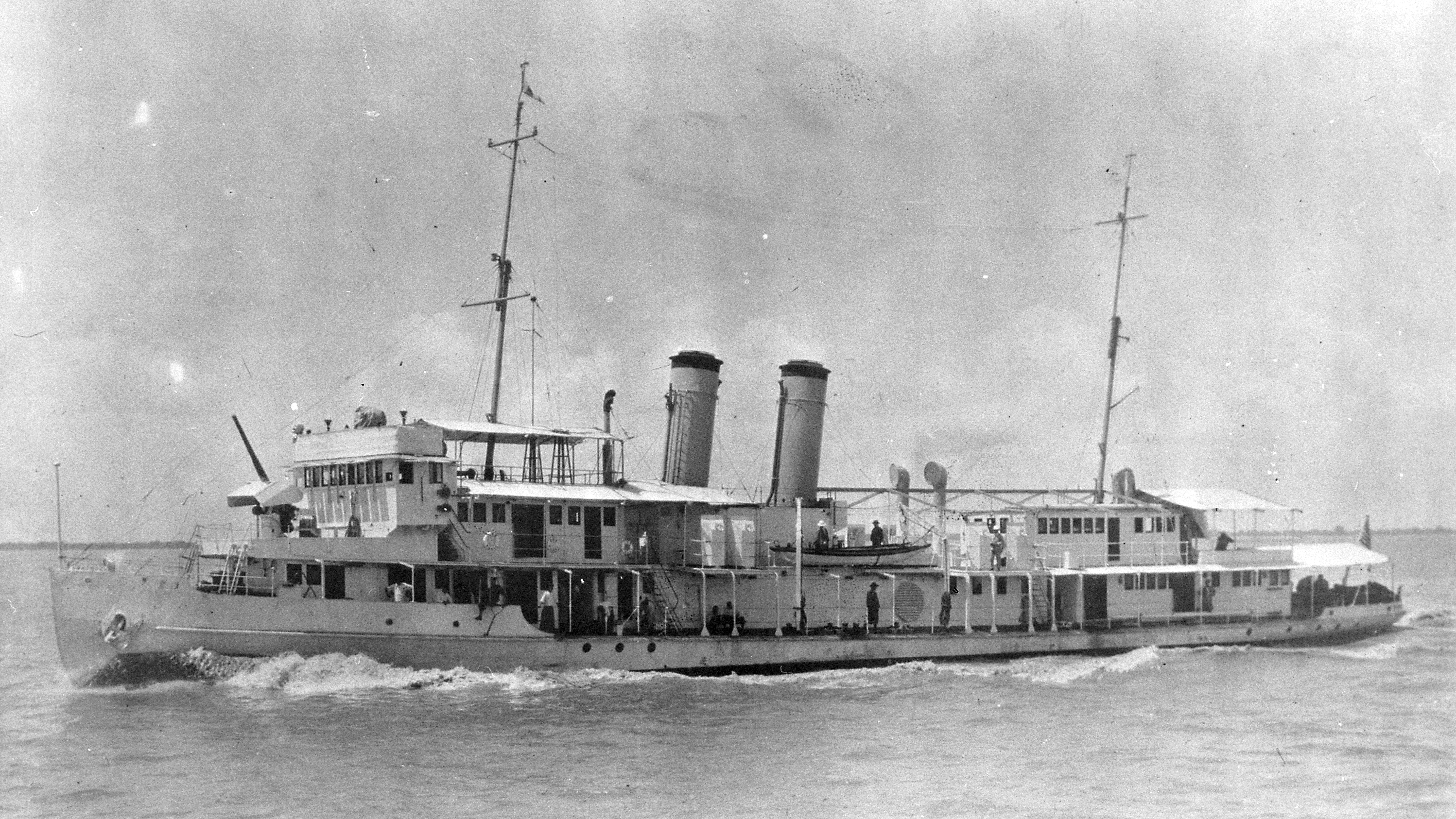
- Panay underway during the standardization trial off Wusong, China, on 30 August 1928

History

United States
- Namesake: Panay
- Builder: Jiangnan Dockyard and Engineering Works, Shanghai
- Launched: 10 November 1927
- Commissioned: 10 September 1928
- Fate: Sunk by Japanese aircraft, 12 December 1937

General characteristics
- Type: River gunboat
- Displacement: 474 long tons (482 t)
- Length: 191 ft (58 m)
- Beam: 29 ft (8.8 m)
- Draft: 5 ft 3 in (1.60 m)
- Propulsion: 2 × vertical triple-expansion steam engines 2 × shafts 3 × rudders
- Speed: 15 kn (28 km/h; 17 mph); 17.73 knots (trials)
- Complement: 59 officers and enlisted
- Armament: 2 × 3"/50 caliber guns; 8 × .30 cal (7.62 mm) Model 1917 Lewis machine guns

The second USS Panay (PR–5) of the United States Navy was a Panay-class river gunboat that served on the Yangtze Patrol in China until being sunk by Japanese aircraft on 12 December 1937 on the Yangtze River.

The vessel was built by Jiangnan Dockyard and Engineering Works, Shanghai, China, and launched on 10 November 1927. She was sponsored by Mrs. Ellis S. Stone and commissioned on 10 September 1928.

== History ==
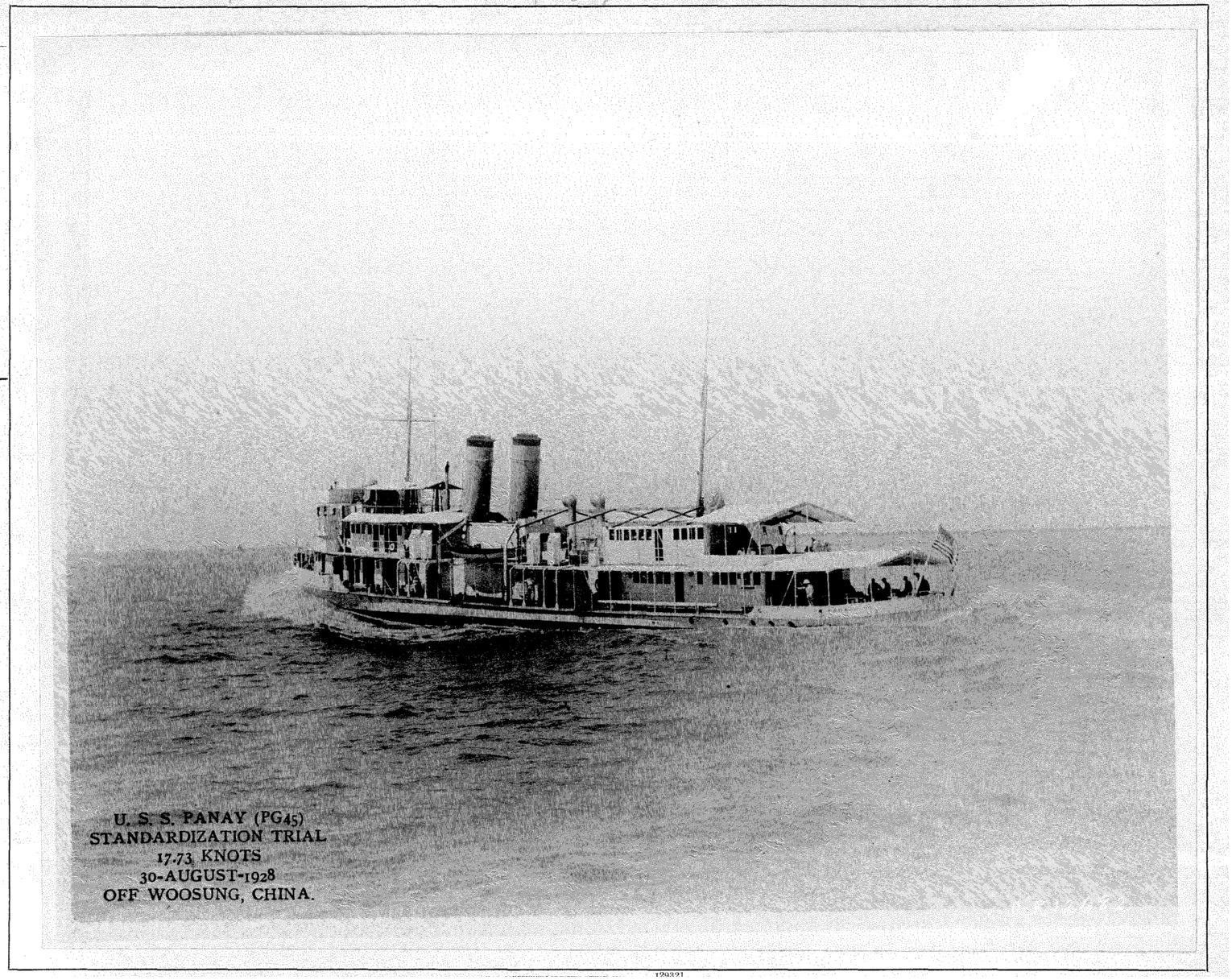
Panay in 1928

Built for duty in the Asiatic Fleet on the Yangtze River, Panay had as her primary mission the protection of American lives and property frequently threatened in the disturbances that the 1920s and 1930s brought to a China struggling to modernize, create a strong central government, and later counter Japanese aggression. Throughout Panay's service, navigation on the Yangtze was constantly menaced by bandits and outlaw soldiers, and Panay and her sister ships provided protection for U.S. shipping and nationals, as other foreign forces did for their citizens.

Often detachments from Panay served as armed guards on American steamers plying the river. In 1931, her commanding officer, Lieutenant Commander R. A. Dyer, reported, "Firing on gunboats and merchant ships have [sic] become so routine that any vessel traversing the Yangtze River sails with the expectation of being fired upon. Fortunately," he added, "the Chinese appear to be rather poor marksmen and the ship has, so far, not sustained any casualties in these engagements."

As the Japanese moved through south China, American gunboats evacuated most of the embassy staff from Nanjing during November 1937. Panay was assigned as station ship to guard the remaining Americans and take them off at the last moment. Panay evacuated the remaining Americans from the city on 11 December, bringing the number of people aboard to five officers, 54 enlisted men, four US embassy staff, and 10 civilians, including Universal News cameraman Norman Alley, Movietone News' Eric Mayell, The New York Times' Norman Soong, Collier's Weekly correspondent Jim Marshall, La Stampa correspondent Sandro Sandri and Corriere della Sera correspondent Luigi Barzini Jr. Panay moved upriver to avoid becoming involved in the fighting around the doomed capital. Three U.S. merchant tankers sailed with her. The Japanese senior naval commander in Shanghai was informed both before and after the fact of this movement.

=== Sunk by the Japanese ===
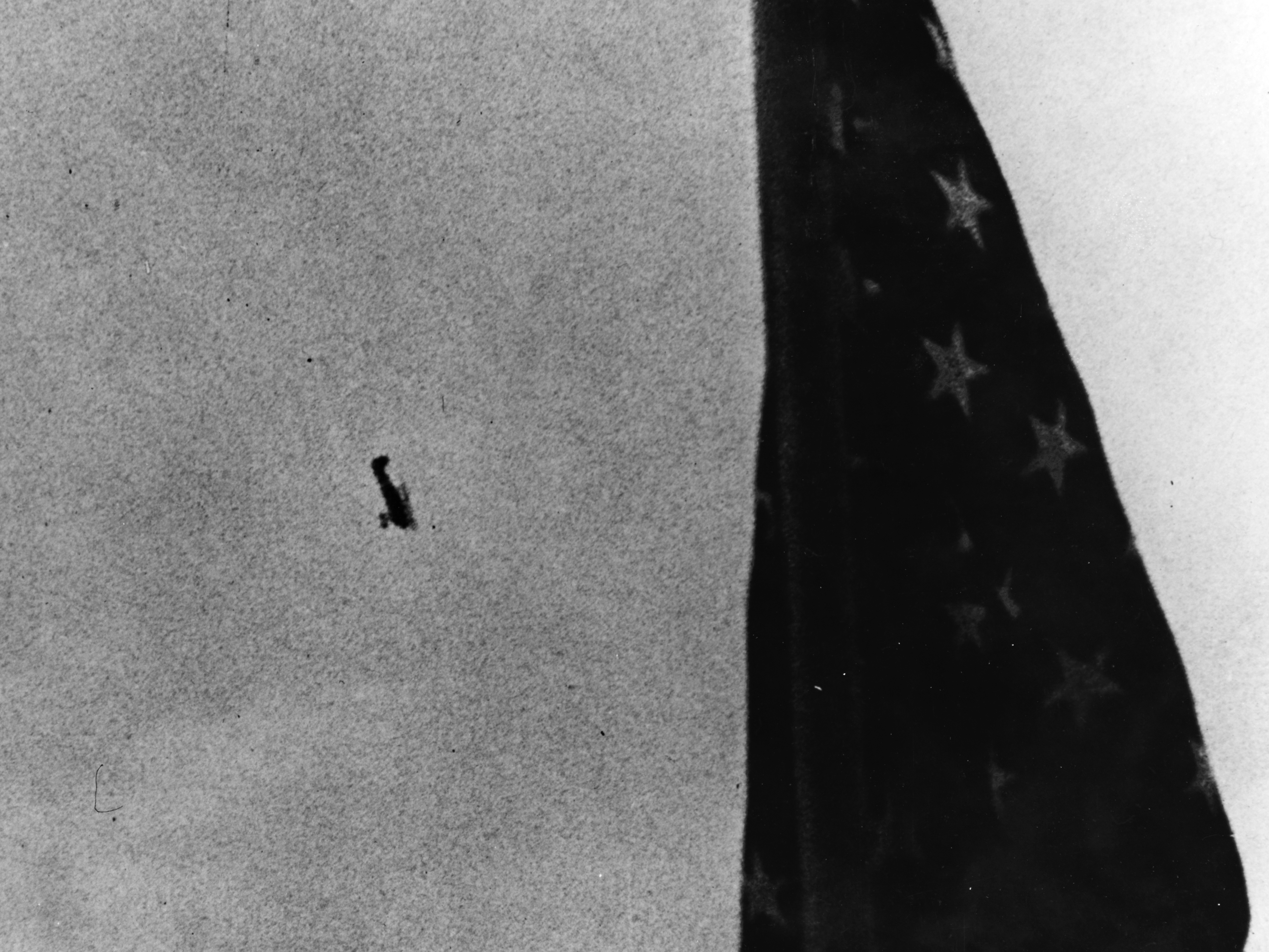
A frame from a newsreel which caught a Japanese plane attacking Panay in China

On 12 December 1937, the Imperial Japanese Army ordered Japanese naval aircraft to attack "any and all ships" in the Yangtze above Nanjing. Knowing of the presence of Panay and the merchantmen, the Imperial Japanese Navy requested verification of the order, which was received before the attack began about 13:27 that day. Although there were several large US flags flown on the ship as well as one painted atop the cabin, the Japanese planes continued strafing and bombing. Panay was hit by two of the eighteen 60 kg (130 lb) bombs dropped by three Yokosuka B4Y Type-96 bombers and strafed by nine Nakajima A4N Type-95 fighters. The bombing continued until Panay sank at 15:54. Storekeeper First Class Charles L. Ensminger, Standard Oil tanker captain Carl H. Carlson and Italian reporter Sandro Sandri were killed, Coxswain Edgar C. Hulsebus died later that night. 43 sailors and five civilians were wounded. Panay's lifeboats were machine-gunned by Japanese fighter planes in the attack.

Two newsreel cameramen, Norman Alley of Universal Newsreel and Eric Mayell of Fox Movietone News, were present on Panay and were able to take considerable film during the attack and afterwards from shore as Panay sank in the middle of the river. The newsreels are now available online at usspanay.org (see "External links" below).

Also on 12 December 1937 two British gunboats, HMS Ladybird (1916) and HMS Bee (1915), came under fire from a Japanese artillery unit near Wuhu on the Yangtze River. Ladybird was hit by six shells, and Bee dodged one as she came upon the scene. Ladybird was not badly damaged, and with Bee, picked up survivors from Panay.

A formal protest was immediately lodged by the U.S. ambassador. The Japanese government accepted responsibility, but insisted the attack was unintentional. A large indemnity was paid (approximately $2,000,000, which is equal to $45,744,681 today) on 22 April 1938 and the incident was officially settled; however, further deterioration of relations between Japan and the United States continued.

Fon Huffman, the last survivor of the incident, died in September 2008.

== Awards ==
- Navy Expeditionary Medal (12 Dec 1937)
- Yangtze Service Medal (1 Mar 1930 – 31 Dec 1932)
- China Service Medal (7 Jul 1937 – 12 Dec 1937)

== See also ==
- List of patrol vessels of the United States Navy
- List of World War II ships of less than 1000 tons
- The Sand Pebbles (film) A film based on a novel about an American gunboat during the 1920s in China
