= Operation Stab =

British naval deception during WWII

- Part of the Pacific War of the Second World War
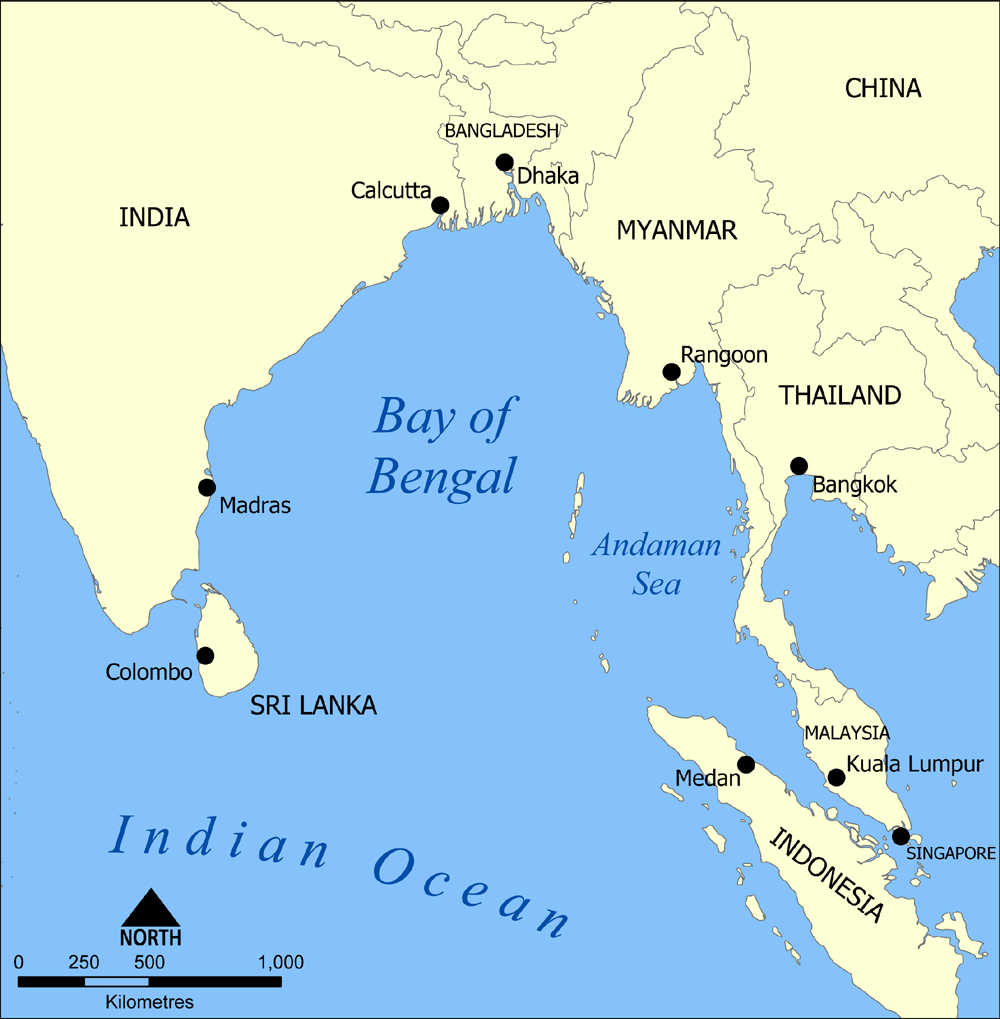
- The Bay of Bengal and the Andaman Sea
Date	21 July – 4 August 1942
Location	Bay of Bengal, Indian Ocean 15°N 88°E
Result	Allied victory

Belligerents
United Kingdom; Australia; Netherlands	(Empire of Japan) Japan

Commanders and leaders
James Somerville	

Units involved
1 battleship; 2 aircraft carriers; 4 light cruisers; 6 destroyers; 1 minelayer; 2 corvettes; 2 sloops; 1 auxiliary vessel; 2 tankers; 10 transport ships	

Casualties and losses
4 aircraft destroyed; 4 killed (flying accidents)	1 aircraft destroyed; 9 killed
- Location within Indian Ocean

Operation Stab was a British naval deception during the Second World War to distract Japanese units for the forthcoming Guadalcanal campaign by the US armed forces.

== Background ==
Admiral Ernest King, the head of the US Navy, asked for a distraction for the forthcoming Guadalcanal Campaign. The Admiralty discussed the request with Vice-Admiral Sir James Somerville, the Commander-in-Chief of the Eastern Fleet, stressing their apprehension at sending aircraft carriers into areas where they could be attacked by land-based aircraft. Operation Pedestal, a convoy operation to Malta, was due in early August, in which two aircraft carriers were to sail into range of Luftwaffe and Regia Aeronautica airfields and wanted to wait to discover their fate.

The Admiralty view limited the scope of a diversion operation to air attacks on Port Blair in the Andaman Islands or Sabang in northern Sumatra. The Dutch naval commander, Vice-Admiral Conrad Helfrich suggested that a raid on Sabang was pointless as the jungle made easy the dispersal and camouflage of aircraft. The main target in an attack on Port Blair would be the Japanese flying boats based there which needed a fighter attack but the relatively short range of these aircraft would mean that their aircraft carriers would be risking attack by land-based aircraft. A deception operation against the Andaman Islands, which had been captured by the Japanese in March 1942, was chosen instead.

=== Plan ===
==== Convoys ====
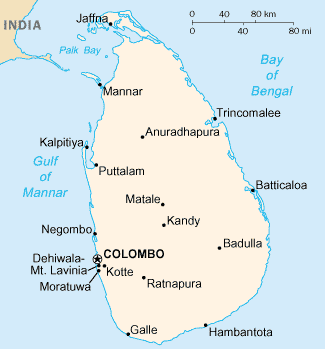
Map of Ceylon

Three dummy convoys, Force V, consisting of Blackheath, Cranfield and Mahout, escorted by HMIS Jumma and HMS Scout would sail from Vizagapatam. Force M, from Madras, consisted of Tasmania, Hoperange, Clan McIver, Yuen Sang and Custodian escorted by the fleet minelayer HMS Manxman, the corvette Aster and the auxiliary patrol vessel Sonovati. Force T, from Trincomalee, consisted of the Royal Fleet Auxiliary tankers RFA Appleleaf and RFA Broomdale with the freighters Shenking and Marit Mærsk escorted by the sloop HMIS Hindustan and the corvette HMS Marguerite. The three convoys were to sail in daylight on 1 August and turn back to their ports during the night.

==== Force A ====
Somerville was to sail to the east of the convoys with Force A, based at Ceylon, consisting of the battleship HMS Warspite, the aircraft carriers HMS Illustrious and Formidable, the light cruisers HMS Birmingham, Effingham, Mauritius and the Netherlander HNLMS Jacob van Heemskerck, with the destroyers HMS Inconstant, HMAS Napier, Nizam, Norman and HNLMS Van Galen. Wireless messages were to be used to make sure that the Japanese discovered the ship movements and then to suggest that the operation has been postponed due to an accident.

== Operation ==
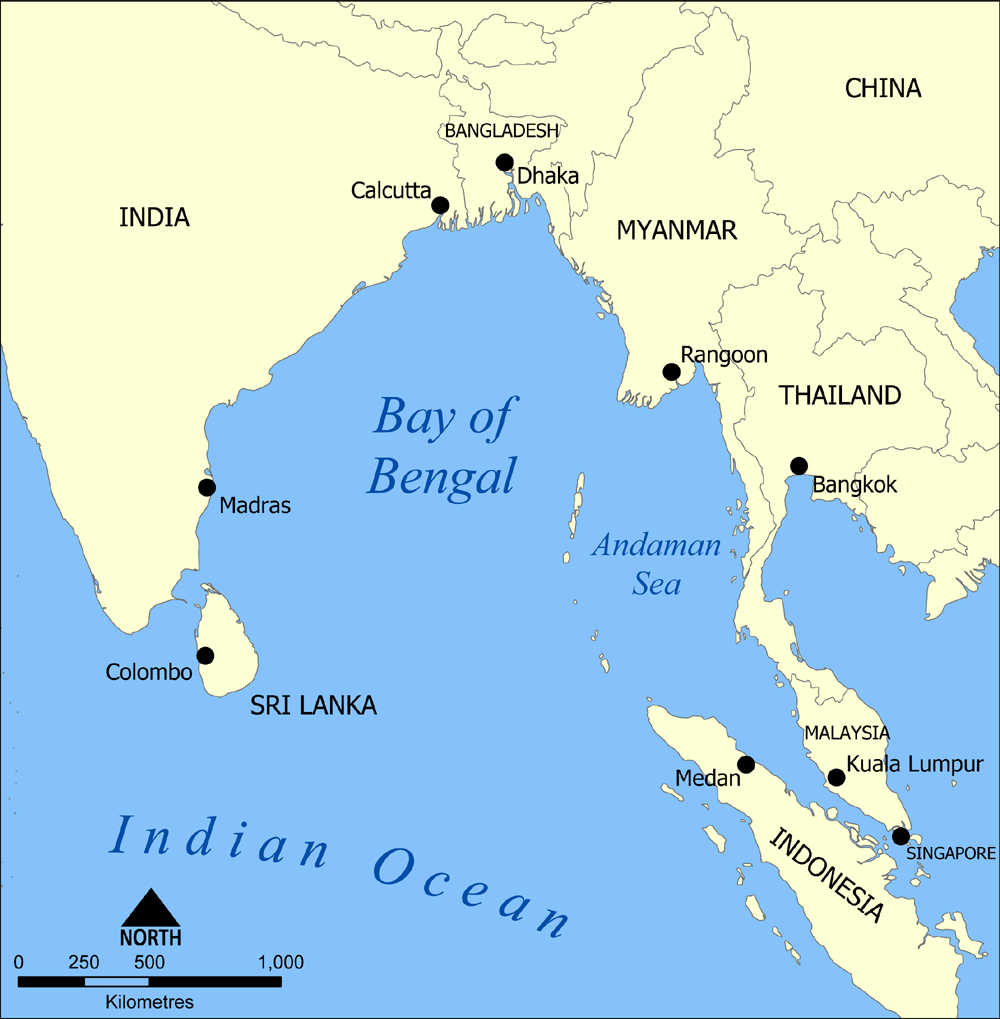
Map showing the Bay of Bengal

On 28 July the Dutch submarine HNLMS O 23, in the Malacca Strait, reported two Japanese heavy cruisers and four destroyers at 5° 32' N, 98° 50' E, moving up the west coast of Thailand. Force V, which had no air cover was cancelled. Somerville judged that the force was a raid on Allied ships in the north of the Bay of Bengal, following the rumours planted in India of preparations for an attack on the Andaman Islands. Force M and Force T sailed on 1 August. After the report by O 23, Force A had sailed from Colombo on 30 July, conducted air reconnaissance and found nothing.

Force A was spotted by a Japanese flying boat at 10:40 a.m. on 1 August and reports were picked up from Tokyo announcing the discovery. Late in the morning of 2 August another flying boat was shot down by a Martlet fighter from Formidable at 9° 26' N, 83° 16' E. Force A returned to Trincomalee late on 2 August as some of the ships were due to participate in Operation Stream, Operation Line and Operation Jane in the Battle of Madagascar. A wireless deception was undertaken to pretend that Force A was in the Bay of Bengal until 18 August.

== Aftermath ==
=== Analysis ===
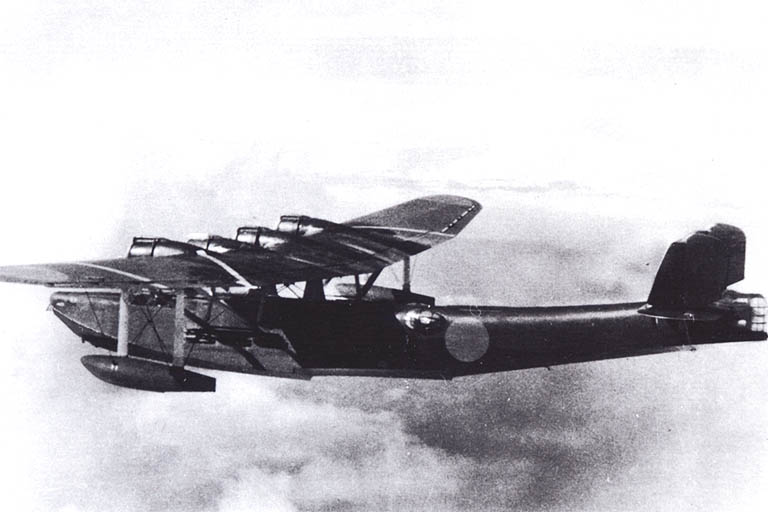
Photograph of a Kawanishi H6K flying boat

While the operation was carried out with no combat losses, the Japanese failed to take the bait and no significant naval or air units were redeployed – although the seaplane tender Sagara Maru was sent to the islands on 4 August and a bomber unit was sent to reinforce Sabang, it could be said to have been a minor success.

=== Casualties ===
Several Japanese aircraft were spotted and a Kawanishi H6K (Mavis) was shot down at 9° 26' N, 83° 16' E by a Martlet from Formidable. Two Martlets and two Fulmars were lost to accidents and engine failure.
