= HNLMS Tjerk Hiddes (G16) =

1941 British-built Dutch warship

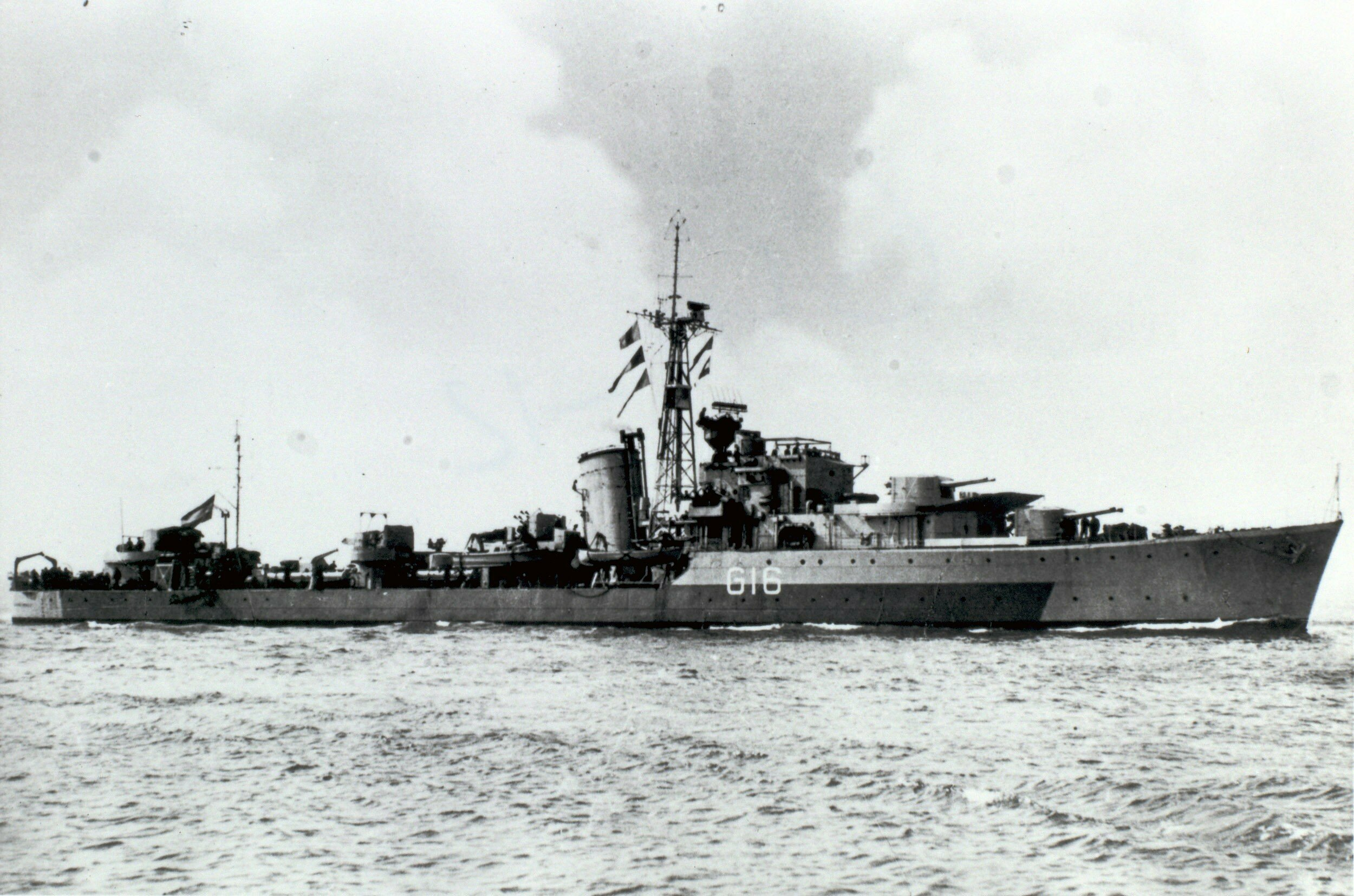
- The camouflaged Tjerk Hiddes, 1942

History

United Kingdom
- Name: HMS Nonpareil
- Builder: William Denny and Brothers, Dumbarton
- Laid down: 22 May 1940
- Launched: 25 June 1941
- Fate: Transferred to Royal Netherlands Navy

Netherlands
- Name: HNLMS Tjerk Hiddes
- Namesake: Tjerk Hiddes de Vries
- Completed: June 1942
- Acquired: 27 May 1942
- Commissioned: 30 October 1942
- Identification: Pennant number: G16
- Fate: Sold to Indonesia, 1 March 1951

Indonesia
- Name: RI Gadjah Mada
- Namesake: Gajah Mada
- Acquired: 1 March 1951
- Fate: Scrapped, 1961

General characteristics (as built)
- Class & type: N-class destroyer
- Displacement: 1,773 long tons (1,801 t) (standard)
- Length: 356 ft 6 in (108.7 m) (o/a)
- Beam: 35 ft 9 in (10.9 m)
- Draught: 12 ft 6 in (3.8 m)
- Installed power: 2 × Admiralty 3-drum boilers; 40,000 shp (30,000 kW)
- Propulsion: 2 shafts; 2 geared steam turbines
- Speed: 36 knots (67 km/h; 41 mph)
- Range: 5,500 nmi (10,200 km; 6,300 mi) at 15 knots (28 km/h; 17 mph)
- Complement: 183
- Sensors & processing systems: ASDIC; Type 285 gunnery radar; Type 286 surface-search radar
- Armament: 3 × twin 4.7 in (120 mm) guns; 1 × single 4 in (102 mm) AA gun; 4 × single 20 mm (0.8 in) Oerlikon AA guns; 2 × twin 0.5 in (12.7 mm) machineguns; 1 × quintuple 21 in (533 mm) torpedo tubes; 1 × depth charge rack, 2 × throwers; 45 × depth charges

The destroyer HNLMS Tjerk Hiddes was a British built, Dutch warship of World War II. She was laid down on 22 May 1940 as a British N-class destroyer and launched on 25 June 1941 as HMS Nonpareil, but on 27 May 1942, she was transferred to the Royal Dutch Navy. The ship was commissioned in 1942 as HNLMS Tjerk Hiddes, named after the 17th century Dutch admiral, Tjerk Hiddes de Vries. Much of her war service was with the Royal Navy and United States Navy in the Indian Ocean and Australia, under the command of W. J. Kruys. Following the war, the destroyer was sold to Indonesia and renamed RI Gadjah Mada. She was scrapped in 1961.

== War service ==
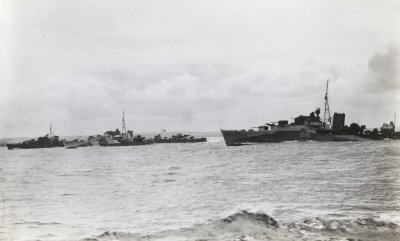
HMS Nonpareil, Offa and Norseman at Scapa Flow, 25 June 1942

Acceptance trials started on 6 May; she was commissioned into the Royal Netherlands Navy service on 27 May and Tjerk Hiddes was allocated to serve with the British Royal Navy's 7th Destroyer Flotilla in the Eastern Fleet.

At Scapa Flow, in June and early July, she worked-up with the Home Fleet and prepared for foreign service. In mid-July at the Clyde, she joined the escort of military convoy WS21P from the Clyde to the Indian Ocean. During the voyage, on 5 August the convoy was augmented by eight ships of Convoy AS4, carrying equipment for the 8th Army in Egypt. On 20 August, Tjerk Hiddes and Nepal left the convoy, sailing to Kilindini, in Kenya.

In September, Tjerk Hiddes joined the forces allocated to support landings to complete the occupation of Madagascar (Operation Streamline Jane), which was under the control of Vichy forces, and participated in preparatory exercises. On 9 September she left Kilindini to rendezvous with the assault convoy and its escort on passage to Majunga for the landings. The two Dutch destroyers, Van Galen and Tjerk Hiddes were deployed as screen for HMS Illustrious.

On 26–27 September, Tjerk Hiddes returned to Kilindini for convoy escort duties in the Indian Ocean. (At this time, other vessels of the 7th Flotilla were returning from detached service in Mediterranean.) Escort duties continued through October until her deployment for convoy defence between Sydney and Fremantle, under the control of the United States 7th Fleet.

On 4, 11 and 15 December 1942, she made three nightly voyages to evacuate around 1000 Australian and Dutch troops as well as civilians from the island of Timor who were caught behind enemy lines after the battle of Timor. Lieutenant commander W. J. Kruys was awarded the U.S. Legion of Merit for the Timor mission. The crew received the Expedition Cross.

Between 18 and 24 February 1943, she was deployed with sister ship Van Galen and cruisers HMAS Adelaide and HNLMS Tromp to escort a troop convoy between Fremantle and Melbourne (Operation Pamphlet; this military convoy was carrying the 9th Australian Division, recalled from the Middle East in response to the apparent Japanese threat to Australia).

In January 1944, the Dutch ships Tjerk Hiddes, Van Galen and Tromp were transferred to the Eastern Fleet. On arrival in Trincomalee in February, Tjerk Hiddes rejoined the 7th Destroyer Flotilla for fleet screening and convoy protection duties in the Indian Ocean. From 22 to 24 February, she joined an unsuccessful search for a German blockade runner en route from Japan to Germany

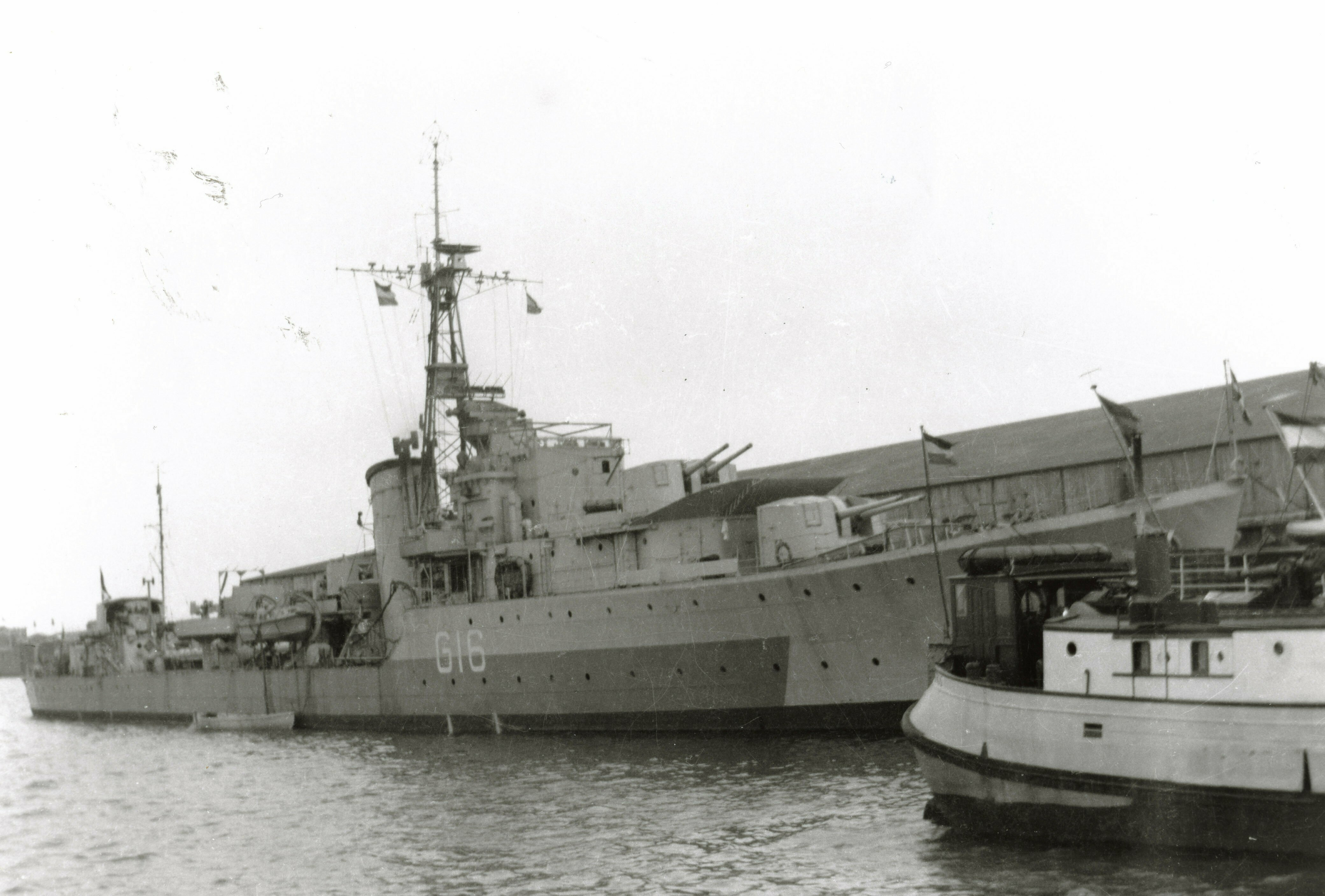
Tjerk Hiddes immediately after the war in Amsterdam

On 22 March, Tjerk Hiddes deployed with a large fleet to practice at-sea refuelling and to rendezvous with the US aircraft carrier USS Saratoga. Saratoga's role was predominantly to act as a mentor for Commonwealth units intended for service in the western Pacific (as the British Pacific Fleet) with the United States Navy, where these units would have to convert to use American procedures. As a part of the retraining, Commonwealth and United States naval aircraft executed attacks on Japanese oil installations. Apart from the training and the damage thus caused, it was hoped that Japanese forces would be diverted from regions where the Americans planned to take the offensive.

Tjerk Hiddes had to return prematurely to Trincomalee on 25 March, with mechanical defects, and remained under repair until June, when she returned to convoy escort duties in the Indian Ocean.

In October 1944, she returned to the United Kingdom, joining the 8th Destroyer Flotilla at Plymouth on convoy duties in the Southwest Approaches. She moved to Dundee for a refit from May to August 1945, by which time the war was over.

== Post war ==
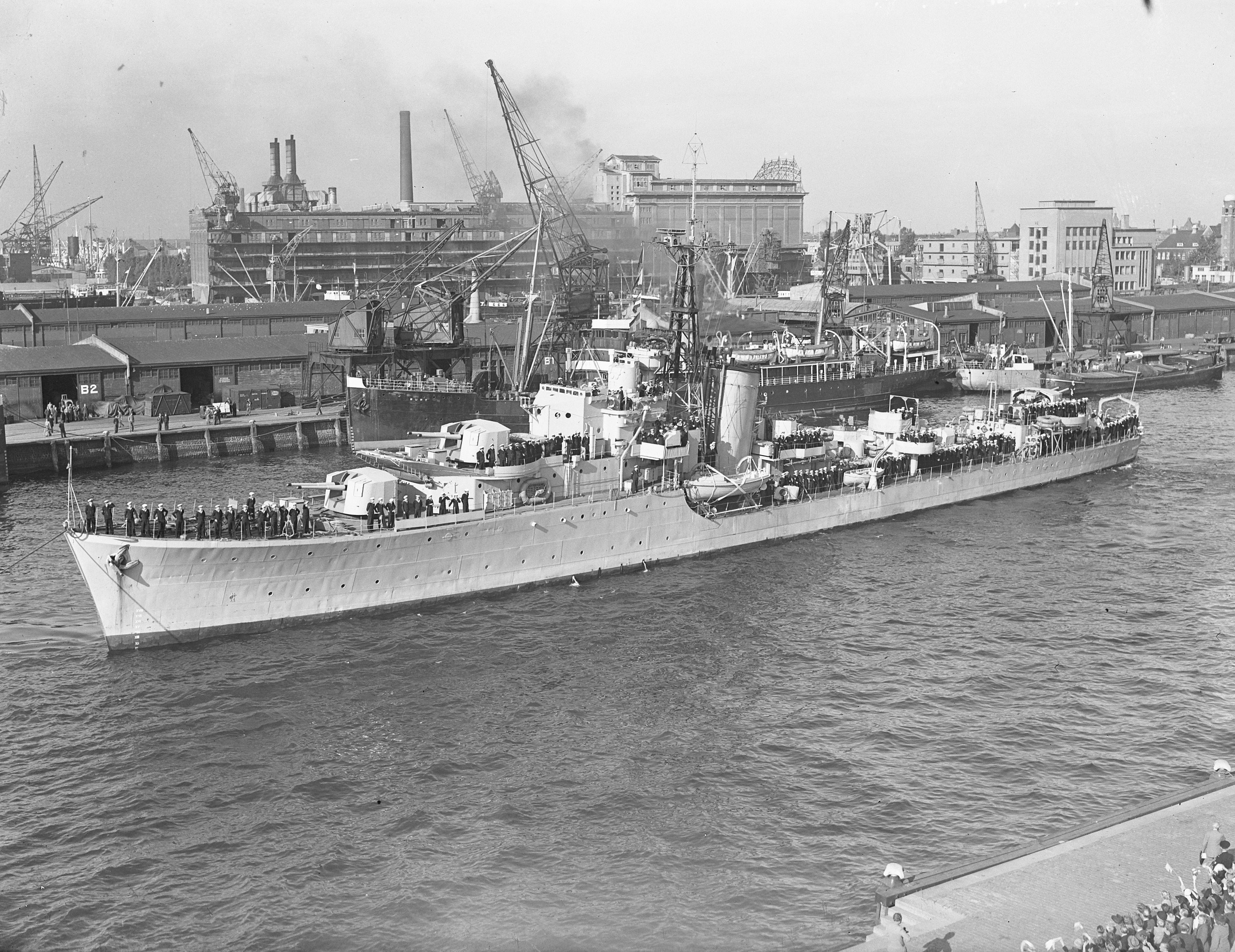
Tjerk Hiddes after her refit, Rotterdam, October 1949

Tjerk Hiddes resumed peace time service with the Royal Netherlands Navy after completion of the refit at Dundee. She returned to the Dutch East Indies, and was transferred to newly independent Indonesia in March 1951. She was renamed RI Gadjah Mada and became the flagship of the Indonesian Navy.

On 17 April 1958, Gadjah Mada took part in Operation 17 August (Indonesian: Operasi 17 Agustus), an amphibious landing to crush PRRI rebellion in West Sumatra. She acted as shore bombardment to support Indonesian Marines landing on Tabing Beach, Padang.

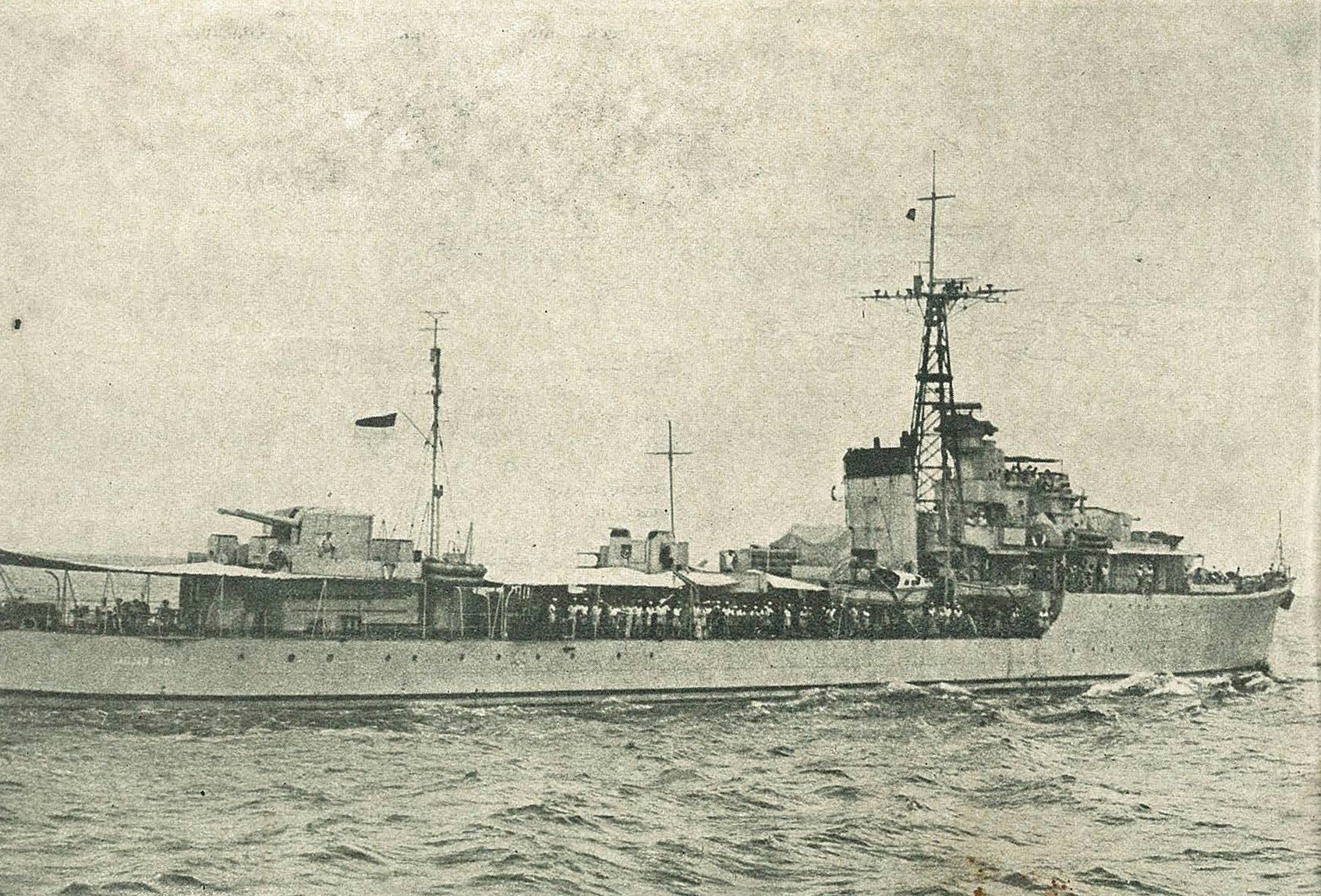
RI Gadjah Mada

In June 1958, destroyer Gadjah Mada along with Bathurst-class corvette RI Pati Unus and Albatros-class corvettes RI Sultan Hasanudin and RI Pattimura took part as shore bombardment in Operation Independence I (Indonesian: Operasi Merdeka I), an amphibious landing at Kema, North Sulawesi to capture the Permesta rebel capital of Manado.

She was removed from the active list in 1961. The ship was scrapped in 1961 by F. Rijsdijk, in Hendrik-Ido-Ambacht.
