= HMAS Nepal =

Destroyer of the Royal Australian navy

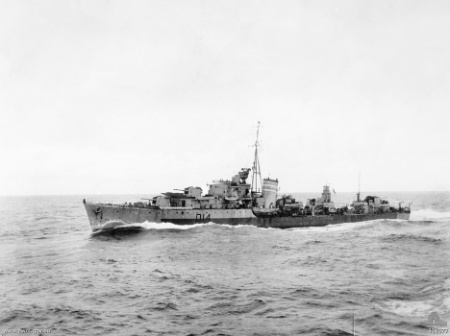

History

Australia
- Namesake: Nepal
- Builder: John I. Thornycroft and Company
- Laid down: 9 September 1939
- Launched: 4 December 1941
- Commissioned: 29 May 1942
- Decommissioned: 22 October 1945
- Honours and awards: Battle honours: Indian Ocean 1942–45; Burma 1944–45; Pacific 1945; Okinawa 1945
- Fate: Broken up for scrap, 1956

General characteristics (as built)
- Class & type: N-class destroyer
- Displacement: 1,773 long tons (1,801 t) (standard); 2,384 long tons (2,422 t) (deep load)
- Length: 356 ft 6 in (108.7 m) (o/a)
- Beam: 35 ft 9 in (10.9 m)
- Draught: 12 ft 6 in (3.8 m)
- Installed power: 40,000 shp (30,000 kW); 2 × Admiralty 3-drum boilers
- Propulsion: 2 shafts; 2 steam turbines
- Speed: 36 knots (67 km/h; 41 mph)
- Range: 5,500 nmi (10,200 km; 6,300 mi) at 15 knots (28 km/h; 17 mph)
- Complement: 183
- Sensors & processing systems: ASDIC; Type 285 gunnery radar; Type 286 radar surface-search radar
- Armament: 3 × twin QF 4.7-inch (120 mm) Mk XII guns; 1 × single QF 4-inch Mk V (102 mm) AA gun; 4 × single 20 mm (0.8 in) Oerlikon AA guns; 2 × twin QF 0.5-inch (12.7 mm) Mk III machineguns; 1 × quintuple 21-inch (533 mm) torpedo tubes; 45 × depth charges, 1 × rack, 2 × throwers

HMAS Nepal (G25/D14) was an N-class destroyer of the Royal Australian Navy (RAN). Launched in 1941 as Norseman, the ship suffered significant damage during an air raid on the John I. Thornycroft and Company shipyard, and during repairs was renamed to recognise Nepal's contribution to the British war effort. Although commissioned into the RAN in 1942, the ship remained the property of the Royal Navy.

Most of Nepal's wartime service was as part of the British Eastern Fleet, operating in the Indian Ocean. The destroyer was involved in Madagascar campaign in 1942, and the Cockpit and Transom air raids in 1944. In early 1945, Nepal was reassigned to the British Pacific Fleet, and operated with them for the rest of the war.

On her return to Sydney in October 1945, Nepal was decommissioned and returned to the Royal Navy who recommissioned her as HMS Nepal. She was scrapped in 1956.

== Design and construction ==
The N-class destroyer had a displacement of 1,760 tons at standard load, and 2,353 tons at full load. Nepal was 356 feet 6 inches (108.66 m) long overall and 229 feet 6 inches (69.95 m) long between perpendiculars, had a beam of 35 feet 8 inches (10.87 m), and a maximum draught of 16 feet 4 inches (4.98 m). Propulsion was provided by Admiralty 3-drum boilers connected to Parsons geared steam turbines, which provided 40,000 shaft horsepower (30,000 kW) to the ship's two propellers. Nepal was capable of reaching 36 knots (67 km/h; 41 mph). The ship's company consisted of 226 officers and sailors.

The ship's armament consisted of six 4.7-inch QF Mark XII guns in three twin mounts, a single 4-inch QF Mark V gun, a 2-pounder 4-barrel Pom Pom, four 0.5-inch machine guns, four 20 mm Oerlikon anti-aircraft guns, four .303 Lewis machine guns, two Pentad dual torpedo launcher tube sets (with 8 torpedoes carried), two depth-charge throwers and one depth-charge chute (with 45 charges carried). The 4-inch gun was removed later in Nepal's career.

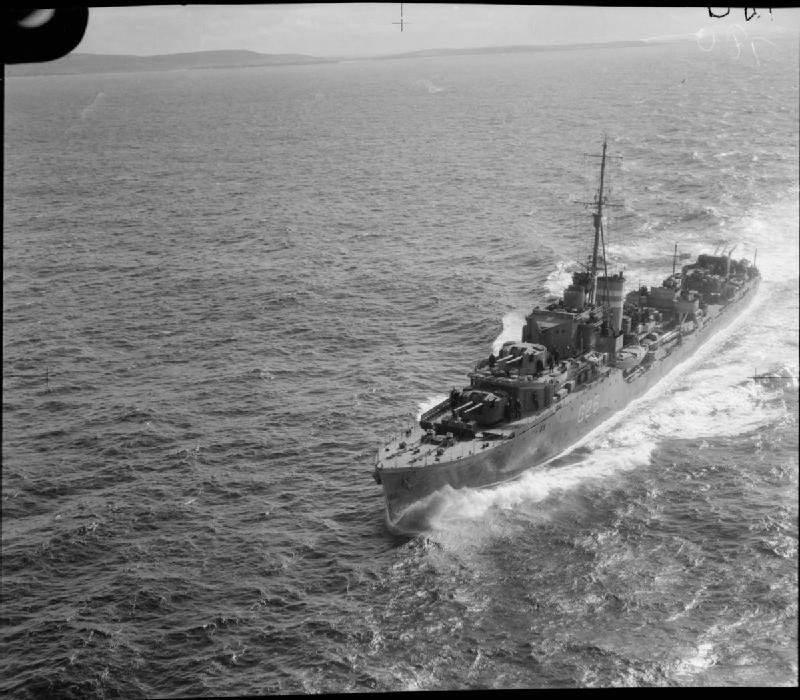
HMAS Nepal underway

The ship was laid down as Norseman by John I. Thornycroft and Company at Woolston, Hampshire on 9 September 1939. She was launched on 4 December 1941. Later in December, an air raid on the shipyard saw Norseman take serious damage; a direct hit nearly cut the destroyer in two. The ship was repaired, during which her name was changed to Nepal, honouring Nepal's contribution to the British war effort. Nepal was commissioned into the RAN on 11 May 1942: although commissioned as an Australian warship, she remained the property of the Royal Navy. The warship cost £402,939 to build.

== Operational history ==
After commissioning, Nepal was assigned to the Home Fleet, based at Scapa Flow. During this time, the ship was filmed to represent the fictional HMS Torrin for the British war film In Which We Serve. In July 1942, the destroyer was reassigned to the British Eastern Fleet, and sailed from Scotland to Kenya. During September, the destroyer was involved in the later parts of the Madagascar campaign. During the rest of 1942, the destroyer operated on convoy escort runs and anti-submarine patrols from Kilindini. In March 1943, Nepal sailed to Australia for a two-month refit during April and May.

Nepal returned to the Indian Ocean in June 1943, and resumed operations with the Eastern Fleet, this time from Trincomalee. In April 1944, the destroyer was part of the carrier escort screen during Operation Cockpit, then again in May for Operation Transom. In August, the destroyer returned to Australia for refit, then was assigned to escort the aircraft carrier HMS Victorious during late November and early December. From 7 December 1944 to 12 February 1945, Nepal and sister ship HMAS Napier were involved in supporting the 74th Indian Infantry Brigade. During this, on 5 February, Nepal damaged one of her propellers when it struck a submerged rock in the Kaleindaung River, but was able to keep operating on one propeller until the end of the deployment.

At the start of March 1945, Nepal was assigned to the British Pacific Fleet; her pennant number was changed from G25 to D14. The destroyer remained with the Pacific Fleet until after the end of World War II. Nepal earned four battle honours for her wartime service: "Indian Ocean 1942–44", "Burma 1944–45", "Pacific 1945", and "Okinawa 1945".

== Decommissioning and fate ==
Nepal arrived in Sydney on 22 October, and was decommissioned and returned to the Royal Navy. She was recommissioned as HMS Nepal and sailed back to the UK arriving on 28 December 1945 – some three and a half years after leaving. After repairs and having her armament removed she initially was used as a minesweeper trials ship in the Channel. Subsequently Nepal became a sea training vessel attached to HMS Lochinvar, Port Edgar, on The Firth of Forth.

She was reduced to the reserve in early 1951 and was nominated for a Type 15 conversion but no work was carried out before May 1954 when it was cancelled. Nepal was passed to the British Iron & Steel Corporation in January 1956 who allocated her to the Briton Ferry yard of Thos. W. Ward for scrapping where she arrived on 16 January.
