= Lochinvar (disambiguation) =

Lochinvar is a loch in southern Scotland.

Lochinvar may also refer to the following:

== Places ==
- Lochinvar, New South Wales, a village in Australia
  - Lochinvar railway station, serving the village
- Lochinvar, a locality in Lacombe County, Alberta, Canada
- Lochinvar (Pontotoc, Mississippi), a 19th-century plantation, listed on the U.S. National Register of Historic Places in Mississippi
- Lochinvar National Park, Zambia

== Arts and entertainment ==
- A knight in the poem Marmion by Sir Walter Scott
  - A knight in the 1924 film Young Lochinvar, based on Sir Walter Scott's character
- Lochinvar, S. R. Crockett's 1897 novel
- A song on the album Powerglide by New Riders of the Purple Sage
- An instrumental on the Rod Stewart album Smiler composed by Pete Sears

== Other uses ==
- HMS Lochinvar, one ship and two shore establishments of the Royal Navy
- MV Lochinvar, a ferry operated by Caledonian MacBrayne
- Lord Lochinvar, a title in the Peerage of Scotland
- Lochinvar Corporation, a producer of water heaters
- Lochinvar School, Longtown, Cumbria, a secondary school until 2008

== See also ==
- Lochinver, a village in northern Scotland
