= J-, K- and N-class destroyer =

Destroyer

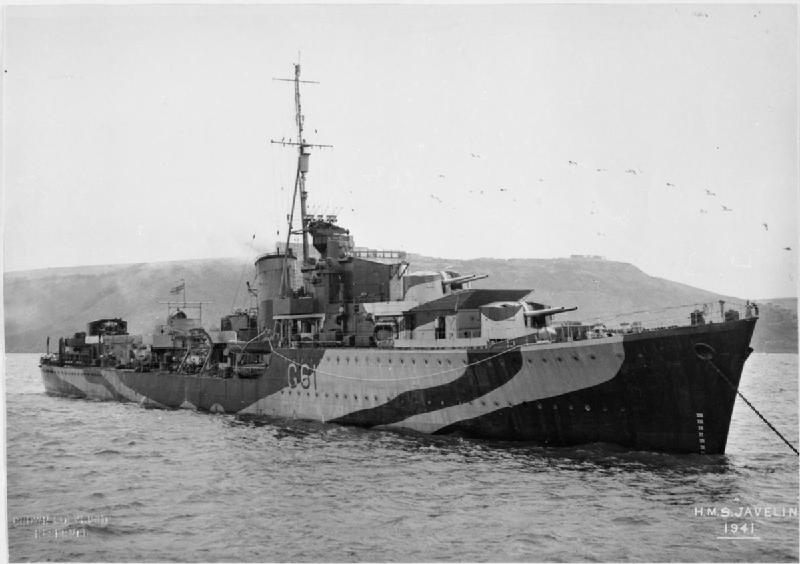
- HMS Javelin in 1941

Class overview
- Operators: Royal Navy; Royal Australian Navy; Polish Navy; Royal Netherlands Navy; Indonesian Navy
- Preceded by: Tribal class
- Succeeded by: L and M class
- Subclasses: J, K, N
- Built: 1937–1941
- Planned: 25
- Completed: 24
- Cancelled: 1
- Lost: 13
- Scrapped: 11

General characteristics (J and K classes as built)
- Type: Destroyer
- Displacement: 1,690 long tons (1,720 t) (standard); 2,330 long tons (2,370 t) (deep load)
- Length: 356 ft 6 in (108.7 m) o/a
- Beam: 35 ft 9 in (10.9 m)
- Draught: 12 ft 6 in (3.8 m) (deep)
- Installed power: 2 × Admiralty 3-drum boilers; 44,000 shp (33,000 kW)
- Propulsion: 2 × shafts; 2 × geared steam turbines
- Speed: 36 knots (67 km/h; 41 mph)
- Range: 5,500 nmi (10,200 km; 6,300 mi) at 15 knots (28 km/h; 17 mph)
- Complement: 183 (218 for flotilla leaders)
- Sensors & processing systems: ASDIC
- Armament: 3 × twin 4.7 in (120 mm) guns; 1 × quadruple 2 pdr (40 mm (1.6 in) AA guns; 2 × quadruple 0.5 in (12.7 mm) anti-aircraft machineguns; 2 × quintuple 21 in (533 mm) torpedo tubes; 1 × rack, 2 × throwers for depth charges

General characteristics (N class where different)
- Displacement: 1,773 long tons (1,801 t) (standard); 2,384 long tons (2,422 t) (deep load)
- Armament: 1 × single 4 in (102 mm) AA gun; 4 × single 20 mm (0.8 in) Oerlikon AA guns; 2 × twin 0.5 in anti-aircraft machineguns; 1 × quintuple 21 in torpedo tubes; 1 × rack, 2 × throwers for depth charges

The J, K and N class consisted of 24 destroyers built for the Royal Navy beginning in 1938. They were a return to a smaller vessel, with a heavier torpedo armament, after the Tribal class that emphasised guns over torpedoes. The ships were built in three flotillas or groups, each consisting of eight ships with names beginning with "J", "K" and "N". The flag superior of the pennant numbers changed from "F" to "G" in 1940.

The ships were modified throughout their wartime service, particularly their anti-aircraft (AA) guns; they were also fitted with radar.

== Design history ==
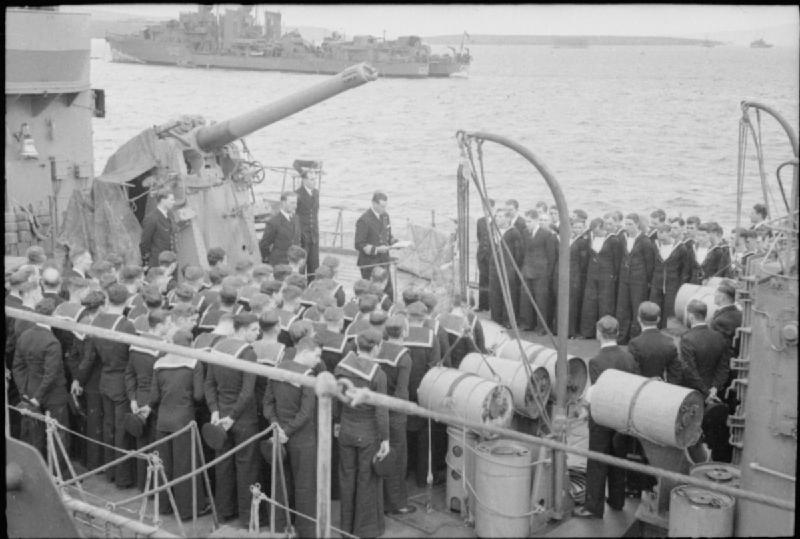
Church service aboard HMS Javelin, August 1940. Note the 4-inch QF Mk V anti-aircraft gun at upper left and the depth charges at bottom right

The design was intended as a smaller follow-on from the preceding Tribal class. In a departure from all previous Royal Navy destroyers, the design used a two boiler room layout. This reduced hull length and allowed for a single funnel, both reducing the profile and increasing the arcs of fire of the light anti-aircraft (AA) weapons. It also increased vulnerability, as there were now two adjacent large compartments with the resultant risk of a single well-placed hit flooding both and resulting in a total loss of boiler power.

A three-boiler-room layout was used starting with the F class in the early 1930s. Early ships also tended to use twin boiler rooms, which are still a great improvement over a single boiler room. As destroyers are lightly armoured and fast vessels meant to survive by avoiding being hit at all, the odds of a hit striking just the right spot to disable both boiler rooms simultaneously were considered remote enough to be worth risking in exchange for the benefits given by a two-room layout. During pre-war trials "...On a light displacement Jackal attained 37.492 kn (69.435 km/h; 43.145 mph) on the Arran mile in 60 fathoms (360 feet) 34.37 kn (63.65 km/h; 39.55 mph) deep. Jupiter in 75 fathoms (450 feet) made 33.835 kn (62.662 km/h; 38.937 mph) light, 33.045 kn (61.199 km/h; 38.028 mph) deep displacement".

A significant advancement in construction techniques was developed by naval architect Albert Percy Cole. Instead of going for transverse frame sections which were unnecessarily strong, but held together by weak longitudinals, Cole opted for extra strong longitudinals and weaker transverse frames. Another advancement was changes to the bow design. The bow form was also modified from that of the preceding Tribal-class design; the clipper bow was replaced by a straight stem with increased sheer. This change was not a success and as a consequence, these ships were very wet forwards. This shortcoming was rectified from the S class onward by returning to the earlier form. Despite the vulnerability of the boiler layout, the design was to prove compact, strong and very successful, forming the basis of all Royal Navy destroyer construction from the O class up to the last of the C class of 1943–1945.

The armament was based on that of the Tribals, but replaced one twin QF 4.7-inch (120 mm) Mark XII (L/45) gun mount with an additional bank of torpedo tubes. The gun mountings were capable of 40° elevation and 340° of training. Curiously, 'X' mounting was positioned such that the blind 20° arc was across the stern, rather than the more logical forward position where fire was obscured by the bridge and masts anyway. Though this meant that they were unable to fire dead astern, with a train rate of 10 degrees per second, this did allow for much faster traversing from one beam to the other when manoeuvring & engaging targets off the bow with the full battery. With the tubes now 'pentad', a heavy load of 10 21-inch (533 mm) Mark IX torpedoes could be carried. AA armament remained the same, consisting of a quadruple QF 2-pounder (40 mm (1.6 in) Mark VIII gun mount and a pair of quadruple 0.5-inch (12.7 mm) Vickers Mark III machine gun mounts. Armament was further improved by replacing the quadruple machine guns with 20 mm Oerlikons. These ships, when completed, had a comparatively heavy close range AA armament. Fire control arrangements also differed from the Tribals, and the dedicated high-angle (H/A) rangefinder director was not fitted, instead only a 12 ft (3.7 m) rangefinder was carried behind the nominally dual purpose Director Control Tower (DCT). The rangefinder was much modified to allow it to control the main armament for A/A fire, and was known as the "3 man modified rangefinder". These ships used the Fuze Keeping Clock HA Fire Control Computer.

The N class were ordered in 1940 as repeats of the J design, after delays and cost over-runs associated with the larger and more complicated L and M class. The only design change was to locate the 'X' 4.7-inch mounting in the more logical position with the 20° training blind spot forward. While building, the same early wartime modifications as the Js and Ks were applied, with a pair of twin power-operated 0.5 in machine gun turrets briefly carried on the quarterdeck before being replaced by single 20 mm Oerlikons.

== Modifications ==
In 1940 and 1941, to improve the anti-aircraft capabilities, all ships had their aft torpedo tubes removed and replaced with a single 4 inch gun QF Mark V on a HA Mark III mounting. The relatively ineffective multiple 0.5-inch machine guns were replaced with a single 20 mm Oerlikon, with a further pair added abreast the searchlight platform amidships. The high-speed destroyer mine sweeps were replaced with a rack and two throwers for 45 depth charges and a Type 286 Radar air warning was added at the masthead alongside Type 285 fire control on the H/A rangefinder-director.

In 1942 the 4 in gun was removed and the torpedoes returned to all surviving vessels. The 20 mm Oerlikons were replaced with twin mountings (except those on the quarterdeck) and a Type 291 radar replaced the Type 286. Jervis, Kelvin, Nerissa and Norman had the searchlight replaced with the "lantern" for centimetric target indication radar Type 271; Javelin and Kimberley having the lighter Type 272 fitted at the truck of the foremast. Napier, Nizam and Norseman (and later, Norman) had American SG1 Radar fitted at the head of a new lattice foremast, Norman replacing her Type 271 set with a single 40 mm Bofors gun. By the end of the war, the surviving J and K ships carried a lattice mast with a Type 293 target indication radar at the truck and a Type 291 air warning at the head.

== Service ==
Being amongst the Royal Navy's most modern and powerful destroyers at the outbreak of war, they were extensively committed. As a result, losses were heavy. Of 24 ships built 13 were lost (six J, six K and one N class), mostly in the Mediterranean in 1941–1942, although they did serve against the Japanese later in the war. France was expected to deal with most of the enemy threat in the Mediterranean, so the French capitulation resulted in heavy British losses in the Mediterranean as the British were unable to allocate many resources to the region. The remainder were scrapped after the war.

== Ships ==
=== J class ===
Construction data
Name	Builder	Laid down	Launched	Completed	Fate
Jervis (Note: Flotilla leader)	Hawthorn Leslie & Company, Hebburn	26 August 1937	9 September 1938	12 May 1939	Sold for scrap, 1949
Jackal	John Brown & Company, Clydebank	24 September 1937	25 October 1938	31 March 1939	Bombed off Mersa Matruh, 11 May 1942, and scuttled the following day
Jaguar	William Denny & Brothers, Dumbarton	25 November 1937	22 November 1938	12 September 1939	Sunk by the German submarine U-652, 26 March 1942
Juno (ex-Jamaica)	Fairfield Shipbuilding & Engineering Company, Govan	15 October 1937	8 December 1938	25 August 1939	Sunk by aircraft, 21 May 1941
Janus	Swan Hunter & Wigham Richardson, Wallsend	29 September 1937	11 October 1938	5 August 1939	Sunk by German aircraft, 23 January 1944
Javelin (ex-Kashmir)	John Brown & Company, Clydebank	11 October 1937	21 December 1938	10 June 1939	Sold for scrap, 1949
Jersey	J. Samuel White, Cowes	20 September 1937	26 September 1938	28 April 1939	Mined, 2 May 1941, and sank 2 days later
Jupiter	Yarrow & Company, Scotstoun	28 September 1937	27 October 1938	25 June 1939	Hit a mine during the battle of the Java Sea, 27 February 1942, and sank the following day
Jubilant	—N/a	—N/a	—N/a	—N/a	Ordered March 1937, cancelled December 1937

=== K class ===
Construction data
Name	Builder	Laid down	Launched	Completed	Fate
Kelly (Note: Flotilla leader)	Hawthorn Leslie & Company, Hebburn	26 August 1937	25 October 1938	23 August 1939	Sunk by German aircraft, 23 May 1941
Kandahar	William Denny & Brothers, Dumbarton	18 January 1938	21 March 1939	10 October 1939	Mined off Tripoli, 19 December 1941, and later scuttled
Kashmir (ex-Javelin)	Thornycroft, Woolston	18 November 1937	4 April 1939	26 October 1939	Bombed by German aircraft, 23 May 1941
Kelvin	Fairfield Shipbuilding, Govan	5 October 1937	19 January 1939	27 November 1939	Sold for scrap, 1949
Khartoum	Swan Hunter, Wallsend	27 October 1937	6 February 1939	6 November 1939	Sank in Perim Harbour after an exploding torpedo air vessel started a fire which reached the aft magazine, 23 June 1940
Kimberley	Thornycroft, Woolston	17 January 1938	1 June 1939	21 February 1940	Sold for scrap, 1949
Kingston	J. Samuel White, Cowes	6 October 1937	9 January 1939	14 September 1939	Seriously damaged by the Italian battleship Littorio during the Second Battle of Sirte, 22 March 1942. Bombed by German aircraft while in dry dock, 11 April 1942, and written off as a constructive total loss.
Kipling	Yarrow & Company, Scotstoun	26 October 1937	19 January 1939	22 December 1939	Bombed and sunk by German aircraft off Mersa Matruh, 11 May 1942

=== N class ===
Note: The N-class destroyers of the Royal Australian Navy were crewed and commissioned by the Australians, but remained the property of the British government.

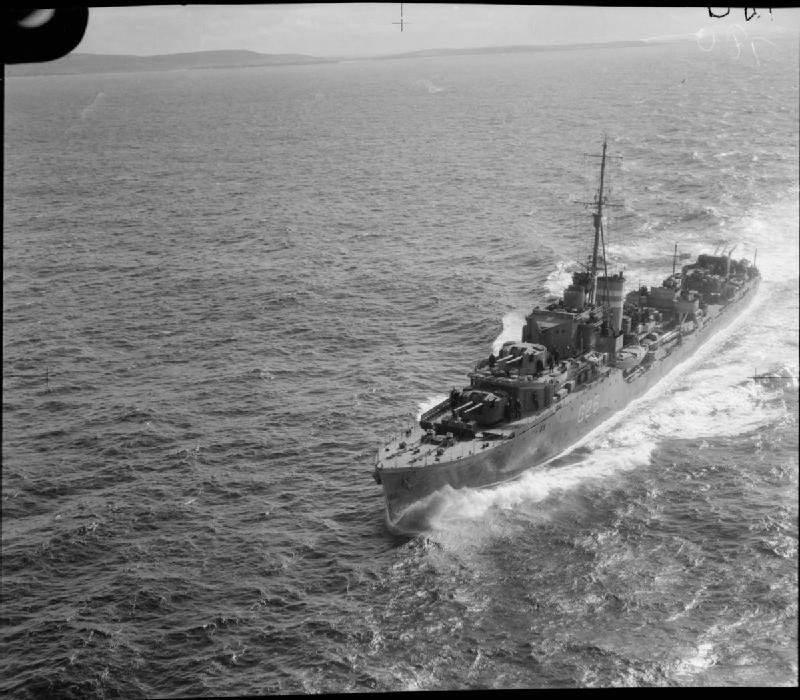
HMAS Nepal underway

Construction data for N-class destroyers of the Royal Netherlands Navy
Name	Builder	Laid down	Launched	Completed	Fate
Noble	Denny	10 July 1939	17 April 1941	20 February 1942	To the Netherlands as Van Galen 1942, sold for scrap, 1957
Nonpareil	Denny	22 May 1940	25 June 1941	30 October 1942	To Netherlands as Tjerk Hiddes 1942. To Indonesia as Gadjah Mada 1951, sold for scrap, 1961

Construction data for N-class destroyers of the Royal Australian Navy
Name	Builder	Laid down	Launched	Completed	Fate
Napier (Note: Flotilla leader)	Fairfield	26 July 1939	22 May 1940	11 December 1940	Sold for scrap, 1955
Nestor	Fairfield	26 July 1939	9 July 1940	12 February 1941	Bombed by Italian aircraft, 15 June 1942, and scuttled
Nizam	John Brown	27 July 1939	4 July 1940	19 December 1940	Sold for scrap, 1955
Norman	Thornycroft	27 July 1939	30 October 1940	29 September 1941	Sold for scrap, 1958
Nepal (ex-Norseman)	Thornycroft	9 September 1939	4 December 1941	29 May 1942	Sold for scrap, 1955

Construction data for N-class destroyers of the Polish Navy
Name	Builder	Laid down	Launched	Completed	Fate
Nerissa	John Brown	26 July 1939	7 May 1940	12 February 1941	To Poland as Piorun 1940, returned as HMS Noble 1946, sold for scrap in 1955
