= HMAS Nizam =

1940 N-class destroyer

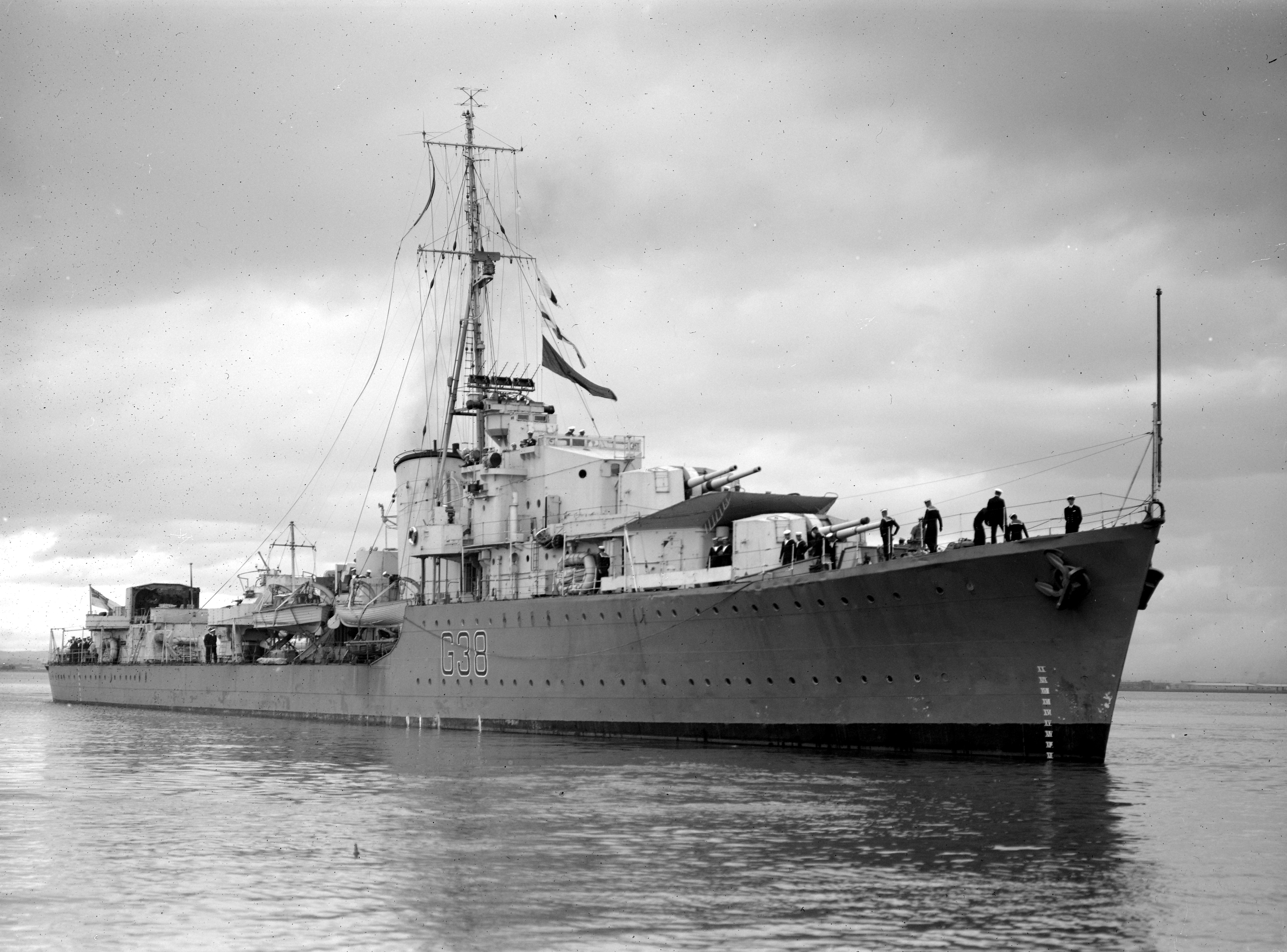
- HMAS Nizam in May 1945

History

Australia
- Name: Nizam
- Namesake: Sir Osman Ali Khan, The Last Nizam of Hyderabad
- Builder: John Brown & Company
- Laid down: 27 July 1939
- Launched: 4 July 1940
- Commissioned: 19 December 1940
- Decommissioned: 17 October 1945
- Honours and awards: Battle honours: Malta Convoys 1941–42; Crete 1941; Libya 1941; Mediterranean 1941; Indian Ocean 1942–44; Pacific 1943; Okinawa 1945
- Fate: Returned to RN, not returned to service, scrapped in 1956

General characteristics (as built)
- Class & type: N-class destroyer
- Displacement: 1,773 long tons (1,801 t) (standard)
- Length: 356 ft 6 in (108.7 m) (o/a)
- Beam: 35 ft 9 in (10.9 m)
- Draught: 12 ft 6 in (3.8 m)
- Installed power: 2 × Admiralty 3-drum boilers; 40,000 shp (30,000 kW)
- Propulsion: 2 shafts; 2 steam turbines
- Speed: 36 knots (67 km/h; 41 mph)
- Range: 5,500 nmi (10,200 km; 6,300 mi) at 15 knots (28 km/h; 17 mph)
- Complement: 183
- Sensors & processing systems: ASDIC; Type 285 gunnery radar; Type 286 radar surface-search radar
- Armament: 3 × twin 4.7 in (120 mm) guns; 1 × single 4 in (102 mm) AA gun; 1 × quadruple 2 pdr (40 mm (1.6 in)) AA gun; 4 × single 20 mm (0.8 in) AA guns; 2 × twin 0.5-inch (12.7 mm) machineguns; 1 × quintuple 21 in (533 mm) torpedo tubes; 45 × depth charges, 1 × rack, 2 × throwers

HMAS Nizam (G38/D15) was an N-class destroyer of the Royal Australian Navy (RAN). The destroyer, named after Osman Ali Khan, the last Nizam of Hyderabad, was commissioned into the RAN in 1940, although the ship remained the property of the Royal Navy for her entire career.

Nizam spent the early part of her service in the Atlantic, then was reassigned to the Mediterranean, where she was involved in the Crete and Syria-Lebanon Campaigns, the Tobruk Ferry Service, and the Malta Convoys. During 1942, the destroyer was involved in Operation Vigorous and the Madagascar Campaign. The next year saw the ship involved in patrols of the Indian and South Atlantic oceans, searching for German ships and submarines, and rescuing the survivors of U-boat attacks. After returning to Australia for a refit at the end of 1944, ten sailors were washed overboard in February 1945, with none ever seen again. The rest of World War II was spent operating in the Philippines and New Guinea regions.

After returning to Australia in late 1945, Nizam was decommissioned and returned to the Royal Navy. The ship was not returned to active service, and was broken up for scrap in 1956.

== Design and construction ==
The N-class destroyer had a displacement of 1,773 tons at standard load, and 2,554 tons at full load. Nizam was 356 feet 6 inches (108.66 m) long overall and 229 feet 6 inches (69.95 m) long between perpendiculars, had a beam of 35 feet 8 inches (10.87 m), and a maximum draught of 16 feet 4 inches (4.98 m). Propulsion was provided by Admiralty 3-drum boilers connected to Parsons geared steam turbines, which provided 40,000 shaft horsepower to the ship's two propellers. Nizam was capable of reaching 36 knots (67 km/h; 41 mph). The ship's company consisted of 226 officers and sailors.

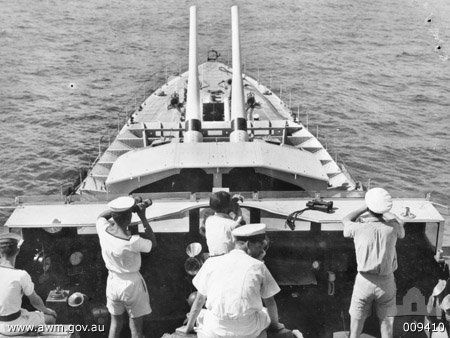
View looking down on Nizam's bridge and the forward 4.7-inch gun turret

The ship's armament consisted of six 4.7-inch QF Mark XII guns in three twin mounts, a single 4-inch QF Mark V gun, a 2-pounder 4-barrel Pom Pom, four 0.5-inch machine guns, four 20 mm Oerlikon anti-aircraft guns, four .303 Lewis machine guns, ten 21-inch torpedo tubes in two Pentad mounts, and a complement of depth charges.

HMAS Nizam was laid down by John Brown and Company, Limited, at Clydebank in Scotland on 27 July 1939. She was launched by the wife of Sir Holberry Mensforth, a director of John Brown, on 4 July 1940. The ship was commissioned on 19 December 1940; an error in a file at Navy Office caused some sources to incorrectly record the commissioning date as 8 January 1941. Although commissioned into the RAN, the destroyer was on loan from the Royal Navy. HMAS Nizam was paid for and named after Sir Osman Ali Khan, The Last Nizam of Hyderabad.

== Operational history ==
After completing sea trials, Nizam was assigned to Scapa Flow, where she was assigned to fleet duties, then retasked as an escort for convoys crossing the Atlantic. In April 1941, the destroyer joined a convoy sailing to Gibraltar, then sailed around Africa to meet the troop transports Queen Mary and Queen Elizabeth, which Nizam helped escort to Alexandria. Around the same time, all watchkeeping sailors staged a mutiny in response to alterations to watchkeeping and messing arrangements by locking themselves into their messdeck compartments. Following mediation between the sailors and the officers, the captain agreed to restore the original arrangements and decided not to charge the sailors, after which the watchkeepers returned to duty.

On 21 May, Nizam participated in the shelling of Scarpanto, then became involved in the Battle of Crete. The destroyer transported commandos from Alexandria to Suda Bay, and returned with wounded. When the campaign turned for the worse, Nizam and Napier made two evacuation runs to ferry troops from the island to Alexandria. Following the unsuccessful campaign, Nizam was assigned to the Syria-Lebanon Campaign for three weeks, then retasked to the Tobruk Ferry Service, a force of British and Australian warships making supply runs to the Allied forces under siege in Tobruk. Nizam made fourteen runs before receiving damage on 14 September; a near-miss from a bomb cracked oil pumps, and the destroyer was towed away from the area by the destroyer HMS Kingston, then was able to make temporary repairs and reach Alexandria.

After repairs were completed, Nizam spent the rest of 1941 escorting Malta Convoys, on bombardment operations in north Africa, and transporting troops to Cyprus and Haifa. On 21 October 1941 Nizam was part of a convoy which came under Stuka dive bomber attack while evacuating Australian infantry Rats of Tobruk to Alexandria. Twenty fully kitted troops were swept overboard during evasion manoeuvres, six being lost at sea and never recovered.

At the start of 1942, Nizam and her sister ship, Napier sailed for Singapore to join Nestor as escort for the aircraft carrier HMS Indomitable. In June, the N class ships joined the escort of a large convoy to Malta, during which Nestor was sunk by aircraft. Nizam and her sisters were assigned to the Madagascar Campaign during September. On 22 September, Nizam was assigned to Durban to patrol for Vichy French merchant ships, capturing one and forcing another to scuttle during the week spent in this role. The destroyer then sailed to Simon's Town in South Africa for a refit, which lasted until the end of the year.

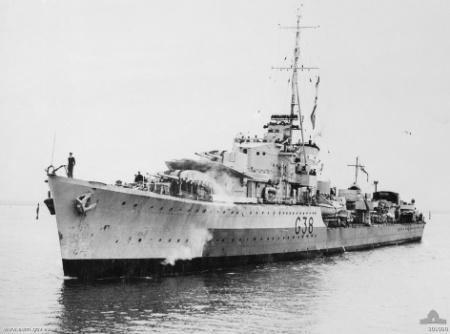
Nizam in Port Phillip during late 1944, shortly before entering refit in Melbourne

After refitting, Nizam was attached to the British Eastern Fleet, and participated in sweeps of the Indian Ocean for enemy ships. She was then reassigned to the South Atlantic for shipping protection. On 13 July 1943, the destroyer rescued survivors from an American liberty ship sunk by German submarine U-511. On 31 July, Nizam rescued survivors from a British merchant ship sunk by German submarine U-177. After delivering the British survivors ashore, Nizam made for Australia, and docked in Melbourne on 18 August for an eight-week refit. The ship returned to operations in the Indian Ocean, and on 17 October was unsuccessfully fired on by a German U-boat. Between late 1943 and early 1944, the destroyer was based in Kenya, then was transferred on 8 March to the Bay of Bengal. During her time based here, Nizam participated in Operation Cockpit, a carrier air raid on Japanese assets in south-east Asia. In November, the destroyer sailed to Melbourne for another refit. In a tragedy which harked back to that of 21 October 1941, on 11 February 1945, while crossing the Great Australian Bight in poor weather after the refit, Nizam was hit by a freak wave which caused the ship to roll almost eighty degrees to port, and washed ten sailors overboard, none of whom were ever seen again.

During 1945, Nizam was assigned to the Philippines and New Guinea theatres as part of the British Pacific Fleet, during which, her pennant number was changed from G38 to D15. On 15 August 1945, Nizam received orders to cease hostilities; shortly after this, the ship was attacked by a Japanese fighter, which was shot down. Nizam was present in Tokyo Bay for the Japanese surrender, and served as duty destroyer on 2 September, the day the Japanese Instrument of Surrender was signed. The destroyer left for Australia on 24 September.

Nizam earned seven battle honours for her wartime service: "Malta Convoys 1941–42", "Crete 1941", "Libya 1941", "Mediterranean 1941", "Indian Ocean 1942–44", "Pacific 1943", and "Okinawa 1945".

== Decommissioning and fate ==
Nizam was decommissioned on 17 October 1945 and returned to the Royal Navy; her ship's company transferred to HMAS Quadrant, and the N-class destroyer was temporarily recommissioned as HMS Nizam for the voyage to England. The ship was not returned to active service and was passed to the British Iron & Steel Corporation in 1955 who allocated her to Thos. W. Ward for scrapping at their yard in Grays.
