= HMS Lochinvar =

One ship, and two shore establishments, of the Royal Navy have borne the name HMS Lochinvar:

- HMS Lochinvar (1915) was a Laforey-class destroyer built as HMS Malice, but renamed before being launched in 1915. She was sold for breaking up in 1921.
- HMS Lochinvar (shore establishment) was a minesweeper training base at Port Edgar, commissioned in 1939. It became an active minesweeper base in 1941, and moved to Granton in 1943. It was paid off in 1948 but immediately recommissioned as a minesweeping trials establishment, becoming an independent command in 1951. The base was paid off in 1975.
- HMS Lochinvar II was an accounting base at Granton in 1946, and at Port Edgar between 1946 and 1947.
