= HMAS Napier =

1940 N-class destroyer

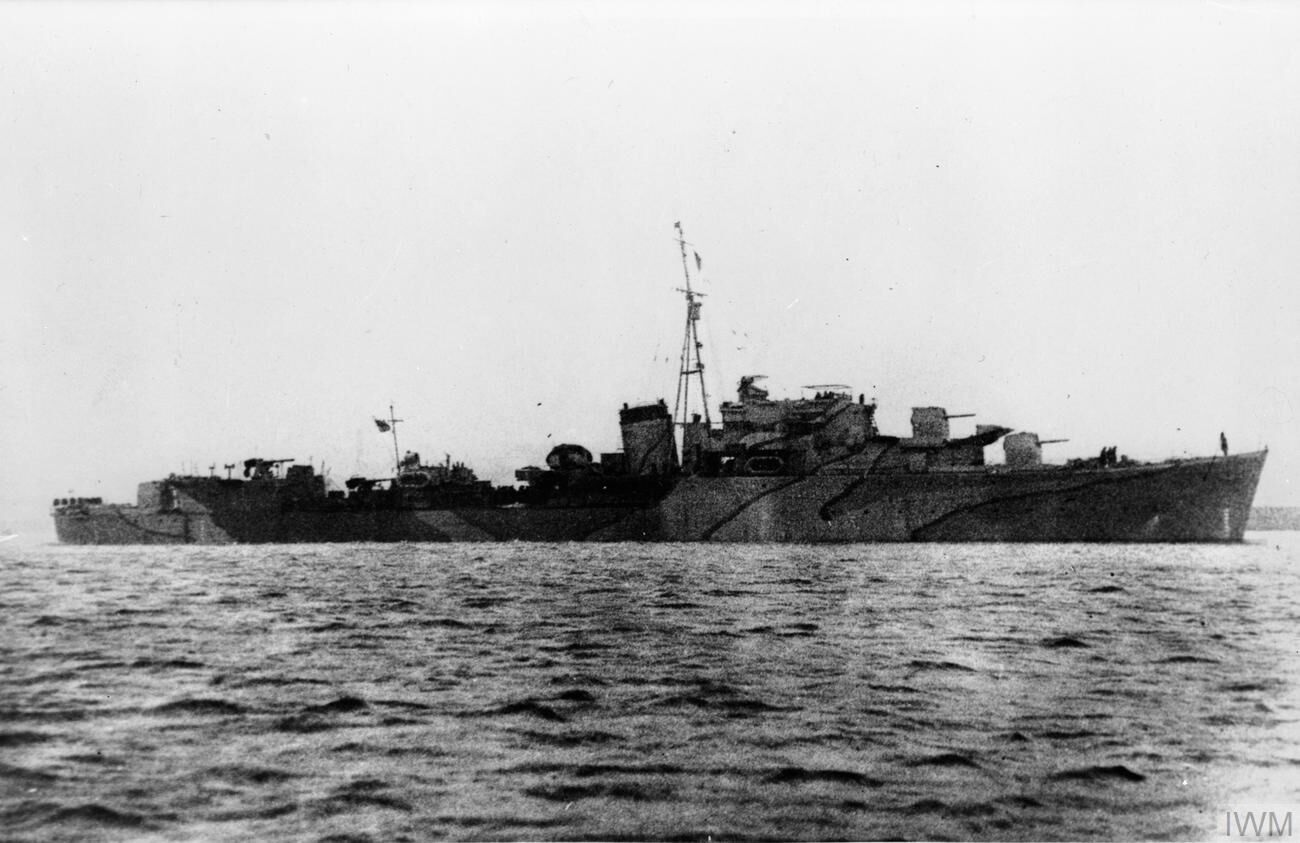
- HMAS Napier

History

Australia
- Namesake: Admiral Sir Charles Napier
- Ordered: 1939
- Builder: Fairfield Shipbuilding and Engineering
- Laid down: 26 July 1939
- Launched: 22 May 1940
- Commissioned: 28 November 1940
- Decommissioned: 25 October 1945
- Honours and awards: Battle honours: Crete 1941; Libya 1941; Indian Ocean 1942–44; Burma 1944–45; Pacific 1945; Okinawa 1945
- Fate: Returned to Royal Navy 1945 and scrapped 1956

General characteristics (as built)
- Class & type: N-class destroyer
- Displacement: 1,773 long tons (1,801 t) (standard); 2,384 long tons (2,422 t) (deep load)
- Length: 356 ft 6 in (108.7 m) (o/a)
- Beam: 35 ft 9 in (10.9 m)
- Draught: 12 ft 6 in (3.8 m)
- Installed power: 40,000 shp (30,000 kW); 2 × Admiralty 3-drum boilers
- Propulsion: 2 shafts; 2 steam turbines
- Speed: 36 knots (67 km/h; 41 mph)
- Range: 5,500 nmi (10,200 km; 6,300 mi) at 15 knots (28 km/h; 17 mph)
- Complement: 183
- Sensors & processing systems: ASDIC; Type 285 gunnery radar; Type 286 radar surface-search radar
- Armament: 3 × twin QF 4.7-inch (120 mm) Mk XII guns; 1 × single QF 4-inch Mk V (102 mm) AA gun; 4 × single 20 mm (0.8 in) Oerlikon AA guns; 2 × twin QF 0.5-inch (12.7 mm) Mk III machineguns; 1 × quintuple 21-inch (533 mm) torpedo tubes; 45 × depth charges, 1 × rack, 2 × throwers

HMAS Napier (G97/D13) was an N-class destroyer serving in the Royal Australian Navy (RAN) during World War II. Built during 1939 and 1940, the destroyer was commissioned into the RAN, although she was ordered and owned by the British government. During 1941, Napier operated in the Mediterranean, before being transferred to the British Eastern Fleet at the start of 1942, then to south Atlantic operations in early 1944. In 1945, Napier was assigned to the British Pacific Fleet, and spent the rest of World War II in the fight against Japan. After the war's end, the destroyer was decommissioned and returned to the British. She was sold off in 1955, and broken up in 1956.

== Design and construction ==
The N-class destroyer had a displacement of 1,760 tons at standard load, and 2,353 tons at full load. Napier was 356 feet 6 inches (108.66 m) long overall and 229 feet 6 inches (69.95 m) long between perpendiculars, had a beam of 35 feet 8 inches (10.87 m), and a maximum draught of 16 feet 4 inches (4.98 m). Propulsion was provided by Admiralty 3-drum boilers connected to Parsons geared steam turbines, which provided 40,000 shaft horsepower to the ship's two propellers. Napier was capable of reaching 36 knots (67 km/h; 41 mph). The ship's company consisted of 226 officers and sailors.

The ship's armament consisted of six 4.7-inch QF Mark XII guns in three twin mounts, a single 4-inch QF Mark V gun, a 2-pounder 4-barrel Pom Pom, four 0.5-inch machine guns, four 20 mm Oerlikon anti-aircraft guns, four .303 Lewis machine guns, two Pentad dual torpedo launcher tube sets (with 8 torpedoes carried), two depth-charge throwers and one depth-charge chute (with 45 charges carried). The 4-inch gun was removed later in Napier's career.

Napier was the first of the eight-ship N class laid down under the War Emergency Programme when construction started at the Fairfield Shipbuilding and Engineering Company shipyard in Govan, Scotland on 26 July 1939. The destroyer was launched on 22 May 1940 by the wife of one of the company directors, and was commissioned into the RAN on 28 November 1940. Although commissioned as an Australian warship, Napier remained the property of the Royal Navy. The ship was named after Scottish Admiral Sir Charles Napier, with the ship's badge taken from the family coat of arms, and cost 403,960 pounds to build.

== Operating history ==
During the ship's first weeks of operation, several sailors threatened to mutiny by refusing to leave the mess decks; this was defused when the ship's first lieutenant humorously threatened to "flog 'em out of the mess decks with ropes' ends".

In January 1941, "Napier" carried Winston Churchill to the Royal Navy base at Scapa Flow from nearby Scrabster when Churchill accompanied Lord Halifax there for his departure for the United States to serve as British Ambassador.

After completing sea trials, Napier spent the first part of her career operating as a convoy escort in the North Atlantic. Napier and sister ship Nestor were transferred to the Mediterranean, arriving in time to participate in the evacuation of Crete. Napier was then assigned to Port Said for 2 1/2 months, serving as control ship for the harbour's defence at night, while undergoing repairs and refits in the day. On completion in August, the destroyer was assigned as lead ship of the 7th Destroyer Flotilla. During the remainder of the year, Napier participated in the Tobruk Ferry Service, escorted convoys through the Mediterranean and the Red Sea, and transferred troops between Cyprus and Hafia.

At the start of 1942, Napier, Nestor, and Nizam were transferred to the British Eastern Fleet. The ships' first task was to escort the carrier HMS Indomitable to the Malaya-Java area. In June, Napier and Nestor returned to the Mediterranean for Operation Vigorous, a major convoy to support besieged Malta. Napier returned to duties with the Eastern Fleet after the unsuccessful convoy run, and in September participated in the Madagascar campaign, particularly the surrender of Majunga and the occupation of Tamatave.

The destroyer commenced patrols of the East Indian Ocean in October, which she continued until March 1943, when she joined the Atlantic anti-submarine force based in South Africa. At the start of 1944, Napier was assigned to Indian waters. Later in the year, the ship sailed to Australia for a long period of refitting at Williamstown, but returned to the Eastern Fleet in early November. During December, Napier supported operations of the 74th Indian Infantry Brigade. In January 1945, Napier took part in landings at Akyab and Ramree.

In early 1945, Napier was reassigned to the British Pacific Fleet, changing her pennant from G97 to D13. During May, the destroyer was part of the escort screen for the carrier air raids on Sakishima. Napier was present in Tokyo Bay on Victory over Japan Day (2 September 1945), when the Japanese Instrument of Surrender was signed. After supporting the occupation landings, the destroyer sailed to Sydney.

Napier earned six battle honours for her wartime service: "Crete 1941", "Libya 1941", "Indian Ocean 1942–44", "Burma 1944–45", "Pacific 1945", and "Okinawa 1945".

== Decommissioning and fate ==
The Australian ship's company left on 25 October 1945, and Napier was returned to the RN. The ship was not recommissioned, and was sold to Thos. W. Ward for scrap in 1955. She arrived at Briton Ferry in January 1956 for breaking.
