= HNLMS Van Galen (G84) =

British WWII-era N-class destroyer transferred to the Royal Netherlands Navy

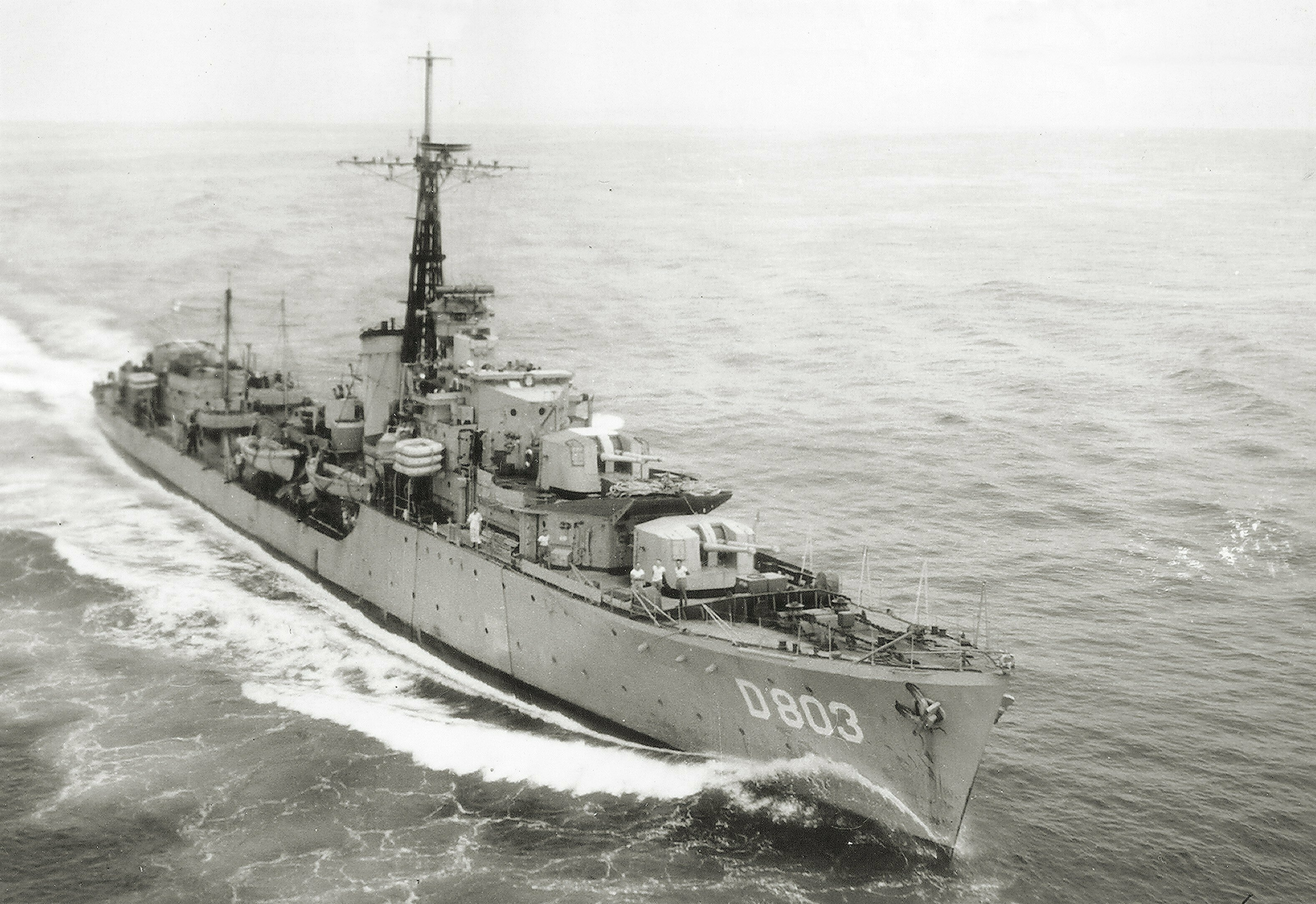
- Van Galen, 1950s

History

United Kingdom
- Name: Noble
- Builder: William Denny and Brothers, Dumbarton
- Laid down: 10 July 1939
- Launched: 17 April 1941
- Completed: 20 February 1942
- Identification: Pennant number: G84
- Notes: Transferred to Royal Netherlands Navy before completion

Netherlands
- Name: Van Galen
- Namesake: Johan van Galen
- Completed: 20 February 1942
- Stricken: October 1956
- Fate: Sold for scrap, 1957

General characteristics (as built)
- Class & type: N-class destroyer
- Displacement: 1,773 long tons (1,801 t) (standard); 2,384 long tons (2,422 t) (deep load)
- Length: 356 ft 6 in (108.7 m) (o/a)
- Beam: 35 ft 9 in (10.9 m)
- Draught: 12 ft 6 in (3.8 m)
- Installed power: 2 × Admiralty 3-drum boilers; 40,000 shp (30,000 kW)
- Propulsion: 2 shafts; 2 geared steam turbines
- Speed: 36 knots (67 km/h; 41 mph)
- Range: 5,500 nmi (10,200 km; 6,300 mi) at 15 knots (28 km/h; 17 mph)
- Complement: 183
- Sensors & processing systems: ASDIC; Type 285 gunnery radar; Type 286 radar surface-search radar
- Armament: 3 × twin QF 4.7-inch (120 mm) Mk XII guns; 1 × single QF 4-inch Mk V (102 mm) AA gun; 4 × single 20 mm (0.8 in) Oerlikon AA guns; 2 × twin QF 0.5-inch (12.7 mm) Mk III machineguns; 1 × quintuple 21-inch (533 mm) torpedo tubes; 45 × depth charges, 1 × rack, 2 × throwers

HNLMS Van Galen was a N-class destroyer built for the Royal Navy during the Second World War and transferred to the Royal Netherlands Navy shortly after completion. The Dutch changed the pennant numbers several times G-84 (WW II), J-3, JT-3, and D-803.

== Description ==
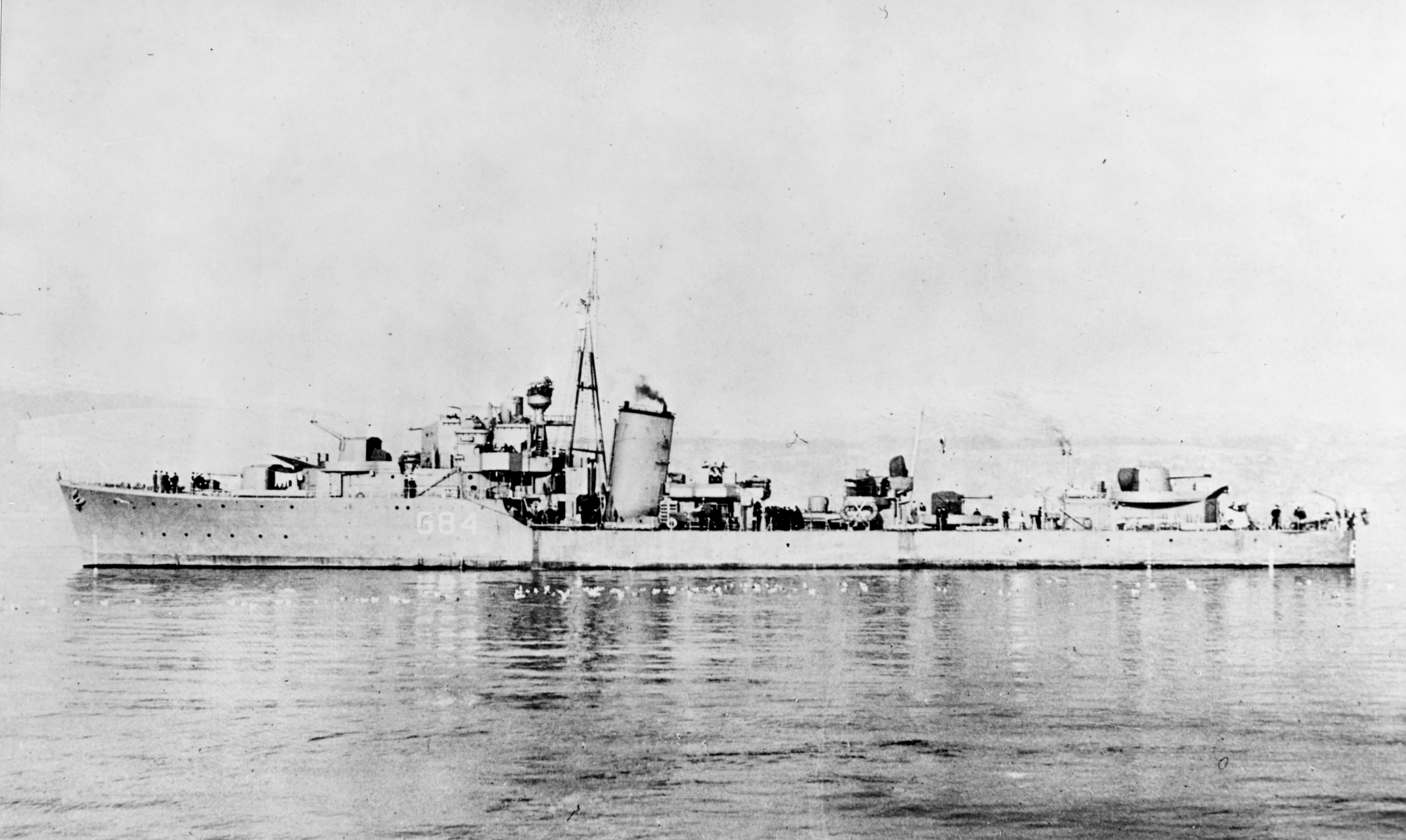
Van Galen, 1942

The N-class destroyers were repeats of the J-class, except that they incorporated the wartime modifications made to the earlier ships. They displaced 1,773 long tons (1,801 t) at standard load and 2,384 long tons (2,422 t) at deep load. The ships had an overall length of 339 feet 6 inches (103.5 m), a beam of 35 feet 9 inches (10.9 m) and a deep draught of 12 feet 6 inches (3.8 m). They were powered by Parsons geared steam turbines, each driving one propeller shaft, using steam provided by two Admiralty three-drum boilers. The turbines developed a total of 40,000 shaft horsepower (30,000 kW) and gave a maximum speed of 36 knots (67 km/h; 41 mph). The ships carried enough fuel oil to give them a range of 5,500 nautical miles (10,200 km; 6,300 mi) at 15 knots (28 km/h; 17 mph). Their complement was 183 officers and ratings.

The main armament of the N-class ships were six 4.7-inch (120 mm) Mark XII guns in three twin-gun mounts, two superfiring in front of the bridge and one aft of the superstructure. The rear torpedo tube mount was replaced by a single QF 4-inch (102 mm) Mk V anti-aircraft gun. Their light anti-aircraft suite consisted of one quadruple mount for 2-pounder 40 mm (1.6 in) guns, four single 20-millimeter (0.8 in) Oerlikon guns and two twin mounts for Vickers 0.5 in (12.7 mm) anti-aircraft machineguns. The N-class ships were fitted with one above-water quintuple mount for 21-inch (533 mm) torpedoes and two depth charge throwers and one rack for 45 depth charges.

== Construction and career ==
Van Galen was built as the British destroyer HMS Noble (G84), but was commissioned into the Royal Netherlands Navy shortly after completion. The ship served throughout the Second World War. On 22 September 1952, during exercise Main Bruce, Van Galen collided with British aircraft carrier HMS Eagle (R05) while obtaining fuel from the British vessel. Both ships suffered minor damage. Van Galen left the exercise and returned to the port of Den Helder.

The ship was stricken in October 1956, and scrapped in February 1957 in the Netherlands.
