= Dick Telford =

Australian sport scientist and footballer (born 1945)

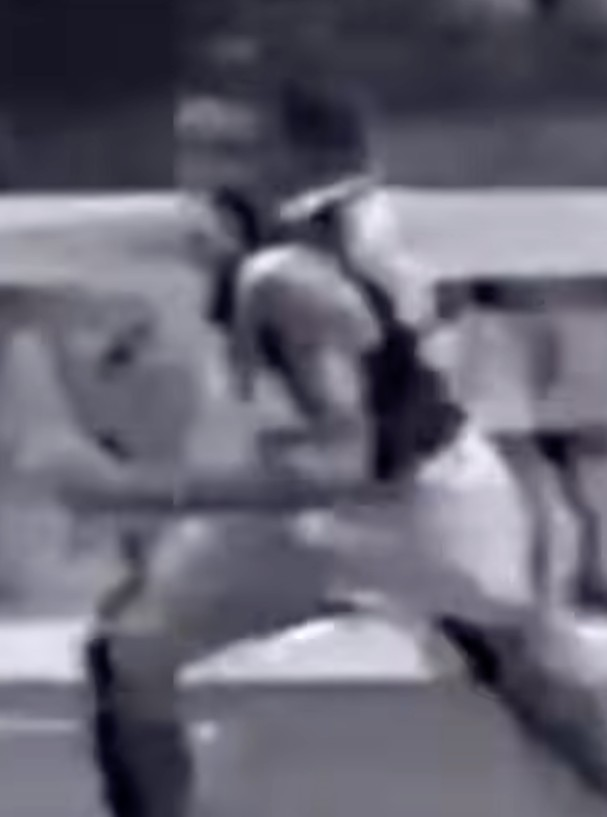
- Telford playing for Preston in 1971

Personal information
- Full name: Richard David Telford
- Born: 2 April 1945 (age 81); Melbourne, Victoria
- Original team: Northcote Park
- Height: 175 cm (5 ft 9 in)
- Weight: 70 kg (154 lb)
- Position: Centreman

Playing career^{1}
Years	Club	Games (Goals)
1966	Collingwood	1 (0)
1967	Fitzroy	2 (0)
Total		3 (0)
- ^{1} Playing statistics correct to the end of 1967.

Richard David Telford AM (born 2 April 1945) is a former Australian rules footballer who played for Collingwood and Fitzroy in the Victorian Football League (VFL) during the 1960s, although he mainly played reserves. He went on to become as a leading Australian sport scientist and distance running coach. He was the first sport scientist employed by the Australian Institute of Sport (AIS).

== Personal ==
He was born 2 April 1945 in Melbourne, Victoria. Telford's primary school days were at College Rural, a small Melbourne Teacher's College practising school in the grounds of the University of Melbourne. His father (also named Dick) had returned from World War 2 and was studying for a BSc at the university, hence the connection with the university primary school. He attended Northcote High School. He is married to Sue and they have two children.

== Sporting career ==
Telford never played a game of competitive football or cricket through primary school as the school was too small to field a team. This all changed when he went to Northcote High School where his football and cricket blossomed. He played his junior football with North Reservoir. He was invited to train with Fitzroy Cricket Club as a 16-year-old and at 17 he was invited to train with Collingwood Football Club. He won 3rd Best and Fairest for Collingwood Reserves team, playing on the wing, but due to the competitiveness of the team he made just one appearance in the seniors, a win over South Melbourne Football Club at Lake Oval, a debut he shared with Doug Searl. The following year, he transferred to Fitzroy Football Club and after playing well in the Reserves, he again won a place in the senior team, this time as a rover, but after two games was ruled out for the rest of the season with a badly damaged hand.

A natural centreman, Telford was never given a chance to play this position in the VFL but transferred to Preston in 1968. Coach Alan Joyce immediately recognised his ability and selected him in the centre for the senior team after seeing him play one game in the reserves. Telford won that season's J.J. Liston Trophy, Best and Fairest Player Victorian Football Association, the club Best Player Award, and Preston won the Premiership. The following year, he won the club Best Player Award and the Preston the premiership. Telford retired in 1972 after 68 VFA games, by which time he had secured two club 'best and fairest' and participated in back to back premierships, in 1968 and 1969. Telford spent the 1975 and 1976 seasons as non-playing coach of Preston after returning from Western Australia.

Through his football career, Telford played cricket, and appeared in 21 first XI district cricket matches between 1964/65 and 1968/69 for University and Fitzroy.

Telford was a world class veterans runner. He competed in the Melbourne Marathon in 1978 and recorded a time 3 hours 12 minutes, and following 5 other marathons recorded a personal best time of 2-hour 27 minutes. In 1984, he turned to the track and he won his first Australian veterans M40 1500m championship in 1985. At the 1987 World Veterans Games in Melbourne he tied for third in the 1500m. He has the unusual personal achievement of recording his career personal best times in the 800m (1.58), 1500m (3.57), 5k, 10k, half marathon (1 hour 9 minutes) and marathon (2 hours 27 minutes) in his very last races in these events.

== Academic and research career ==
On leaving Northcote High School in 1962, Telford pursued his love of sport and physical education and completed a Diploma in Physical Education and Trained Secondary Teachers' Certificate at University of Melbourne to begin a teaching career at Glenroy Technical School in 1966. He soon found there was more to learn and following advice from good friend Ross Price, (North Melbourne footballer and University of Melbourne 1st grade cricketer) Telford went on to complete a BSc (Hons). Not wishing to leave Australia as did some of his colleagues, Telford pursued postgraduate work at his "home away from home" University of Melbourne (he went to Primary School there as well) and in 1976 completed a Master of Science at the University of Melbourne, with his thesis titled The maximal aerobic power and related studies in sedentary subjects and endurance athletes from Melbourne. In 1979, his PhD thesis titled Cardiorespiratory properties of trained and untrained subjects and specificity of athletic performance evaluation was completed at the University of Melbourne. He then worked as a lecturer in the Physical Education Department at Preston Institute of Technology.

After leaving the AIS in 2005, Telford returned to his research passion. He took up positions as Research Director of the Lifestyle of Our Kids (LOOK) Project, Commonwealth Institute, Adjunct Professor at the Australian National University College of Medicine, Biology and Environment and Research Fellow at the Canberra Hospital's Clinical Trials Unit. The four-year LOOK study of 734 otherwise healthy Australian children in the general community, aged between 8 and 12 years, has found that the main difference between lean and overweight children was that lean children were more physically active. The study provides important evidence in the childhood obesity debate.

== Sport scientist career ==
Whilst studying for his PhD, Telford was invited to look after the Victorian Sheffield Shield Cricket team as Manager and Coaching Coordinator. During his time with the team, it won back to back Sheffield Shield's in 1978/9 and 1979/80 as well as the One-day competition.

In 1980, Telford was the first sport scientist appointed to the newly established Australian Institute of Sport. He was appointed to the position of Co-ordinator of Sports Sciences and Physiologist. Telford was required to develop the philosophy, select major positions in sports medicine, physical therapy, psychology and biomechanics areas, develop sports science and medicine services and develop a plan for future facilities. John Bloomfield stated Telford was an excellent choice to establish sports science at the AIS as he was a talented exercise physiologist as well as competent distance running coach. Telford appointed Robert De Castella, as a sport science technician and he later went on to become a world class marathon runner. Telford was appointed team physiologist for the Australian swim team at the 1984 Los Angeles Olympics. Telford expanded physiological services to include nutrition services and as the sport science medicine staffing expanded he was appointed Head of Applied Physiology and Nutrition. Telford played a major role in raising the profile of the AIS and sports science through the development and advertising promotion of two products. In 1986, Kellogg's launched the Sustain breakfast cereal, Telford played a major role and was prominent in television advertisements. In 1988, Telford and AIS nutritionist Vicki Deakin worked with Goodman Fielders to develop the Gold Medal bread. During his time in charge of AIS Physiology, the AIS undertook major research into nutrition, heat, altitude and talent identification. His philosophy was " I always considered the coaches to be my boss. You were trying to help the coach get the best out on an athlete". He left as Head of AIS Physiology to take up a distance running coaching role with AIS Track and Field. He was replaced by Allan Hahn.

== Distance running coach ==
Telford became involved in distance running coaching in the 1980s. He was the physiologist to the World Champion marathoner Rob de Castella and coached Lisa Martin (Ondieki), to a silver medal in the women's marathon at the 1988 Seoul Olympics. Martin is currently Australia's only Olympic marathon medallist. He became a full-time distance running coach in 1994 when appointed to run the AIS distance running program. He continued in this role until 2005 when the AIS and Athletics Australia decided to discontinue the program. Telford has continued to coach privately. Leading Australian distance runners coached by Telford include – Commonwealth Games gold medalists Andrew Lloyd and Kate Anderson, as well as Carolyn Schuwalow, Susan Hobson, Benita Willis, Sisay Bezabeh, Martin Dent, Nicky Carroll, Mizan Mehari and Lisa Corrigan. At the 2012 London Olympics two of his athletes Lisa Weightman and Michael Shelley were selected. Both athletes won medals at the 2010 Commonwealth Games. He coached Shelley to win the 2014 Commonwealth Games Men's Marathon gold medal.

He was distance running coach on the Australian teams at the 1992 Barcelona and 1996 Atlanta Olympics.

== Recognition ==
- 1988 – Foundation Fellow of Sports Medicine Australia
- 1990 – Fellow of American College of Sports Medicine
- 1992 – Member of the Order of Australia for service to sport and sport science.
- 2008 – State Finalist (ACT) Senior Australian of the Year
- 2014 – Sport Australia Hall of Fame General Member
- 2014 – Athletics Australia Australian Sports Commission Coach of the Year
- 2017 – ACT Senior Australian of the Year
- 2018 – ACT Sport Hall of Fame Associate Member
- 2018 – AIS Sport Performance Awards - Service to Sport Award

== Bibliography ==
- Running : through the looking glass / Dick Telford, Griffith, A.C.T. Barrallier Books Pty Ltd, 2015
- Take care of yourself : your personal guide to self-care and preventing illness, Richard D. Telford .. {et.al.}, Sydney : Addison-Wesley, 1993
