= NSIC =

NSIC may refer to:

- National Scholastic Indoor Championships, a high school indoor track championship meet in the United States
- National Small Industries Corporation, a Government of India enterprise
  - Okhla NSIC metro station, Delhi, India
- National Space Intelligence Center, a United States Space Force unit
- National Spinal Injuries Centre, at Stoke Mandeville Hospital in Buckinghamshire, England
- National Sport Information Centre, Australia
- Northern Sun Intercollegiate Conference, an NCAA Division II conference in the Midwestern United States
