= Gathercole =

Gathercole is an English surname which originated, in the Early Medieval period, as a nickname for an old man who "gathered cold", i.e. became weak and unwell.

Notable persons with the surname include:

- Ben Gathercole (born 1965), Australian triathlon coach
- Cory Gathercole (born 1986), Australian motorcycle speedway rider
- Harry Gathercole (1887–1953), Australian footballer
- John Gathercole (1937–2010), Archdeacon of Dudley
- Simon J. Gathercole, British New Testament scholar
- Susan Gathercole, British psychologist
- Terry Gathercole (1935–2001), Australian swimmer
