= Peter Fricker =

Peter Fricker may refer to:

- Peter Racine Fricker (1920–1990), English composer
- Peter Fricker (sports physician) (born 1950), Australian sports physician and administrator
