= Allan Hahn =

Australian sports scientist

Allan Geoffrey Hahn OAM (born 1951) is an Australian sports scientist. Between 1984 and 2011, he made a significant contribution to the Australian Institute of Sport (AIS) in the areas of sports physiology and technology. In September 2011, he was appointed Emeritus Professor at the AIS.

== Personal ==
Hahn was born in Melbourne in 1951. He grew up in Melbourne and played a variety of sports including Australian rules football, boxing, cycling and cross country running.

== Academic career ==
In 1973, Hahn obtained a Diploma of Physical Education from the University of Melbourne and in the following year he completed a Higher Diploma of Teaching (Secondary) at the Melbourne College of Education. In 1976, he moved to Perth where in 1977, he completed a Bachelor of Physical Education with First Class Honours at the University of Western Australia. His Honours thesis titled The relative merits of two different exercise programs in the treatment of hypertension. In 1979, he took up a full-time position as a tutor at the University of Western Australia while also studying toward a PhD. In 1981, while still engaged in PhD studies, he took up a lecturing position at the University of Canberra. In 1984, he was appointed senior physiologist at the AIS Physiology Department. In 1986, he was awarded a PhD from the University of Western Australia for a thesis titled Investigation of some possible mechanisms in Investigation of some possible mechanisms in exercise-induced asthma.

In 1998, he was appointed as adjunct professor at the University of the Sunshine Coast. In 2011, he was appointed to part-time positions as Research Leader for Coaching at the Queensland Academy of Sport, Professorial Fellow at the University of Canberra and Professor of Sport Partnerships, Institute of Sport, Exercise and Living, Victoria University. In 2012, he became an honorary adjunct professor at Griffith University.

== Australian Institute of Sport ==
In 1984, Hahn joined the AIS Physiology Department which was being managed by Dr Dick Telford. In 1987, he commenced a major research project to assist Australian rowing with talent identification. This research program has been acknowledged as the start of systematic talent identification in Australia. The research program resulted in Megan Still, identified through the program, combining with Kate Slatter to win the Women's Coxless Pair at the 1996 Atlanta Olympics. The boat they rowed in was called Allan Hahn in recognition of his work. In early 1990s, the AIS started research into the use of altitude training and Hahn has authored or co-authored over 70 papers in this area of research. In 1994, he replaced Dick Telford as the Head of AIS Physiology. In the lead up to the 1996 Atlanta Olympics, he and other AIS physiology staff undertook extensive research into maximising sports performance in hot humid environments. This research resulted in Australian athletes using cooling vests at the Games.

In 1998, AIS Physiology under his direction, commenced a major research project with the Australian Sports Drug Testing Laboratory to trial a screening test for the banned drug erythropoietin (EPO). In August 2000, the International Olympic Committee recommended that the blood test developed as a result of the research be used at the 2000 Sydney Olympics. The test was combined with a French urine test. In 2000, Hahn recognised the increasing importance that technology was playing in sport science and he played a major role in the AIS being accepted as a major partner in the CRC for Micro technology. This research program resulted in miniaturising athlete monitoring devices. In 2001, he was responsible for establishing a sports based PhD program at the AIS that aimed at increasing the number of applied Australian sports scientists. In 2005, he was appointed the inaugural head of the AIS Applied Research Centre and Professor Chris Gore replaced him as Head of AIS Physiology. In 2006, he played a major role in the AIS developing a research partnership with CSIRO where both organisations shared expertise and technologies. An outcome of this research partnership was Hahn's involvement in developing technology to improve the accuracy of boxing scoring. The technology included a vests, head guards and gloves with built-in sensors to record and send data, via wireless transmission, when an impact occurs. In September 2011, whilst holding the position of Chief Scientist, Hahn resigned and took up an appointment as an emeritus professor.

Hahn subsequently has taken up part-time positions at the Queensland Academy of Sport, University of Canberra and Victoria University. He provides sports science advice to the Collingwood Football Club when it won the 2010 Australian Football League Premiership, his support was publicly acknowledged by David Buttifant, the club's sport science director.

Hahn "has been described as the Grandfather of Australian Sports Science and a true visionary. A learned, friendly and humble man, he will be greatly missed. In his departure however, he leaves a legacy of innovation and a challenge for those who follow to keep the AIS at the forefront of technological advances in sport."

== Recognition ==
- 2000 – Australian Sports Medal for services to sports science and medicine
- 2002 – Order of Australia (OAM) for service to sports science research, particularly in the area of rowing.
- 2003 – Bulletin Magazine Smart 100 Award – Winner Sport Category
- 2013 – Doctor of Applied Science Honoris Causa Royal Melbourne Institute of Technology

== External sources ==
- Allan Hahn interviewed by Rosalind Hearder for the National Library of Australia Sport Oral History Project, 2008
