= Matt Favier =

Australian sport administrator

Personal information
- Born: 16 October 1965 (age 61)

Sport
- Sport: Track and field

Matthew "Matt" Favier (born 16 October 1965) is an Australian sport administrator. He was appointed the eighth Director of the Australian Institute of Sport in December 2011.

== Education ==
Favier was educated at Tully State High School in Queensland, has a Bachelor of Education in Physical Education from the University of Canberra and an MBA from the University of Technology, Sydney.

== Athletics career ==
He held an Australian Institute of Sport track and field scholarship from 1983 to 1986. Favier, an 800m runner, was coached by Pat Clohessy. He won the Junior Men's 800m title at the 1983/84 Australian Athletics Championships. He was third in Senior Men's 800m at the 1987/88 and 1989/90 Australian Championships. He competed in the Men's 800m at the 1985 Summer Universiade in Kobe, Japan.

== Sport Administrator ==
From 1988 to 1993, Favier was a physical education teacher in the Australian Capital Territory school system.

In 1994, Favier moved into high performance sport administration and has since worked for a range of Australian and British sports organizations: Athletics Australia (1994–1996), Western Sydney Academy of Sport (1997–1998), Soccer Australia (1998–1999), Australian Paralympic Committee (1999–2000), Queensland Academy of Sport (2000–2003), UK Athletics (2003–2009), UK Sport (2009–2012) and Australian Institute of Sport (2012 -).

He has been an athletics coach, and while in the United Kingdom coached British sprinter Harry Aikines-Aryeetey, a former youth world champion.

His appointment as Director of the Australian Institute of Sport worried some British sports officials, as it could have impacted Great Britain's medal tally at the 2012 London Olympics. He is the second AIS scholarship holder to be appointed Director, the first being Robert De Castella (1990–1995).

In June 2017, Favier resigned as AIS Director after being appointed chief executive officer at Hockey Australia.

He was the inaugural inductee to the University of Canberra Sport Walk of Fame in 2022.

== Personal life ==
He was married to Jane Flemming, a former AIS scholarship holder and dual Commonwealth Games athletics gold medallist.
