= Ben Gathercole =

Australian coach (b. 1965, d. 2001)

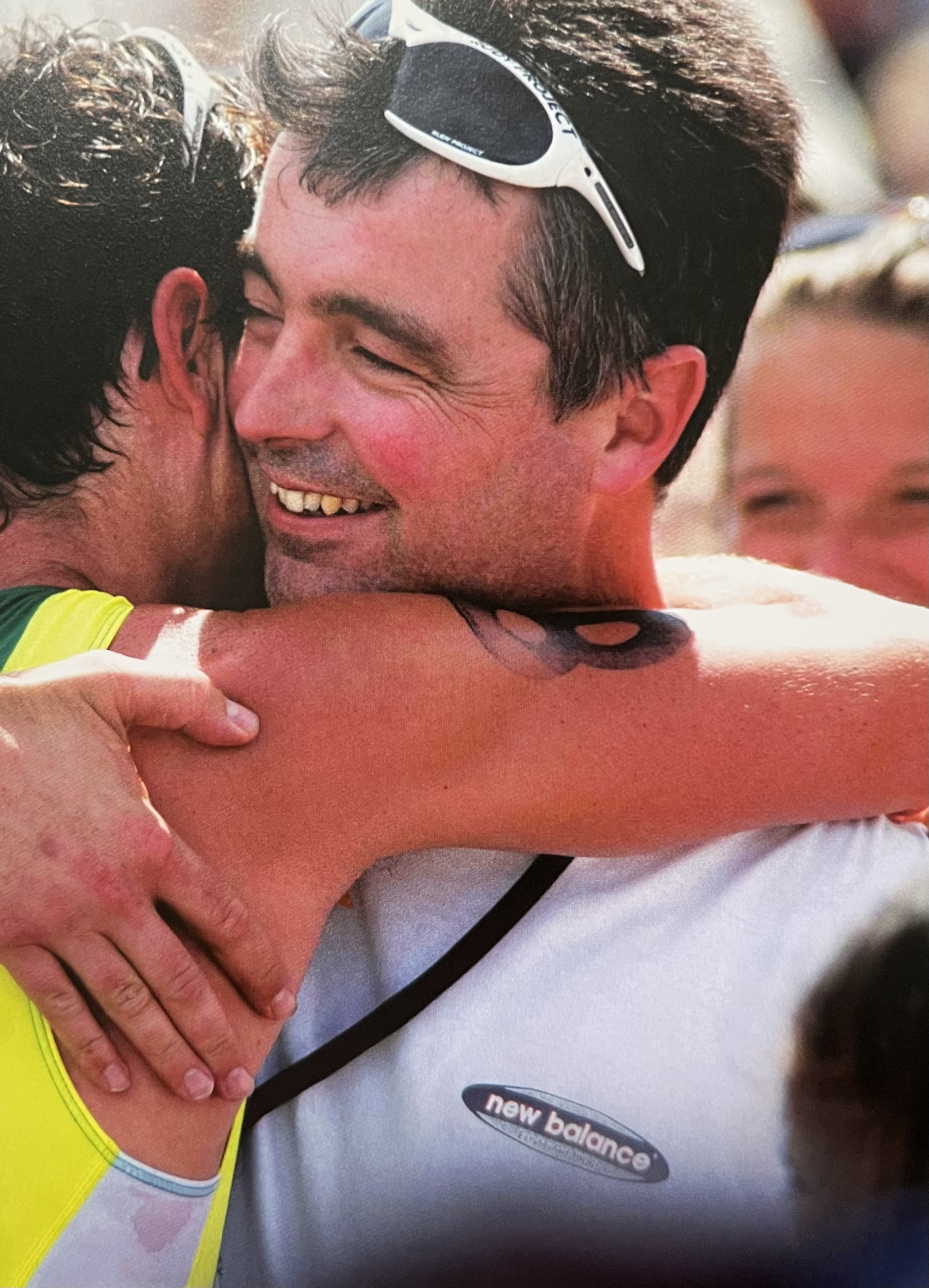
Coach Ben Gathercole congratulates Simon Thompson at the finish line after their victory in the first Olympic selection race for Athens 2004 in Coffs Harbour.

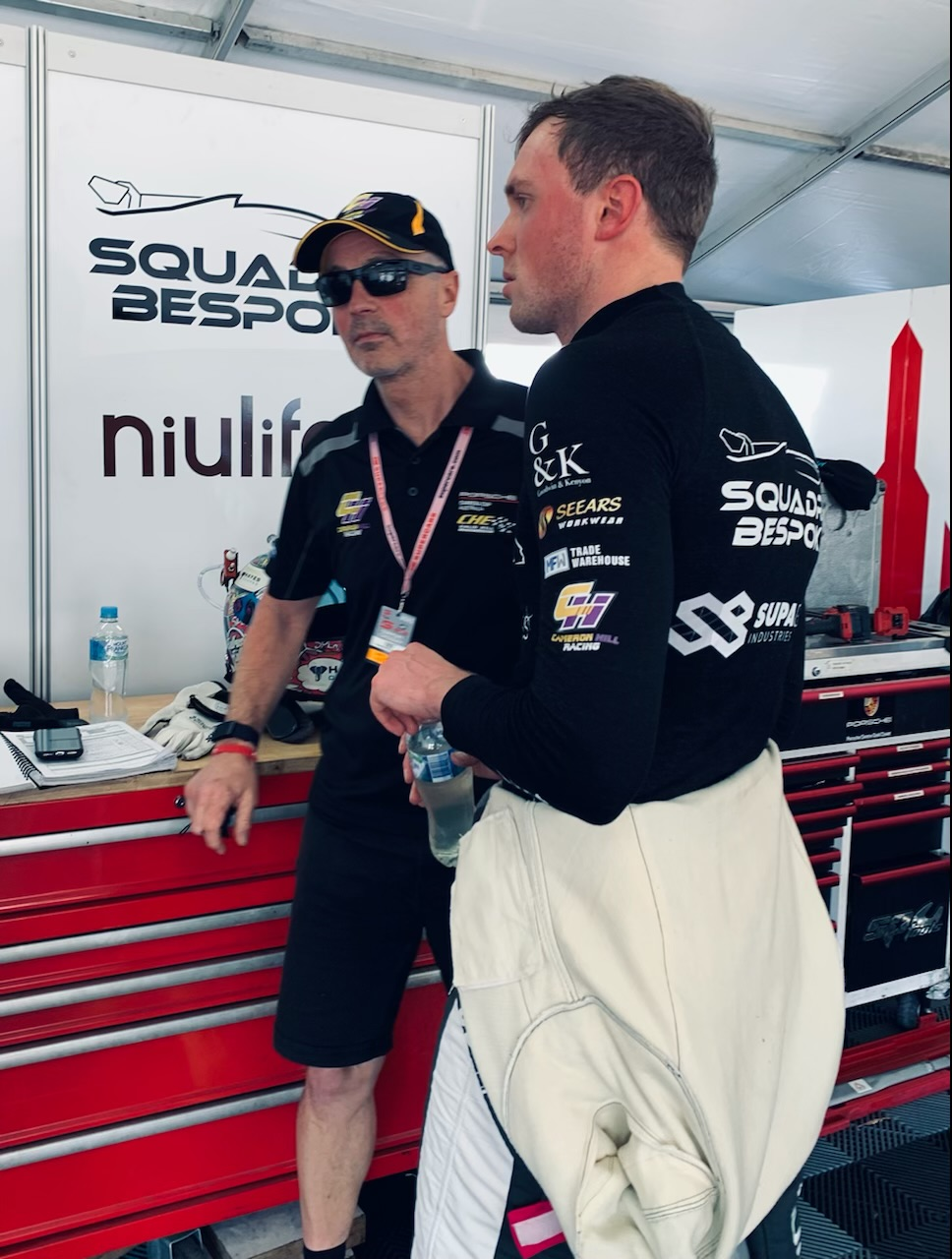
Performance Manager Ben Gathercole and Series Leader Cameron Hill talk tactics during a break in the Townsville round of the 2021 Porsche Carrera Cup.

Ben Gathercole (born 1965) is an Australian high-performance triathlon coach, sports manager and author.

== Family and education ==
Gathercole was born in Sydney, New South Wales in 1965 and spent his early years in Texas, U.S. where his father had been invited to set up a swimming team by the City of Midland. The family returned to Killarney Heights, a suburb of Sydney, in 1973. Gathercole attended Killarney Heights Public School and Killarney Heights High School, graduating Year 12 in 1984. He returned to the U.S. after winning a swimming scholarship to study at Indian River State College, Florida and later transferred to Florida State University, where he studied to be a physical education teacher. Gathercole returned to Australia in 1988 to train at the AIS in the lead up to the Seoul Olympics.

Gathercole is the son of Olympic swimming medallist, coach and administrator Terry Gathercole AM(1935–2001) and Carol Gathercole (nee Fraser, 1938–) a swim teacher and one of only two women inducted into the Australian Swimming Hall of Fame. Gathercole has an older sister, Gai, and a younger brother, Tim. He is married to Caroline (nee Menzel, married 2001) and they have a daughter, Georgia born in 2004. They live in Canberra, Australia.

== Athletic career ==
A long-distance specialist, Gathercole's events included 400 metres individual medley (IM), 800 metres freestyle and 1500 metres freestyle.

With both parents working in swimming and owning their own pool at Killarney Heights in Sydney's northern suburbs, all three Gathercole children swam for the Killarney Swimming Club and later the WIN Swim Club. Gathercole was an age group club champion and record-holder, and qualified for Metropolitan, State and National titles, but fell short in his attempt to qualify for the 1982 Brisbane Commonwealth Games. In February 1984 while studying for his Higher School Certificate (HSC) Gathercole competed in the 200m and 400m IM in the Australian titles and Los Angeles Olympics selection events at Brisbane's Chandler Aquatic Centre.

Gathercole was awarded a swimming scholarship to Indian River State College in Florida, U.S. commencing in 1985. He was part of the championship-winning team at the National Junior College Athletic Association (NJCAA) titles that year, where he won the 400 IM and swam in the winning medley relay team. Gathercole’s performances in the 1650 yards freestyle and 400 IM earned him a place on the men's All-American Swimming and Diving Team of the NJCAA for 1985. Indian River again took out the NJCAA championship in 1986, helped by Gathercole’s wins in the 1650 yards freestyle and 400 IM.

After returning from the U.S. at the end of 1987, Gathercole swam under legendary coach Bill Sweetenham at the Australian Institute of Sport in the lead up to the trials for the 1988 Olympic Games, but missed out on qualifying.

Gathercole took up triathlon as a challenge from a mate, entering his first event in Forster, New South Wales in 1991 – the Ironman Triathlon (4.8 km swim/180 km cycle/42.2 km run) – which he completed in 10 hours 55 minutes and 40 seconds. The following year he completed the event in 11:24:54, and in 1994 he finished in 11:10:03.

== Coaching ==
Gathercole retired from competitive swimming in 1989 and moved to Sydney, having been recruited by Knox Grammar School to join the staff as a physical education teacher, swimming coach and boarding tutor. He returned to Canberra two years later to run the family business, an indoor pool and fitness centre in Woden in Canberra’s south. After entering his first triathlon, he recognised the lack of coaches in the sport and started coaching, building up a stable of athletes which would become the Tridents Triathlon Club. Over two decades Gathercole coached and managed Tridents to become one of the top clubs in Australia with its high-performance framework, structures and methodologies. The club became nationally renowned for its support of fellow competitors and the 'yellow army' was a regular sight at events across the country, taking team spirit to a whole new plane and setting the benchmark for club organisation and achievement. This culminated in Tridents becoming Australian Club Champions in 2002 and winning numerous Australian Capital Territory Club Championships.

Gathercole received his formal triathlon coaching accreditation in 1993, and completed the highest level - High-Performance Coach - in 2002. He took time out from frontline coaching to manage the ACT Brumbies Super Rugby team (2014–2016) and run the Triathlon Australia High-Performance Program (2016–2017).

Gathercole has played a long-term role in the development of triathlon in the South Pacific, initially coaching Serena Francis (Cook Islands) to the 2002 Commonwealth Games and later running training camps for the International Triathlon Union.

Gathercole followed in his father’s footsteps to become an Olympic and Commonwealth Games coach after his athlete Simon Thompson qualified for the Australian team for the 2004 Athens Olympics (placing 10th after falling twice on the cycle leg) and the 2006 Melbourne Commonwealth Games, where he finished 11th having agreed to play a team role for Australia to support the eventual Gold and Bronze Medal winners Brad Kahlefeldt and Peter Robertson. Gathercole's stable of athletes over more than two decades has also included Michelle Dillon (who raced for Great Britain in the Sydney 2000 Olympics and Athens 2004 Olympics), Michelle Wu (Australia) World Champion in 2008 and Oceania Duathlon Champion in 2007, Kat Baker (Australia) World Champion in 2005 and 2006, World Champion (2015, 2016) and 2018 Commonwealth Games silver medallist Bec Wiasak (Australia), five-time Australian Capital Territory Triathlete of the Year (1996-2001) Raeleigh Tennant, two-time ACT Triathlete of the Year (1993, 1995) Alison Coote, and American professional endurance athlete, motivational speaker and adventurer Colin O'Brady.

After leaving his role at Triathlon Australia, Gathercole set up a private coaching business, BG Performance Coaching Cooperative. In 2018, he was appointed as Spirit University Director and has delivered online coaching modules for the University. In 2020, he was appointed Head of Speakers for the World Endurance Coach Business Summit – Coach 2020 Vision.

== Sports management ==
In 2014, Gathercole stepped away from triathlon and joined the ACT Brumbies Super Rugby franchise as team director after an invitation from head coach Stephen Larkham to be in charge of the team’s off-field operations. Larkham engaged Gathercole because he was looking for fresh eyes from a performance background rather than just rugby. Hiring Gathercole was part of Larkham’s strategy to drive organisational change within the franchise which had been suffering dwindling crowds and public criticism. Gathercole was involved in all aspects of the Super Rugby side’s operational activities including junior development from 2014 until the end of the 2016 season. His off-field contribution to the team’s performance culminated in the Brumbies being named 2016 Super Rugby Team of the Year at the annual John Eales Medal Awards.

In late 2016, Gathercole was offered the country’s leading triathlon coaching position as Triathlon Australia High-Performance Director. In announcing his appointment to the leadership role, Triathlon Australia CEO Miles Stewart said the organisation had been looking for someone with a mixture of both triathlon experience and external experience and Gathercole had been successful amongst a strong field of candidates. During his stewardship of the high-performance program, Gathercole was responsible for a ground-breaking restructure which attracted world-class coaches including Olympic and Commonwealth Games coaches Darren Smith and Jamie Turner, who coached 2016 Rio Olympics Gold medallist Gwen Jorgensen. Gathercole continued as High-Performance Director until late 2017 when he resigned to focus on his Type 1 Diabetes which he had been managing for 20 years.

In 2019, Gathercole joined the team of Porsche PAYCE Carrera Cup racing driver Cameron Hill as performance manager. After his rookie season Hill had recognised the importance of having a dedicated team manager, and the value of appointing someone from outside the motorsport industry, seeing Gathercole’s vast experience maximising the performance of both individual athletes and larger teams relevant to motor racing as both an individual and a team sport. Gathercole manages the logistics of the team enabling Hill to focus on preparing and driving the car. Hill credits the upward trajectory in his results during the 2019 season, including his first victory and other podium finishes to Gathercole’s experience and expertise at optimising the human performance of everyone on the team.

== Writing and broadcasting ==
Gathercole’s first book Better Than Winning – the story of Gathercole’s personal and public journey taking his athlete Simon Thompson to the 2004 Athens Olympics – was published in 2012 and became a best-seller. After meeting Gathercole, who was presenting at a Menslink Silence is Deadly forum, CEO Martin Fisk reviewed the book for Play magazine quoting Gathercole's lesson that 'core values like honesty, passion, drive, commitment, sense of fair play, loyalty, mateship, pride in yourself, your team and your country can and need to be displayed daily and from the heart'.

In 2018, with then Triathlon ACT Executive Director Craig Johns, Gathercole set up the Active CEO podcast series including interviews with business leaders on how they stay fit and focussed.

== Awards ==
- Australian Triathlon Coach of the year 2005
- Triathlon ACT Coach of the Year 1996/97, 1997/98, 1998/99, 2000/01
- Triathlon ACT Special Achievement in Coaching Award 2001/02, 2003/04, 2004/05, 2006/07, 2008/09
- Triathlon ACT Life Membership 2012
- ACT Sport Hall of Fame Associate Member 2021
