= Killarney Heights High School =

Coordinates: 33°46′18″S 151°12′55″E

Location
- Starkey Street; Northern Beaches; Killarney Heights, New South Wales, 2087; Australia

Information
- Type: Public Coeducational Secondary Day School
- Motto: Latin: Sylle Aefter Faerelde (To each according to his/her conduct)
- Established: 1967
- Educational authority: New South Wales Department of Education
- Principal: Hayley Emmerton
- Years offered: 7–12
- Enrolment: 996 (2023)
- Colours: Blue, white and Yellow
- Feeder schools: Killarney Heights Public School and Forestville Public School
- Website: https://killarney-h.schools.nsw.gov.au/

Killarney Heights High School is a coeducational, comprehensive high school located on Starkey Street in Killarney Heights, a northern suburb of Sydney, in the Northern Beaches, Australia.

Academically, Killarney Heights High School has performed better in 2018 and 2019 than previously, ranking in the top 100 schools both years, for the first time. However, due to rising issues after COVID, the school (along with most other schools in NSW) took a massive hit to results and student enrolment.

The school pushes a heavy focus on teacher-parent communication, inclusivity, diversity, and student/teacher wellbeing.

The school has a large Band Program, which features over 8 ensembles, ranging from Jazz, to Symphonic, to Strings. The band program makes tri-yearly trips overseas on an international tour. In 2023, this was to Tasmania.

The school also has a high level of sporting capability, with their sports teams coming first in multiple competitions.

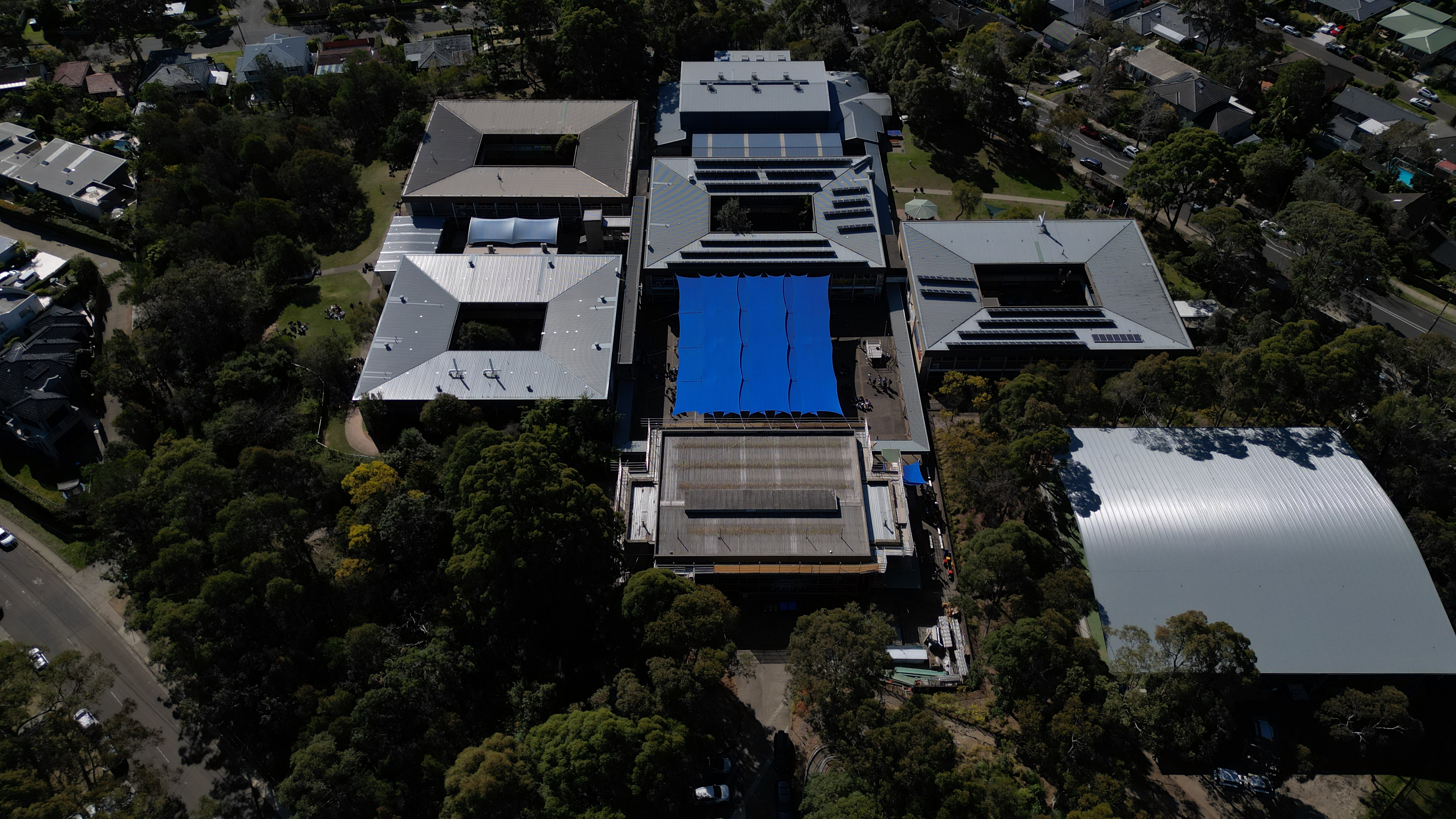
Top down view of the school

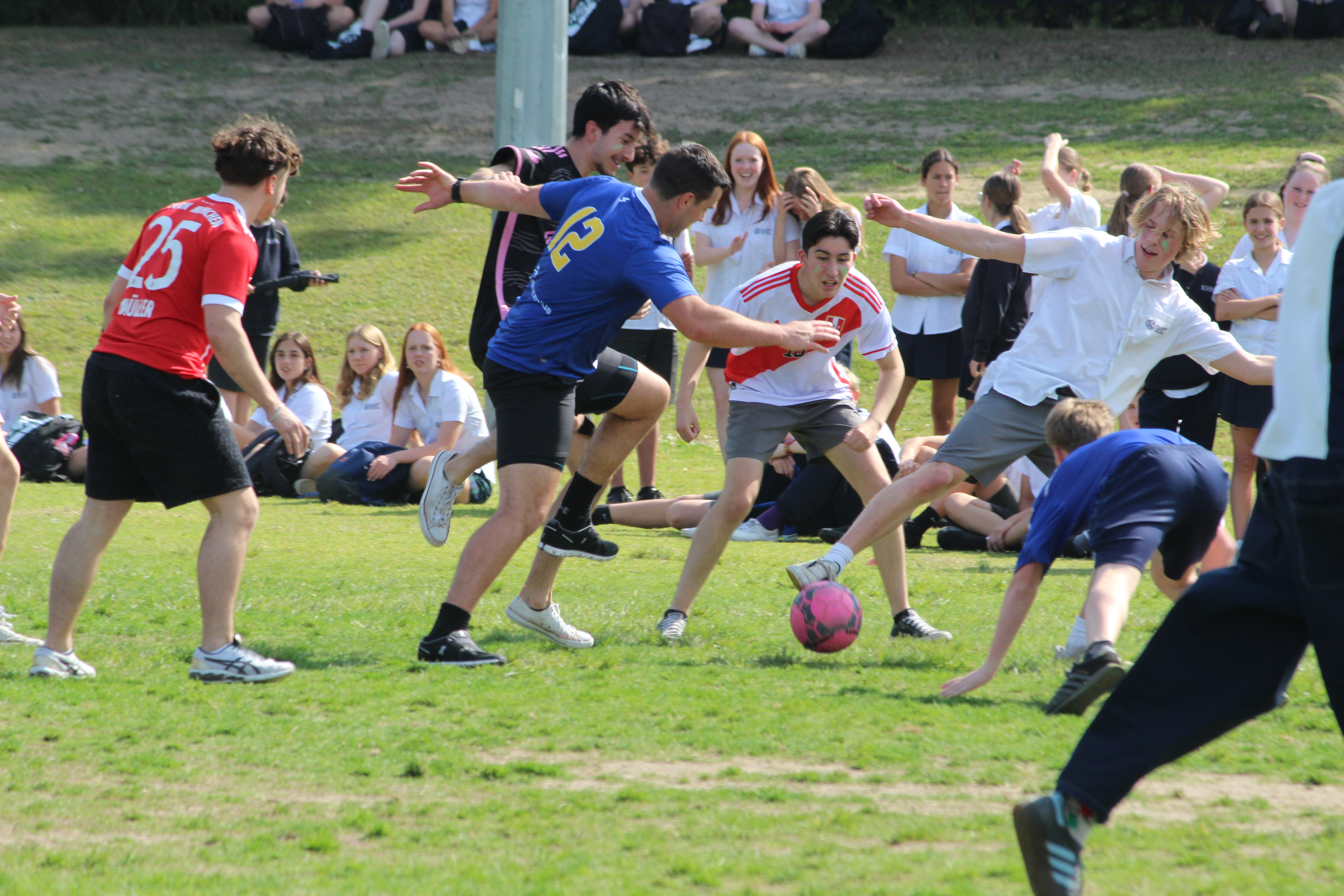
Year 12 versus Teachers Sports Game

== History ==
The school was established in January 1967 to serve the new suburb of Killarney Heights which was built in the early 1960s. Some construction was still ongoing when the school opened and by the end of the year there were eight classrooms over four buildings. There were extensions to the school in 1968 and 1969. When the school opened there were 137 students but this rose rapidly with 998 students being enrolled by 1971 and 1281 by 1972.

A gala event was held in 2017 to mark the 50th anniversary of the school.

== Motto ==
The motto comes from an abbreviated quote from the writings of a late Old English abbot and Aelfric of Eynsham "a prolific writer of religious literature, including translations from the Bible, saints' lives and homilies. It reads as follows: Ic afandie manna heotan: & heora lendena. & aelcum sylle aefter his faerelde.& aefter his agenre afundennysse. This means: 'to each I will give according to his {life} journey and according to his own invention [or discovery]'".

The school motto "sylle aefter faerelde" was translated as "To each according to his/her conduct" (translated as his/her due to the school being coeducational). The three words on their own can also be interpreted as "sylle" – foundation, "aefter" – after, "faerelde " — journey.

== Academic results ==
HSC Results
Year	Rank	Success Rate	Total Credits	Exams Sat	Year 12 Students
2023	136	13.3%	78	586	117
2022	128	13.2%	81	612	114
2021	149	12.8%	84	657	127
2020	87	18.14%	115	634	124
2019	79	19%	117	615	113
2018	88	16.3%	105	644	123
2017	195	10%	74	739	145
2016	147	11.1%	70	632	125
2015	195	8.5%	65	764	145
2014	167	8.9%	-	-	135
2013	186	8.1%	65	803	148

Subject Specific HSC Results*
Subject	School 2023	State Average 2023	School Average 2021–2023
Ancient History	81.9	68.7	80.7
Biology	80.5	71.8	76.4
Business Studies	77.9	70.9	76.7
Chemistry	76.8	73.7	72.2
Community and Family Studies	87.3	72.7	80.0
Economics	72.8	75.7	75.5
Engineering Studies	75.9	73.9	75.7
English Advanced	89.6	81.2	88.8
English EAL/D	78.8	67.8	78.0
English Standard	78.7	68.5	78.5
Food Technology	79.5	70.8	78.9
Geography	77.5	72.5	77.5
Industrial Technology	80.4	69.1	80.1
Investigating Science	82.4	73.4	83.5
Legal Studies	83.7	72.9	84.9
Mathematics Advanced	79.0	77.0	77.5
Mathematics Extension 1	73.0	78.7	73.6
Mathematics Standard 2	77.3	68.7	74.1
Modern History	78.6	69.0	79.9
Personal Development, Health and Physical Education Now known as: Health and Movement Science	80.3	71.0	75.7
Physics	78.7	74.4	75.3
Society and Culture	87.1	76.3	86.2
Visual Arts	84.0	79.8	84.8

*Where there are fewer than 10 students in a course or subject, summary statistics or graphical representation of student performance is not available.

== Notable alumni and staff ==
- Ben Gathercole, triathlon coach
- Michael Hutchence, musician and lead singer of INXS
- Julie Sutton, former mayor of Warringah
- Judge Philip Hogan DCJ, judge of the District Court of New South Wales

== See also ==
- List of Government schools in New South Wales
- Forestville, New South Wales
