= John Marshall (athlete) =

American middle-distance runner

Personal information
- Nationality: American
- Born: November 5, 1963 (age 62) Plainfield, New Jersey, U.S.

Sport
- Sport: Track
- Event: 800 meters
- College team: Villanova

Achievements and titles
- Personal bests: 800 meters: 1:43.92; 1500 meters: 3:44.8; Mile: 4:01.83
Medal record
Representing United States
Summer Universiade
| Bronze medal – third place | 1985 Kobe | 800 metres |

John Henry Marshall (born November 5, 1963) is an American former middle-distance track athlete who specialized in the 800 meters. He competed for the United States at the 1984 Summer Olympics. He was married to former 800-meter runner Debbie Grant, with whom he has a son, Myles Marshall, who is also an 800-meter runner and competed for the US junior team in 2014.

== Running career ==
=== High school ===
Marshall attended and ran with Plainfield High School in his hometown of Plainfield, New Jersey, where he graduated in 1981. He set the New Jersey High School state record in the boy's 800 meters at 1:49.5 in 1981. He also was a member of Plainfield's 4x400-meter relay team at the 1981 Penn Relays, where he ran his 400-meter split in 46.7 seconds.

=== Collegiate ===
Marshall attended and ran with Villanova University until he graduated in 1985. His collegiate highlights include winning the men's 880-yard race at the 1983 NCAA DI Indoor T&F Championships. While in school, Marshall competed at the 1984 Summer Olympics, where he ran the men's 800 meters.
