= Tim Gavel =

Australian sports broadcaster and journalist

Timothy Tempest Gavel OAM is an Australian sports broadcaster and journalist. He is best known for his association with the Australian Broadcasting Corporation in Canberra where he commentated on Canberra Raiders, ACT Brumbies and other major sporting events.

== Career ==
Before taking up a sports journalist role with the ABC in Canberra in December 1988, he worked as a disc jockey and journalist in commercial radio and television for over six years. Gavel extensively covered sport in Canberra and commentated on Canberra Raiders and ACT Brumbies games for over 35 years. He was known as the 'Voice of Canberra sports' up until his retirement. For ABC Radio Grandstand, he commentated at seven Olympic Games and seven Commonwealth Games.

Gavel stated that his commentator highlights included Canberra Raiders (1989, 1990, 1994) and ACT Brumbies (1001, 2004) premierships, Ken Wallace's kayak gold medal at the Beijing Olympics and Chloe Esposito's modern pentathlon gold in Rio Olympics. Other sports and major international events covered by Gavel included Rugby World Cups, rowing, Socceroos, Matildas, netball, basketball, and volleyball.

He retired from the ABC on 1 September 2019 - two months short of thirty years at the ABC. After leaving the ABC, he was contracted to commentate on Raiders and Brumbies games for the ABC. He announced in September 2025 that he would end his commentating at the end of the 2025 NRL season. He writes regularly on sport in Canberra for City News and Region Canberra. He also is employed by Sport Integrity Australia as a media advisor.

ABC broadcaster Tim Lane gave Gavel the nickname 'Tireless Tim' due to his work ethic.

== Personal life ==
Gavel grew up in the Condobolin, a rural New South Wales town. In 2004, Gavel and his wife Jenny Andrew adopted two children from Ethiopia. The children's biological parents had died, and they were living with their grandmother and 14 others in one room in Addis Ababa. Their grandmother made the decision to put the children up for adoption. Their biological older sister moved to Canberra in 2009 and has permanent citizenship.

He has supported numerous local community organisations including Early Morning Centre, Ronald McDonald House, School Sport ACT, the Special Olympics and the Every Chance to Play.

== Honours and awards ==
- Australian of the Year Awards – ACT Local Hero Award, 2008
- Medal of the Order of Australia (OAM) for service to the media as a sports broadcaster, and to the community of the Australian Capital Territory, 2014
- ACT Sport Hall of Fame Associate Member, 2025
- Three-time ABC Sports Broadcaster of the Year
- Chief Minister's Award for services to broadcasting and the community
