= ACT Sport Hall of Fame =

ACT Sport Hall of Fame was established by ACTSPORT in 1995. It was taken over by the Australian Capital Territory Government after ACTSPORT ceased operations in 2015. Inductees are announced as part of the annual CBR Sport Awards. ACT Sport Hall of Fame is physically located at the University of Canberra's Sporting Commons.

There are two types of membership into the ActewAGL ACT Sport Hall of Fame:

- Full Members – Athletes only, who have been retired for at least 3 years.
- Associate Members – Administrators, officials, referees and other support staff.

== Full members ==
Name	Sport	Year
Nicole Arrold	Hockey	2016
Neal Bates	Motor Rallying	2014
Darren Beadman	Horse racing	2022
William Beadman	Billiards	1999
Gary Belcher	Rugby League	2010
Michael Bevan	Cricket	2012
Graham Bluett	Orienteering	2023
Craig Bolton	Australian football	2015
Jenny Bourne	Orienteering	1996
Ken Bradley	Boxing	2000
Melissa Breen	Athletics	2025
Joanne Brown	Softball	2005
Ray Brown	Hockey	2016
Bronwyn Calver	Cricket	2013
David Campese	Rugby union	2001
Keith Carnall	Multiple sports	1996
Lisa Carruthers	Hockey	2003
Bradley Clyde	Rugby league	2005
Susan Cook	Athletics	1997
Shaun Creighton	athletics	2026
Jason Croker	Rugby league	2014
Laurie Daley	Rugby league	2004
Roderick Dalgleish	Sailing	1996
Andrew Deane	Hockey	2001
Robert de Castella	Athletics	1999
Geoffrey Didier	Rugby union	2000
Loretta Dorman	Hockey	1997
Brennon Dowrick	Gymnastics	2011
Robin Duff	Softball	1998
Katrina Fanning	Rugby league	2024
Jamie Fernandez	Rowing	2021
David Furner	Rugby league	2015
James Galloway	Rowing	1996
Tracey Gaudry	Cycling	2007
Sue Geh	Basketball	2015
Jeff Goolagong	Softball	2019
George Gregan	Rugby union	2014
Brad Haddin	Cricket	2024
Ben Hardy	Volleyball	2017
Mike Harrow	Softball; Ice Hockey	2014
Johnny Hawke	Rugby league	1998
Bruce Hick	Rowing	2004
James Hird	Australian football	2012
Susan Hobson	Athletics	2007
Adam Jeffery	Bowls	2015
Alex Jesaulenko	Australian football	1995
Mary Johnston	Hockey	1997
Ante Juric	Soccer	2009
Stephen Larkham	Rugby union	2016
Gary Lawless	Touch football	2018
Glenn Lazarus	Rugby league	2022
Lorne Lees	Cricket	1996
Lisa Llorens	Athletics	2015
Ken Lorraway	Athletics	1997
Stuart MacDougall	Rugby union	2002
George Makin	Bowls	1998
Miriam Manzano	Figure skating	2013
Wally Masur	Tennis	1998
Peta Mackinnon	Hockey	2017
Bronwyn McCaskill	Water skiing	1996
Sally McCreedy	Softball	2008
Herb McEachin	Basketball	1996
Heather McKay	Squash	1995
Mal Meninga	Rugby league	2000
Michael Milton	Skiing	2015
Julie Murray	Soccer	2005
Paul Narracott	Athletics; Bobsleigh	2003
Michael O'Connor	Rugby union Rugby league	1995
Tom O'Connor	Multiple sports	1997
Eddie Palubinskas	Basketball	2021
Siobhan Paton	Swimming	2013
Jeremy Paul	Rugby union	2013
John Pennay	Water skiing	2003
Katrina Powell	Hockey	2009
Susan Powell	Paralympic cycling	2026
Graeme Reid	Hockey	2001
Joe Roff	Rugby union	2010
Peter Ryan	Rugby union	2009
Kerry Saxby-Junna	Athletics	2008
Tim Sheens	Rugby league	2011
George Smith	Rugby union	2025
Phil Smyth	Basketball	2002
Sharon Stekelenburg	Water skiing	2003
Megan Still	Rowing	2000
Ricky Stuart	Rugby league	2003
Ben Taylor	Hockey	2011
Petria Thomas	Swimming	2008
William Tickner	Cricket	1997
Alan Tongue	Rugby league	2019
Sacha Wainwright	Soccer	2010
Steve Walters	Rugby league	2006
Jeff Williams	Baseball	2018
Ken Williams	Bowls	1999
Tania Williams	Water skiing	1997
Amy Wilson	Soccer	2014
Ken Woods	Bowls	2001
Tony Wynd	Australian football	2004
June Yandell	Bowls	1996
Sarah Young	Hockey	2012
Michael York	Hockey	2003
Ned Zelic	Soccer	2011

== Associate members ==
Associate members are administrators, coaches and umpires/referees.

Name	Sport	Year
Russ Baker	Mountain biking	2016
Barry Barnes	Basketball	2006
Peter Baskett	Basketball	2011
Noel Bissett	Rugby league	2018
James Brophy	Swimming; Hockey; Australian football	1997
Phil Brown	Basketball	2017
Tony Campbell	Horse racing	2006
Graham Carter	Hockey	2015
Thomas Clear	Polocrosse	2000
Frank Cleary	Horse racing	2013
Chris Conti	Soccer	2008
Jack Dorman	Australian football	2011
Percival Douglas	Australian football	1996
Gordon Dunster	Soccer	2004
Jim Ferguson	Administration	2026
Laurie Fisher	Rugby union	2023
David Flatt	Volleyball	2004
Don Furner	Rugby league	2002
John Gallop	Cricket	2002
Terry Gathercole	Swimming	1998
Ben Gathercole	Triathlon	2021
Tim Gavel	Media	2025
Carrie Graf	Basketball	2024
Bob Harrow	Softball	2005
Laing Harrow	Softball; Ice Hockey	2005
Ron Harvey	Basketball	2024
Graham “Joe” Henstock	Hockey	2023
Bob Hitchcock	Rugby union	2012
David Hogg	Orienteering	2008
Alison Ide	Tennis	2009
Joan Kellett	Swimming	2017
Geoff Larkham	Rugby union	2015
Phil Lynch	Basketball; Journalism	2021
Kenneth MacDonald	Australian football	2003
Harry Marr	Australian football	2014
Colin Maxwell	Rugby union	1997
Sir Warren McDonald	Multiple sports	1997
Jill McIntosh	Netball	2026
Jim McIntosh	Shooting	1996
John McIntyre	Rugby league	2015
Les McIntyre	Rugby league	1996
Peter McMenamin	Darts	2001
Robert Mouatt	Orienteering	2013
Alan Muir	Australian football	2000
Siân Mulholland	Cycling	2009
John Mulrooney	Australian football	2002
Colin Nicholas	Cricket	1996
Chris Nunn	Athletics	2015
Reg Park	Ice skating	2012
Margaret Pereira	Bowls	2014
Heather Reid	Soccer	2025
Jim Roberts	Soccer; Futsal	2010
Don Selth	Sports history	2007
Tom Sermanni	Soccer	2012
Nicolas Szego	Soccer	1999
Dick Telford	Athletics	2018
Paul Thompson	Rowing	2017
Chris Timpson	Gymnastics	2014
Ron Tuckerman	Bowls	2010
Dave Vickers	Baseball	2007
Johnny Warren	Soccer	2002
Ken Willis	Tennis	2019
Ben Williams	Soccer	2022
Denis Wilson	Athletics	1998
