= Ocky Clark =

American competitive runner

Personal information
- Born: 14 November 1960 (age 65) Sanford, Florida, United States

Sport
- Sport: Track and field
Medal record
Representing United States
Pan American Games
Gold medal – first place	1991 Havana	800m

Octavius "Ocky" Rene Clark (born November 14, 1960) is an American competitive runner who won the gold medal in the 800 meter event at the 1991 Pan American Games.

== Early life ==
Clark was born on November 14, 1960, in Sanford, Florida and he grew up on his grandparents' farm in Bookertown, named after Booker T. Washington. Clark would interject Booker T. Washington's words of "Nothing ever comes to one, that is worth having, except as a result of hard work" into every aspect of his life. He was given the nickname Ocky by one of his favorite aunts.

== High school ==
Clark began competitive running at Sanford Seminole High School as a 3200-meter runner. With times of 4:23.8 in the Mile, 1:57 for the 800 meters and 47 splits on the 4x400 relay he was one of the top runners at his school. After high school Clark attended Ottawa University in Ottawa, Kansas briefly, but then dropped out and joined the United States Navy on October 9, 1979, in downtown Ottawa, Kansas. After basic training in Great Lakes, Illinois, he was assigned to the USS Enterprise, which was dry docked in Bremerton, Washington. It was in Bremerton where Clark began to study the training methods of Arthur Lydiard. At the Inter-Service championships held at the US Naval Academy in Annapolis, Maryland Clark clocked 1:51.65 at 800 meters.

== College ==
Clark entered Santa Fe Community College in the fall of 1982. He began with the Cross-Country team but it was clearly on the track where Clark would win two National Junior College indoor 800 meters titles and one outdoor championship. He never lost a National Junior College race. From 1982-84, Clark established the Junior College Indoor and Outdoor National Record. Accomplishing 5 Junior College All-American titles in only two years. Clark would follow one of his coaches, Coach Long to Florida State University, where he became a two time All-American and set school records at 800m 1:46.19, 1500m 3:43.02 that would stand for over 20 years.

== Athletic career ==
It was his introduction to Brazilian National Coach Luiz De Oliveira that would catapult his running career to a world class level. Under the tutelage of De Oliveira, he would become the first American to run 1:45 indoors for 800 meters. During the winter of 1989, Ocky would break the indoor American Record for 800m and also establish an indoor American Record for 1000m that would stand for fifteen years. At the height of his running career, he continued to set a personal best of 1:44.83 in Vigo, Spain on July 3, 1991, at the age of 30. 1991, was the year that Clark traveled to Havana, Cuba to represent the United States at the Pan American Games where he won the gold medal at 800 meters which was presented to him by Fidel Castro. In Rome, Italy, during the summer of 1991 Clark also ran 3:39.40 for 1500m. Also that year, he was rewarded by Track & Field News for his outstanding performances with a ninth place World Ranking. From 1985-92 Ocky Clark was one of the most feared and respected Middle Distance runners in America. Never falling out of the top 10 for 800 meters. Three times he qualified and competed at the U.S. Olympic Track and Field Trials in 1984, 1988 and 1992.

== Work in military and education ==
Ocky served two tours of duty in Iraq and a tour in Afghanistan. He is a major in the United States Air Force Reserves and is the dean of students at Winter Springs High School. He received his bachelor's degree from Florida State University and his master's degree from National University, San Diego.

== Achievements ==
Year	Competition	Venue	Position	Event	Notes
Representing the United States
1988	US National Championships	Tampa	2nd	800m	1:45.64
1990	US National Championships	Norwalk	4th	800m	1:45.99
1991	US National Championships	New York City	4th	800m	1:44.88
1991	Pan American Games	Havana, Cuba	1st	800m	1:46.91
1992	US National Championships	New Orleans	6th	800m	1:44.87
