= National Sport Information Centre =

Sports organization in Australia

Coordinates: 35°14′46.97″S 149°6′7.19″E

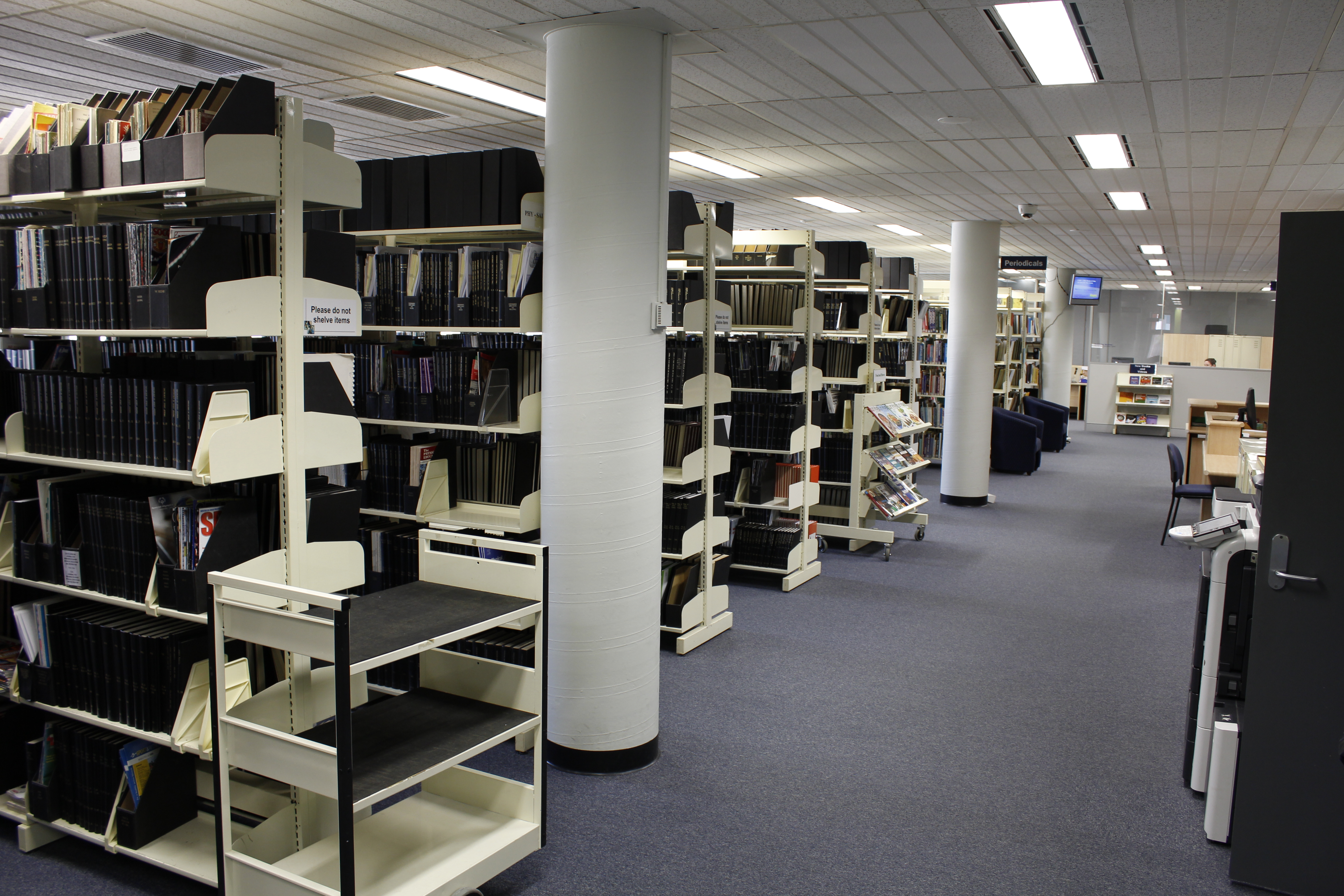
- Location: Bruce, Australian Capital Territory

Other information
- Website: http://www.ausport.gov.au/information/nsic

The National Sports Information Centre (NSIC) aims to contribute to the achievement of the Australian Sports Commission's objectives by enabling access to sports and related information and services. More than just a library, it is Australia's premier information resource centre for sport and its related disciplines.

The NSIC is funded by the Australian Sports Commission and is housed in the Corporate Services Building of the Australian Sports Commission at the Australian Institute of Sport campus in Canberra. The centre was established in 1982 as the Australian Institute of Sport Information Centre. The centre was renamed the National Sport Information Centre in 1989, reflecting the merging of the AIS with the Australian Sports Commission in 1987, with funds allocated in the 1988/89 Federal budget to expand the centre.

The centre supports sport and recreation organisations, with its collection available to the public, teachers, coaches, researchers and athletes. The collection at NSIC includes online and print resources, which is one of the most comprehensive information collections of its type in the world.
