= Ross Price =

Australian rules footballer

Personal information
- Full name: Ross Price
- Born: 12 February 1944 (age 82)
- Height: 183 cm (6 ft 0 in)
- Weight: 80 kg (176 lb)

Playing career^{1}
Years	Club	Games (Goals)
1965	North Melbourne	3 (3)
- ^{1} Playing statistics correct to the end of 1965.

Ross Price (born 12 February 1944) is a former Australian rules footballer who played with North Melbourne in the Victorian Football League (VFL).
