= Australian Institute of Sport =

Sports organisation in Australia

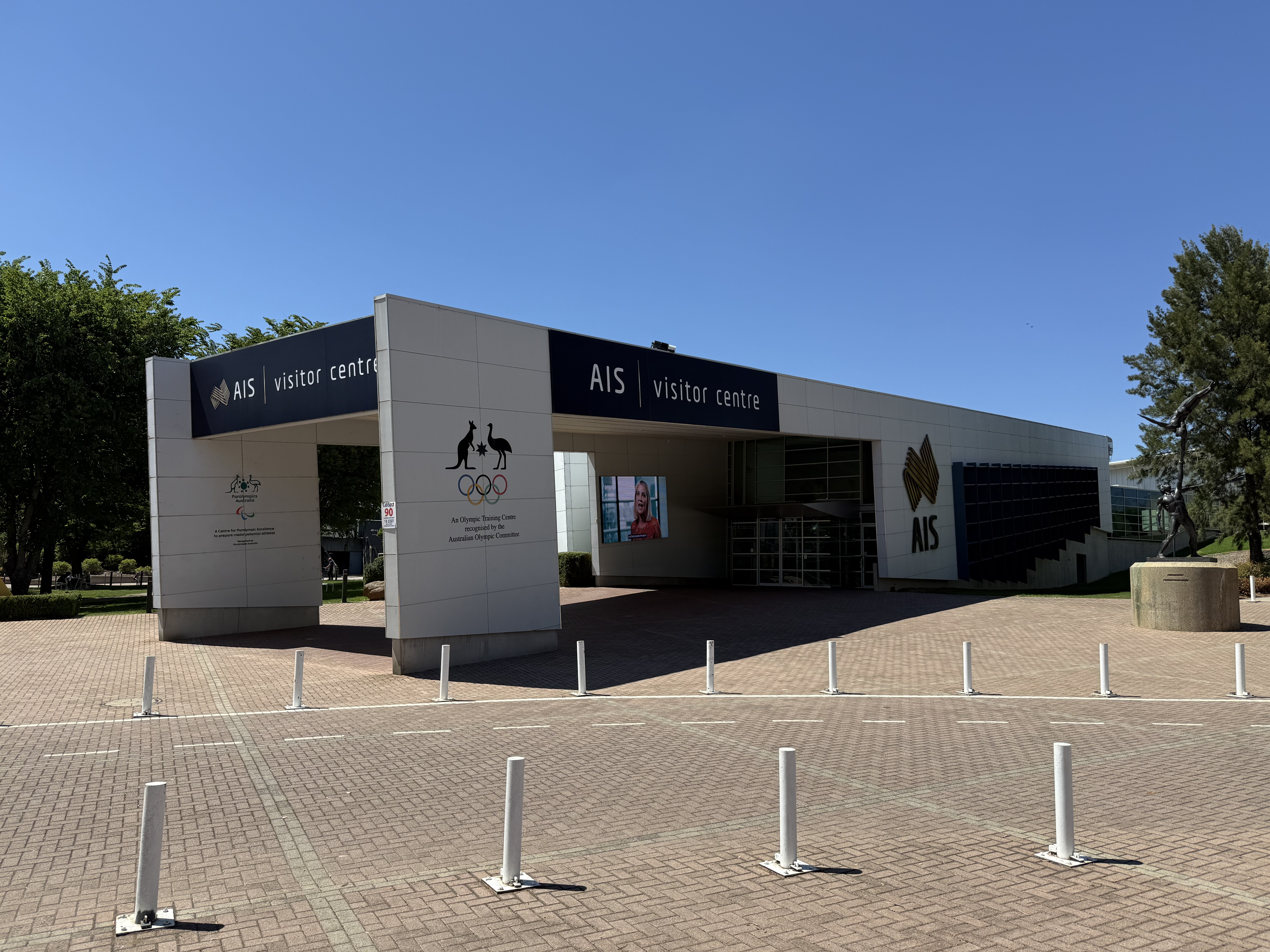
- AIS Visitor Centre, January 2026
- Abbreviation: AIS
- Formation: 1981; 45 years ago
- Type: Government agency
- Legal status: Active
- Purpose: High performance sport training institution
- Location: Canberra, Australia
- Coordinates: 35°14′50″S 149°06′15″E
- Region served: Australia
- Parent organisation: Australian Sports Commission
- Affiliations: National Institute Network
- Staff: 428 (ASC)
- Website: ais.gov.au

The Australian Institute of Sport (AIS) is a high performance sports training institution in Australia. The institute's 66-hectare (163-acre) headquarters were opened in 1981 and are situated in the northern suburb of Bruce, Canberra. The AIS is a division of the Australian Sports Commission (ASC).

== History ==
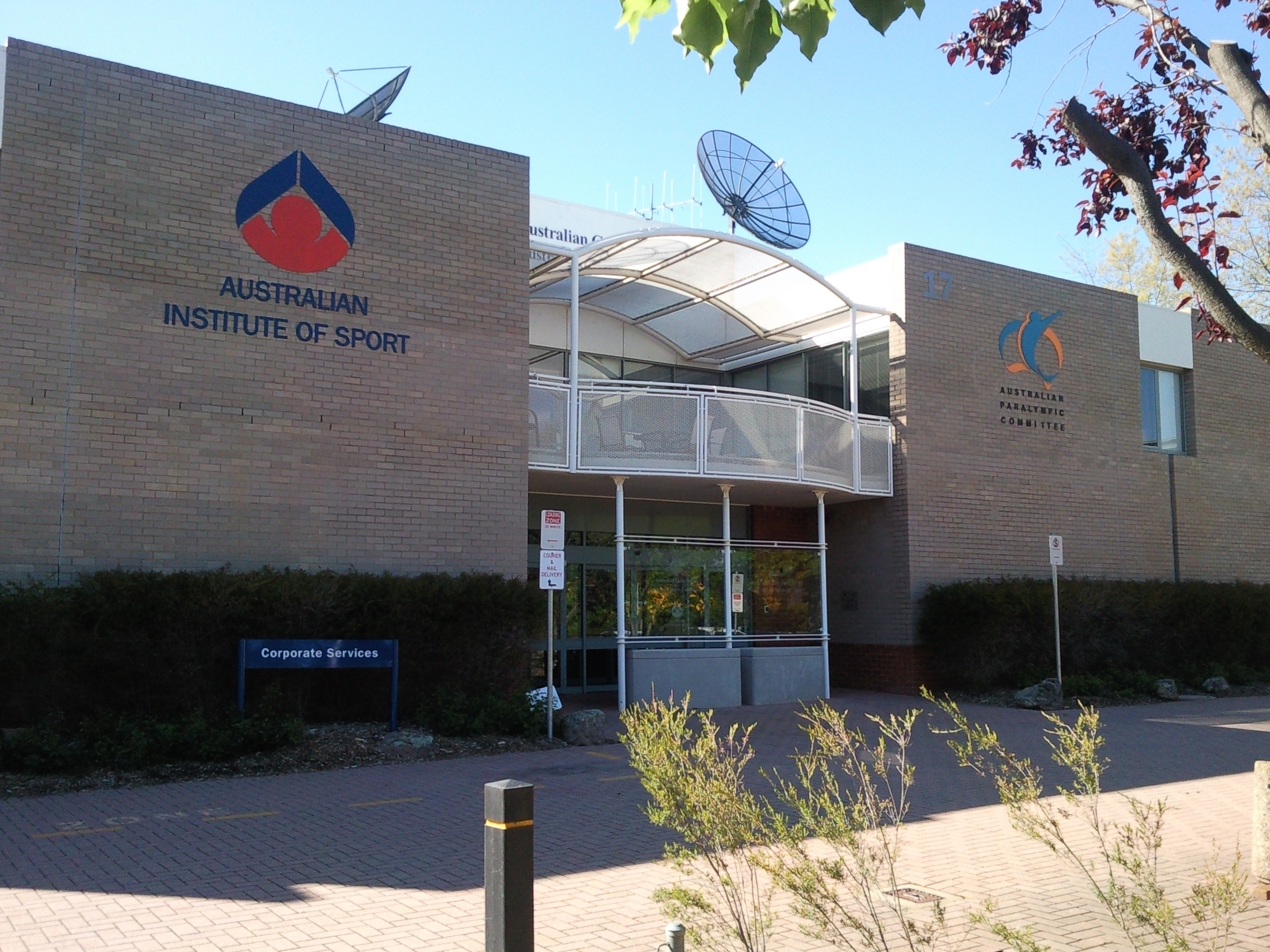
AIS Corporate Services (Building 17)

Two reports were the basis for developing the AIS: The Role, Scope and Development of Recreation in Australia (1973) by John Bloomfield and Report of the Australian Sports Institute Study Group (1975) (group chaired by Allan Coles). The need for the AIS was compounded in 1976 when the Australian Olympic team failed to win a gold medal at the Montreal Olympics, which was regarded as a national embarrassment for Australia. The institute's well-funded programs (and more generally the generous funding for elite sporting programs by Australian and State Governments) have been regarded as a major reason for Australia's recent success in international sporting competitions.

In 2011, Minister for Sport Mark Arbib announced the AIS would take responsibility for the strategic direction of high performance sport in Australia. In November 2012, the ASC released "Australia's Winning Edge 2012–2022", a high performance sport plan, which highlighted a new role for the AIS particularly in terms of developing coaches and talent identification but not directly managing national sports organisations elite athlete programs as it had done since 1981.

=== Timeline ===
A brief overview of the history of the AIS follows.

Year	Event
1980	Establishment of the Australian Institute of Sport (AIS) announced by Bob Ellicott, the Minister for Home Affairs and the Environment, on 25 January
1981	AIS officially opened by Prime Minister Malcolm Fraser on 26 January
1981	Don Talbot appointed inaugural director of the AIS and Kevan Gosper Chairman of the AIS Board
1981	Eight founding sports were basketball, gymnastics, netball, swimming, tennis, track and field, soccer, and weightlifting
1982	Commonwealth Games, Brisbane – 37 current and former AIS athletes competed three sports and won 12 gold, 12 silver and 7 bronze medals. Australia won 107 medals
1983	Facility development – Gymnastics training hall, indoor and outdoor tennis courts, and swimming complex completed
1984	Facility development – Frank Stewart Training Centre for netball, basketball and weightlifting completed
1984	Diving program in Brisbane and hockey program in Perth established
1984	John Cheffers appointed director of the AIS
1984	Olympic Games, Los Angeles, United States – 33 current and former competed in four sports and won 5 silver and 2 bronze medals. Australia won 24 medals.
1985	Squash program in Brisbane and men's water polo and rowing in Canberra established
1985	Facility development – Sports Science and Sports Medicine, Halls of Residence and administration buildings completed
1985	John Bloomfield replaces Kevan Gosper as AIS Chairman
1986	Men's cricket program in Adelaide established
1986	Commonwealth Games, Edinburgh, Scotland – 75 current and former AIS athletes competed in five sports and won 19 gold, 16 silver and 17 bronze medals, Australia won 121 medals
1987	Cycling program in Adelaide established
1987	Announcement of the merger of Australian Sports Commission and AIS
1987	Ronald Harvey appointed director of the AIS
1988	Rugby Union program in Brisbane, Sydney and Canberra established
1988	Olympic Games, Seoul, South Korea – 118 current and former athletes competing in thirteen sports and won 1 gold, 2 silver, 3 bronze medals, Australia won 14 medals
1988	Paralympic Games, Seoul, South Korea – 1 current athlete and won 2 gold medals, Australia won 96 medals
1989	Facility development – AIS canoeing facility opened on the Gold Coast
1990	Men's volleyball program in Sydney established
1990	Robert de Castella appointed director of the AIS
1990	National Sport Information Centre launched
1990	Commonwealth Games, Auckland, New Zealand – 87 current and former AIS athletes competed in six sports and won 25 gold, 25 silver and 27 bronze medals, Australia won 162 medals
1991	Oceania Olympic Training Centre established in Canberra
1991	Men's Road Cycling program established in Canberra
1991	Lifeskills for Elite Athletes Program (LEAP) commenced
1992	Olympic Games, Barcelona, Spain – 139 current and former athletes competed in thirteen sports and won 3 gold, 5 silver and 6 bronze medals, Australia won 27 medals
1992	Golf program in Melbourne program established
1992	Paralympic Games, Barcelona, Spain – 12 current and former athletes competed in two sports and won 10 gold, 8 silver and 6 bronze medals, Australia won 76 medals
1993	Women's Road Cycling in Canberra, Women's Softball in Brisbane and Women's volleyball in Perth programs established
1994	Commonwealth Games, Victoria, Canada – 87 current and former AIS athletes competed in five sports and won 35 gold, 16 silver and 15 bronze medals, Australia won 184 medals
1995	Mountain Biking program in Canberra established
1995	John Boultbee appointed as AIS director
1996	Olympic Games, Atlanta, United States – 207 current and former AIS athletes competed in thirteen sports and won 4 gold, 7 silver and 17 bronze medals, Australia won 41 medals
1996	Paralympic Games, Atlanta, United States – 26 current and former AIS athletes competed in seven sports and won 22 gold, 22 silver and 5 bronze medals, Australia won 106 medals
1997	Boxing, Wrestling, Archery, Shooting in Canberra and Australian Football in Melbourne programs established
1998	Women's Football began as an Olympic Athlete Program (OAP) initiative July 1998. In May 2000, Women's Football was made a permanent program
1998	Australian Institute of Winter Sports (AIWS) established by the Australian Olympic Committee and the AIS
1998	Commonwealth Games, Kuala Lumpur, Malaysia – 138 current and former AIS athletes competed in twelve sports and won 34 gold, 29 silver and 21 bronze medals, Australia won 200 medals
1998	Winter Olympic Games, Nagano – 8 athletes competed in three sports and won 1 bronze medal for Australia
2000	Olympic Games, Sydney – 319 current and former athletes competed in nineteen sports and won 8 gold, 11 silver and 13 bronze medals, Australia won 58 medals
2000	Paralympic Games, Sydney – 54 current and former athletes won 29 gold, 17 silver and 15 bronze medals, Australia won 149 medals
2000	Sailing and Slalom Canoeing in Sydney, and camps based Women's Cricket and triathlon programs established
2001	Michael Scott appointed director of the AIS
2001	Rugby league (decentralised) and Alpine Skiing for Athletes with Disabilities Programs established
2002	Winter Olympics, Salt Lake City, United States – 23 current and former athletes competed in five sports and won 2 gold medals, Australia won 2 medals
2002	Winter Paralympics, Salt Lake City, United States – 6 current and former athletes competed in one sport and won 6 gold and 1 silver medal, Australia won 7 medals
2002	Commonwealth Games, Manchester, England – 168 current and former athletes competed in fifteen sports and won 45 gold, 23 silver and 34 bronze medals, Australia won 207 medals
2003	Facility development – Archery Centre and AIS Rowing Centre extension opened. AIS Golf facility located at Moonah Links, near Rye on Victoria's Mornington Peninsula opened
2004	Olympic Games, Athens, Greece – 289 current and former athletes competed in 20 sports and won 10 gold, 10 silver and 12 bronze medals, Australia won 49 medals
2004	Paralympic Games, Athens, Greece – 47 current and former athletes won 13 gold, 27 silver and 23 bronze medals, Australia won 100 medals
2004	Cricket Academy moves to Brisbane
2005	Professor Peter Fricker appointed director of the AIS
2005	Facility development – New extension to the Australian Institute of Sport (AIS) Diving dry land training facility at the Sleeman Centre in Chandler, Queensland opened
2005	AIS/AVF Beach Volleyball National Centre of Excellence launched
2006	Facility development – New $17 million Aquatics Training and Recovery Centre was constructed. The 50 metre training pool has a range of high-tech performance analysis devices and biomechanical systems including instrumented start blocks and turn walls, timing gates, strategically placed cameras, filming dolly and tracks
2006	Winter Olympics, Turin, Italy – 23 current and former athletes competed in six sports and won 1 gold and 1 bronze medal, Australia won 3 medals
2006	Winter Paralympics, Turin, Italy – 9 current and former athletes competed in one sport and won 1 silver and 1 bronze medal, Australia won 2 medals
2006	Commonwealth Games, Melbourne – 177 current and former athletes competed in 13 sports and won 42 gold, 34 silver and 34 bronze medals, Australia won 222 medals
2007	Facility development – AIS Hub opened. The AIS hub features a 110-metre indoor running track (with jumping pit), new physiology laboratories and an enhanced strength and conditioning gymnasium New AIS Athlete Residences opened
2008	Olympic Games, Beijing, China – 263 current and former AIS athletes won 7 gold, 9 silver and 7 bronze medals, Australia won 46 medals
2008	Paralympic Games Beijing – 47 current and former AIS athletes won 18 gold, 12 silver and 13 bronze medals, Australia won 79 medals
2010	Olympic Winter Games, Vancouver, Canada – 22 current and former AIS athletes won 1 gold, and 1 silver medal
2010	Paralympic Winter Games, Vancouver, Canada – 9 current AIS athletes won 1 silver and 3 bronze medals, Australia won a total of 4 medals
2010	Commonwealth Games, New Delhi, India – 158 current and former (including Paralympic scholarship holders) competed in 12 sports and won 88 medals; 41 gold, 23 silver and 24 bronze, Australia won a total of 177 medals
2011	European Training Centre opened in Gavirate, province of Varese, Italy
2012	Matt Favier commenced as director of the AIS in March
2012	Australia's Winning Edge strategy provides a new leadership direction for the AIS, with national sports organisations taking full responsibility for AIS sports programs at the end of 2013
2013	AIS Combat Centre established
2014	Australian Institute of Sport launched a new brand and logo
2014	Annual awards renamed AIS Sport Performance Awards.
2014	The former archery centre converted to the Football Centre
2017	Matt Favier resigns as AIS director in June
2017	Peter Conde appointed ninth AIS director in August
2017	The NBA Academy opened at the AIS in Canberra, sharing facilities with Basketball Australia's Centre of Excellence
2018	Australian Government launched the National Sport Plan, Sport 2030
2019	The AIS, in partnership with Volleyball Australia launched the first Australian all-weather beach volleyball training facility on the AIS Canberra campus
2020	The AIS helped to deliver the $6.5m water jump in Brisbane for Australian aspiring Winter Athletes to train at home
2022	The AIS/ASC published the National Sport Research Agenda
2022	The AIS became an active partner in one of 11 IOC Research Centres for 2023–2026, led by La Trobe Sport and Exercise Medicine
2023	The AIS hosted the Quantum Meets Sport workshop with Australia's Chief Scientist Dr Cathy Foley, exploring quantum technologies for sport
2025	AIS releases updated National Science and Research Priorities for High Performance Sport ahead of the 2028 Summer Olympics

== Institute ==
The AIS employs a number of staff who primarily work in Sports Science and Sports Medicine, which includes disciplines such as sports nutrition, performance analysis, skill acquisition, physiology, recovery, biomechanics, athlete career education, strength and conditioning, psychology, physical therapies, talent identification, and applied performance research.

There are a number of sculptures located throughout the Bruce Campus, such as 'Acrobats', 'Gymnast', 'Pole Vaulter' and 'Soccer Players' by John Robinson and the 'Swimmer' by Guy Boyd. After the Sydney 2000 Olympics, two of the three sculptures - ' Gymnast' and 'Wheelchair Basketballer' - that were located on the Sydney Tower Eye prior to the Olympics were installed at the AIS.

The AIS Arena is a 4,200 capacity indoor stadium which has been used for sports such as basketball, gymnastics and volleyball as well as music concerts. Directly adjacent to, but not strictly part of the institute is the 25,000 capacity outdoor Canberra Stadium which has hosted matches of all the major forms of football played in Australia.

In 2005, 2009, and 2010 the institute won awards at the prestigious Canberra and Capital Region Tourism Awards. These awards were given in recognition of the daily public tours that are available. Each tour, which takes in several different buildings of the institute as well as the arena and the Sportex zone, is led by an athlete currently training there.

== Logo ==
Shortly after its inception in 1981, the AIS held a competition for a symbol that would depict the AIS aim of "achieving supremacy in sport". Over 500 designs were submitted. The winner was Rose-Marie Derrico, a design student from Bendigo, Victoria. Her design showed an athlete with hands clasped above the head in recognition of victory. The colours of the logo were red, white and blue, which are the same colours as the Australian flag.

On 3 February 2014, the AIS launched a new logo in line with its new direction as outlined in its Winning Edge program that was launched in 2012. Landor Associates designed the new brand and logo. The gold in the brand representing Australia's pursuit of gold.

== National Training Centres ==
In November 2012, the AIS announced that, following the introduction of the Winning Edge strategy, control of its direct sports programs would be transferred to individual sporting bodies. As a result, many National Training Centres, or Centres of Excellence, were established at the AIS over the next two years, replacing the scholarship programs. These include:

- Basketball Australia Centre of Excellence
- Netball Australia Centre of Excellence
- Football Federation of Australia Centre of Excellence
- Volleyball Australia Centre of Excellence
- Rowing Australia National Training Centre
- Swimming Australia National Training Centre

The AIS does continue to support other athletes in other sports however they are self funded and not under the National Training Centre banner.

== Former sports programs ==
Up until 2013, the AIS offered scholarships to athletes across 36 programs in 26 different sports:

- Artistic gymnastics, athletes with disabilities - swimming, athletics and winter sports, basketball, netball, rowing, football (men & women), tennis, swimming, track and field, volleyball (men) and water polo (women) administered from Canberra
- Diving, squash, softball and cricket (men & women) administered from Brisbane
- Sailing and slalom canoeing administered from Sydney
- Hockey administered from Perth
- Sprint canoeing, triathlon and BMX administered from the Gold Coast
- Road cycling, track cycling and beach volleyball administered from Adelaide
- Australian rules football, rugby union and rugby league are camps based programs
- Winter sports (in partnership with the Olympic Winter Institute of Australia) administered from Melbourne

Sports that previously had an AIS program but were discontinued prior to 2013 included: weightlifting, water polo (men), volleyball (women), wrestling, shooting, archery, boxing (1997 - 2010) and golf. .

The head coach for the AIS boxing program from 1997 to 2010 was Bodo Andreass.

== Notable athletes ==
Many prominent Australian athletes have taken up AIS scholarships. In 2001, the AIS established the Best of the Best Award to recognise highly performed AIS athletes. As of 2011, the following athletes have been recognised - Alisa Camplin, Robert De Castella, John Eales, Simon Fairweather, Neil Fuller, Bridgette Gusterson, Rechelle Hawkes, Shane Kelly, Luc Longley, Michelle Martin, Glenn McGrath, Michael Klim, Michael Milton, Clint Robinson, Louise Sauvage, Kate Slatter, Zali Steggall, Mark Viduka, Vicki Wilson, Todd Woodbridge, Lauren Jackson, Chantelle Newbery, Petria Thomas, Kerry Saxby-Junna, Jamie Dwyer, Anna Meares, Malcolm Page, Ricky Ponting, Oenone Wood and Matthew Cowdrey. In August 2013, Stuart O'Grady was indefinitely suspended from the 'Best of the Best' due to his admission to doping in 1998.

The Australian Institute of Sport Alumni highlights the many prominent Australian athletes that the AIS has assisted.

=== Athlete of the Year ===
Since 1984, the AIS has named an Athlete of the Year. For the first twenty years, the award was predominately made to one athlete only. In 2004 a male and female athlete were awarded with the accolade; and the awarding has varied over the ensuing years.

Year	Female athlete(s)		Male athlete(s)		Notes
Year	Name	Sport	Name	Sport	Notes
1984	Karen Phillips	Swimming	no award		
1985	Michele Pearson	Swimming	no award		
1986	no award		James Galloway	Rowing	
1987	Kerry Saxby	Track and field	no award		
1988	Kerry Saxby	Track and field	no award		
1989	Kerry Saxby	Track and field	no award		
1990	no award		Steve McGlede	Track cycling	
1991	Linley Frame	Swimming	no award		
1992	no award		Clint Robinson	Flatwater canoeing	
1993	World Junior Female Basketball Team		Men's Track Cycling Pursuit Team		
1994	Australian Women's Hockey Team		no award		
1995	no award		Shane Kelly	Track cycling	
1996	Megan Still; Kate Slatter	Rowing	no award		
1997	Louise Sauvage	Track and field	no award		
1998	no award		Michael Klim	Swimming	
1999	no award		Michael Klim	Swimming	
2000	no award		Simon Fairweather	Archery	
2001	Petria Thomas	Swimming	Philippe Rizzo	Gymnastics	
2002	Petria Thomas	Swimming	no award		
2003	no award		Nathan Baggaley	Flatwater canoeing	
2004	Petria Thomas	Swimming	Ryan Bayley	Track cycling	
2005	no award		Peter Robertson; Robin Bell	Triathlon; slalom canoeing	
2006	no award		Philippe Rizzo	Gymnastics	
2007	Anna Meares	Track cycling	Nathan Deakes	Track and field	
2008	no award		Ken Wallace; Heath Francis	Flatwater canoeing; Track and field	
2009	Emma Moffatt	Triathlon	Brenton Rickard	Swimming	
2010	Lydia Lassila	Freestyle skiing	no award		
2011	Anna Meares	Track cycling	no award		
2012	Alicia Coutts	Swimming	Tom Slingsby	Sailing	
2013	Caroline Buchanan; Kim Crow	Cycling; Rowing	no award		
2014	Jessica Fox	Slalom canoeing	no award		
2015	Emily Seebohm	Swimming	Jason Day	Golf	
2016	Kim Brennan	Rowing	Kyle Chalmers	Swimming	
2017	Sally Pearson	Athletics	Scott James	Winter sport	

== Notable coaches ==
AIS was established to provide high level coaching to Australian athletes. Since its establishment in 1981, the AIS has employed highly credentialed Australian and international coaches. Original coaches were - Bill Sweetenham and Dennis Pursley (swimming), Wilma Shakespear in netball, Adrian Hurley and Patrick Hunt (basketball), Peter Lloyd and Kazuyu Honda (gymnastics), Jimmy Shoulder (football), Ray Ruffels and Helen Gourlay (tennis), Kelvin Giles, Gary Knoke and Merv Kemp (track and field), and Lyn Jones (weightlifting).

Other notable AIS coaches - Charlie Walsh (cycling), Barry Dancer and Richard Charlesworth(hockey), Terry Gathercole (swimming), Marty Clarke (basketball).

== Sports medicine and sport science ==
AIS established sports medicine and sports science services and research programs when established in 1981. Dr Dick Telford was its first Co-ordinator of Sports Science and Medicine. Other notable staff have included: Dr Peter Fricker, Professor Allan Hahn, Professor Louise Burke, Dr Bruce Mason and Keith Lyons.

The AIS Sports Medicine department in 2020 released guidelines on the management of COVID-19 in athletes and a template for return to sport in Australia after the Coronavirus lockdown. These guidelines were used by the Australian government National Cabinet and the various Australian state governments to recommend stages for recommencing sport after the vast majority closed down in late March to early May 2020. Generally the doctors working at the AIS have been sports medicine specialists qualified through the Australasian College of Sport and Exercise Physicians.

Under the leadership of AIS Chief Science Officer Paolo Menaspà, in March 2022 the AIS released the National High Performance Sport Research Agenda, designed to prioritise resources in areas of critical importance to Australia's high performance sport system. In July 2022 the AIS awarded grants to six Australian research teams, aimed at optimising the performance of elite athletes, coaches and support staff. The document "Recommendations for conducting AIS-supported research in high performance sport" was also released in 2022. The "Future of Australian Sport, Megatrends shaping the sport sector over coming decades" was published in December 2022. In August 2023 the AIS, together with Australia's Chief Scientist Cathy Foley, organised the Quantum Meets Sport workshop, a world first which led to the Queensland Government committing $8.5 million to support quantum research with an impact on the Brisbane 2032 Olympic and Paralympic Games. The "National Science and Research Priorities for High Performance Sport" were updated and released in March 2025, recognising matters that are important to the Australian high-performance system toward the 2028 Summer Olympics. In early 2026, the AIS released the report "Comparison of AI Solutions for Evidence Synthesis in High-Performance Sport".

== Olympic Winter Institute of Australia ==
The AIS and the Australian Olympic Committee formed the Australian Institute of Winter Sports after the 1998 Winter Olympics. The organisation was renamed to the Olympic Winter Institute of Australia on 1 July 2001. It provides training in alpine skiing, freestyle skiing (including aerial and mogul), snowboarding, short track speed skating and figure skating. It is also a partner with the AIS in skeleton (toboganning).

== Elite Athlete Education Network ==
The Elite Athlete Education Network (EAEN), formerly known as the Elite Athlete Friendly Universities (EAFU) network, is a network of universities and other education providers who are committed to supporting elite student athletes in partnership with the Australian Institute of Sport. The guiding principles which underpin the network include:

- Appointing a dedicated staff contact to support elite student athletes during their studies. This contact is responsible for advising student athletes in regard to academic planning, as well as supporting flexible arrangements to fulfil academic requirements.
- Tailoring or developing flexible study options to support the needs of elite student athletes.

== Basketball program ==
Men's and women's representative basketball teams from the AIS have been in existence since the institute's establishment in 1981. The women's team competed in the Women's National Basketball League (WNBL) between 1981 and 2012, while the men's team competed in the South East Australian Basketball League (SEABL) between 1982 and 2010.

In 2014, the Basketball Australia Centre of Excellence was established by Basketball Australia at the AIS after they assumed responsibility of the basketball program.

== Partner school ==
The institute's partner school is UC Senior Secondary College Lake Ginninderra, with the AIS having sent its Year 11 and 12 scholarship-holders there since the college's inception in 1987.

== Bibliography ==
- Daly, John, Quest for Excellence : the Australian Institute of Sport, Australian Government Publishing Service, Canberra, 1991
- Australian Sports Commission, Excellence : the Australian Institute of Sport. 2nd ed. Canberra, Australian Sports Commission, 2002.
- Bloomfield, John, Australia's sporting success : the inside story, UNSW Press, Sydney, 2003
- Ferguson, Jim, More than sunshine and vegemite : success the Australian way, Halstead Press, Sydney, 2007
