= Peter Fricker (sports physician) =

Australian sports physician and administrator

Peter Allen Fricker,OAM, (born 12 February 1950) is an Australian sports physician and administrator. He was a team doctor to several Australian Olympic and Commonwealth Games teams and director of the Australian Institute of Sport between 2005 and 2011.

== Personal life ==
He was born on 12 February 1950 in Adelaide, South Australia to Lyall Petrie Fricker and Lourdes Victoria. His father had a distinguished career in education on Australia. He has three brothers and a sister. He married Robyn Dennis.

Fricker attended St Pius X College in Chatswood. He wanted to be a doctor at the age of 10. In 1974, he completed a Bachelor of Medicine and Surgery at University of New South Wales. Whilst undertaking his medical degree, he took an interest in sports medicine and assisted his twin brother John as a sports trainer with the University of Sydney rugby league team. His internships and rheumatologist in training were undertaken at Woden Valley and Royal Canberra Hospitals (merged to become Canberra Hospital) and Repatriation General Hospital between 1974 and 1977. In 1979, he was working in private practice in suburb of Belconnen, Australian Capital Territory, taking a special interest in sports medicine.

== Career ==
=== Australian Institute of Sport ===
The Australian Institute of Sport, commonly referred to as the AIS, was established in 1981 but did not initially appoint a full-time doctor. Fricker treated AIS athletes from his private practice until accepting a full-time role as in 1983. He was director of AIS Medical services from 1983 to 2000. In 2001, he was appointed coordinator of sports science and sports medicine. From 2001 to 2005, he was assistant director. In 2005, he was appointed the seventh director of the AIS, a position he held until he resigned to take up a position in Qatar in 2011.

At the time of his departure, he was the longest serving AIS director. On his departure from the AIS, the Minister for Sport, Senator Mark Arbib said “"He has been Director of the Australian Institute of Sport since May 2005 and has played a critical role in working with both our Olympic and Paralympic sports and our National Sporting Organisations. Peter has worked tirelessly to support our elite athletes and has served the Institute and Australian sport with great distinction “

=== Sporting teams ===
In his early medical career in Canberra, he was the sports physician for the Canberra City Soccer Club (1977–1978) and Canberra Cannons basketball team (1979–1996). He was Deputy Medical Director for the Australian teams for four successive Olympic Games (1988 to 2000) and was medical director at the 2004 Athens Olympics. He has served on the Australian Olympic Committee's Medical Commission since 1993. His Commonwealth Games involvement has included being a team physician for the 1986 and 1998 teams and medical director for the 2002 and 2006 teams. He is currently the medical director of the Australian Commonwealth Games Association. He has also been the team physician for Australian junior men's basketball and Australian gymnastics teams.

=== Sports medicine ===
Fricker has contributed to sports medicine in Australia and internationally through several roles and was a member of the Australian Sports Drug Medical Advisory Committee and the Anti Doping Research Panel from 2000 to 2005. He was president of the Australasian College of Sports Physicians from 1994 to 1996 He has co-authored several books and written numerous articles related to sports medicine.

Fricker is currently adjunct professor at the Australian National University, the University of Canberra, and at the University of North Carolina.

== Recognition ==
- 1993 – Medal of the Order of Australia (OAM) for services to sports medicine.
- 2001 – Australian Sports Medal for long service to sports medicine.
- 2004 – Bulletin Magazine's Smart 100 List.
- 2009 – Fellow of the Australasian College of Sports Physicians.
