= David Buttifant =

Australian rules footballer and sports scientist

Personal information
- Full name: David Buttifant
- Born: 3 March 1964 (age 62)
- Original teams: Koroit, (Hampden)
- Height: 187.5
- Weight: 87
- Position: Mid field

Playing career^{1}
| Years | Club | Games (Goals) |
| 1987 | Richmond | 2 (0) |
- ^{1} Playing statistics correct to the end of 1987.

David Buttifant (born 3 March 1964) is a former Australian rules footballer who played for Richmond in the Victorian Football League (VFL) in 1987. He was recruited from the Koroit Football Club in the Hampden Football League. He later played for Box Hill in the Victorian Football Association.

He was Collingwood's sport science director for 13 years, mostly under the coaching tenure of Mick Malthouse, and he played an important role in Collingwood's 2010 premiership victory and assisting the Magpies to Grand Finals in 2002, 2003 and 2011. While at Collingwood, he led the way with the use of altitude in pre-season training. He resigned from the Magpies in September 2013, and joined the Carlton Football Club, where Malthouse was now coaching, in the same role.

He had previously worked with the Australian Olympic team. Prior to the Sydney Olympics he worked at North Melbourne Football Club as Head of Fitness between 1994 -1998.[https://www.vu.edu.au/alumni/alumni-stories-events/featured-alumni-stories/david-buttifant-a-phd-mba-afl-premiership (ref) He has a PhD in exercise physiology.

In 2011, Malthouse and Buttifant authored the book The Ox Is Slow But The Earth Is Patient.

He currently Director of Resilience Builders https://resiliencebuilders.com.au/ delivering resilience, leadership and high-performance programs across corporate and educational settings.

In 2026, Buttifant published ‘‘Life’s Tough – Be Tougher’’, a book exploring practical strategies for developing resilience and navigating adversity."Life's Tough – Be Tougher". Allen & Unwin.
