= Childhood obesity in Australia =

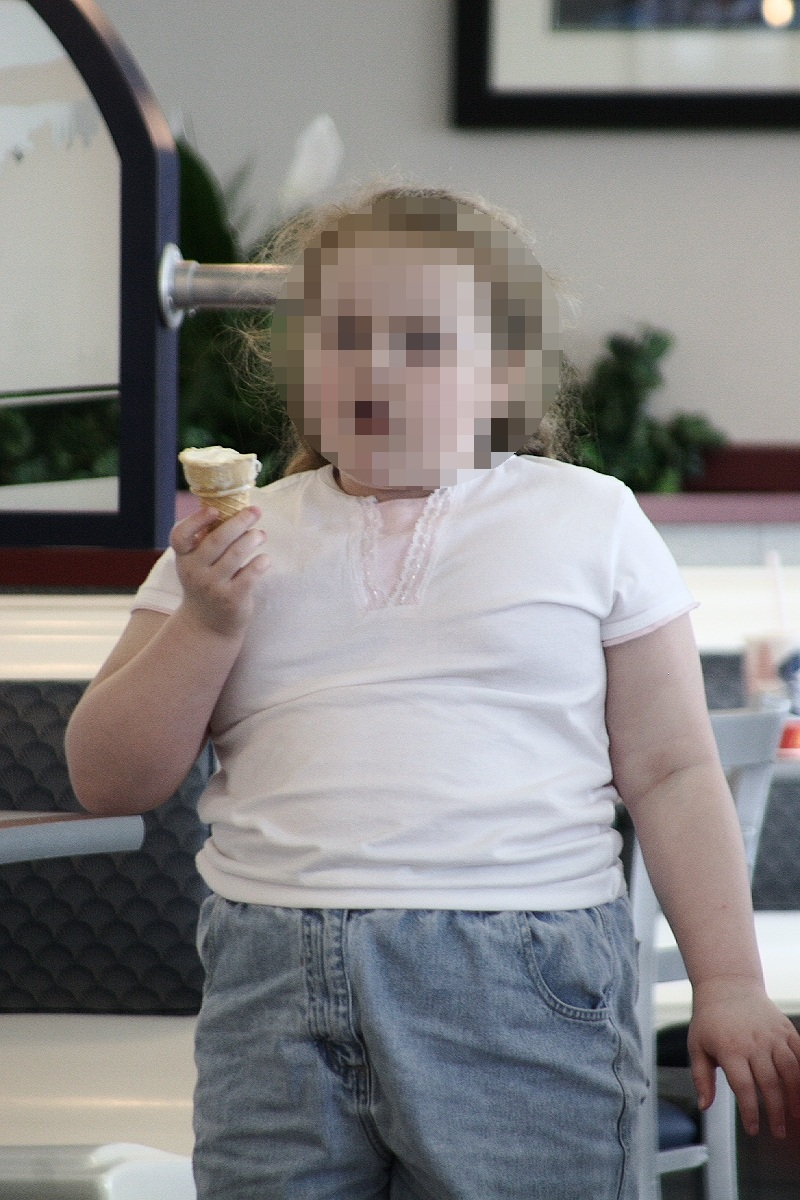
Obesity currently affects 8% of children in Australia.

Obesity is defined as the excessive accumulation of fat and is predominantly caused when there is an energy imbalance between calorie consumption and calorie expenditure. Childhood obesity is becoming an increasing concern worldwide, and Australia alone recognizes that 1 in 4 children are either overweight or obese.

For Australians aged between 4 and 17 years, obesity is a very concerning condition as once gained it is favourably harder to be liberated from. Short-term effects on children can mean a decrease in their psychological well-being (stigmatisation and poor self-esteem) as well as physical deteriorations such as sleep apnea, breathlessness and cardiovascular disease. With an increase risk of adult obesity being associated with childhood obesity there are numerous long-term effects that can ultimately hinder the life expectancy of individuals including the development of serious diseases.

In order to combat the worldwide epidemic of childhood obesity it is imperative that the issue is addressed in its early stages. The main preventative measures to be implemented include increasing physical exercise, dietary knowledge and decreasing sedentary behaviours.

== Measuring obesity ==
A table showing Body Mass Index as a measurement of height (m) compared to weight (kg)

Body Mass Index (BMI) is a common and useful measurement of body fat that helps individuals understand the difference between being overweight and obese. The system can be used to calculate a person's BMI by dividing their weight (in kilograms) by the square of their height (in meters). According to the World Health Organization (2015) a BMI greater than or equal to 25 kg/m2 in adults is overweight and greater than or equal to 30 kg/m2 regards individuals as obese.

Using the BMI method, however, to measure a child's excess weight can encounter regular issues. BMI is used to decipher an individual's excess body weight but not their excess body fat. In this way the measurements taken from a child who is at different stages of their sexual maturation compared to another may alter the reliability of the data. Other issues that may affect the results surrounding this method for children and adolescents includes their age, sex, ethnicity muscle and bone mass, their height as well as their sexual maturation levels.

Using the percentile ranking to determine whether or not a child or adolescent between 2–20 years old is overweight or obese inherits the same techniques as a BMI except the interpretation of the data collected is varied. Information gathered using the percentile ranking takes into consideration the child's age and sex, recognising that the amount of body fat regularly changes with age and sex. The BMI-for-age highlights the values among children of the same sex and age and categorises overweight adolescents as being between the 80th percentile and less than the 95th percentile. Obese children are classified as being equal to or greater than the 95th percentile.

Obesity can also be determined by measuring the circumference of an individual's waist.

Although calculating an individual's BMI is the most recommended indicator it doesn't distinguish the risk of disease. Regular monitoring of fat distribution, genetics and fitness levels should be maintained to assess the likelihood of disease. Alternative ways in which an individual can have their weight assessed, other than a BMI test, includes measuring the circumference of their waist or using the skin fold test.

== History ==
As early evolution has it, prehistoric ancestors in the form of hunter/gathers maintained the mentality that food supplies were unpredicted and their next meal was unknown. In this way, ancestors would eat whenever possible and efficiently store the energy absorbed as fat to use when resources were scarce. Since then, the environment in which we live in, has evolved rapidly with food supplies readily and effortlessly available. Consequently, the approach to conservation of energy from food has now been transformed into overeating and under-activity, generating a recipe of chronic disease and premature death.

Childhood obesity has been a consistent health burden throughout the entirety of Australia's history with close regard placed on genetics and an energy imbalance between calorie consumption and expenditure. Between 1985 and 1995 the number of obese children increased dramatically from both perspectives of boys (10.7% to 20.5%) and girls (11.8% to 21.1%) aged 7–15 and 5–17 in the two respective year brackets. In the 10 years that followed, until 2008, figures continued to rise from 21% to 25% resulting in a similar percentile for both males and females. In the 2011/12 Australian Bureau of Statistics- Australian Health Survey, statistics reiterated the lack of substantial preventative methods, highlighting a 1% increase and therefore a total of 26% of children aged between 5–17 years as being either overweight or obese.

== World comparisons ==
The worldwide prevalence of obesity in males (2008) – The darker areas represent a higher percentage of obese males.

The worldwide prevalence of obesity in females (2008) – The darker areas represent a higher percentage of obese females.

Childhood obesity is a worldwide epidemic that, in 2009, affected 155 million (1 in 10) 5–17 year olds. In regards to The International Association for the Study of Obesity, figures collected in 2013 highlight that Greece held the highest values for both overweight and obese boys and girls (44% and 38% respectively). Twenty four percent of Australian girls, according to the Organisation for Economic Co-operation and Development (OECD), were considered obese, ranking in at 10th out of 40 countries.

Both Spain and Canada reported the same statistical findings of 24%. In regards to obese and overweight boys, Australia is ranked 18th, showing an identical figure of 22% to that of the United Kingdom. The lowest ratings of obesity were displayed by Indonesia showing values of 11% and 8% respectively for boys and girls. In 2013, the World Health Organization estimated that over 42 million children under the age of five were obese with 31 million of these living in developing countries.

== Causes ==
The causes of childhood obesity can be based on both a combination of individual choices and socio-environmental adaptions with genetic factors playing an important role also.

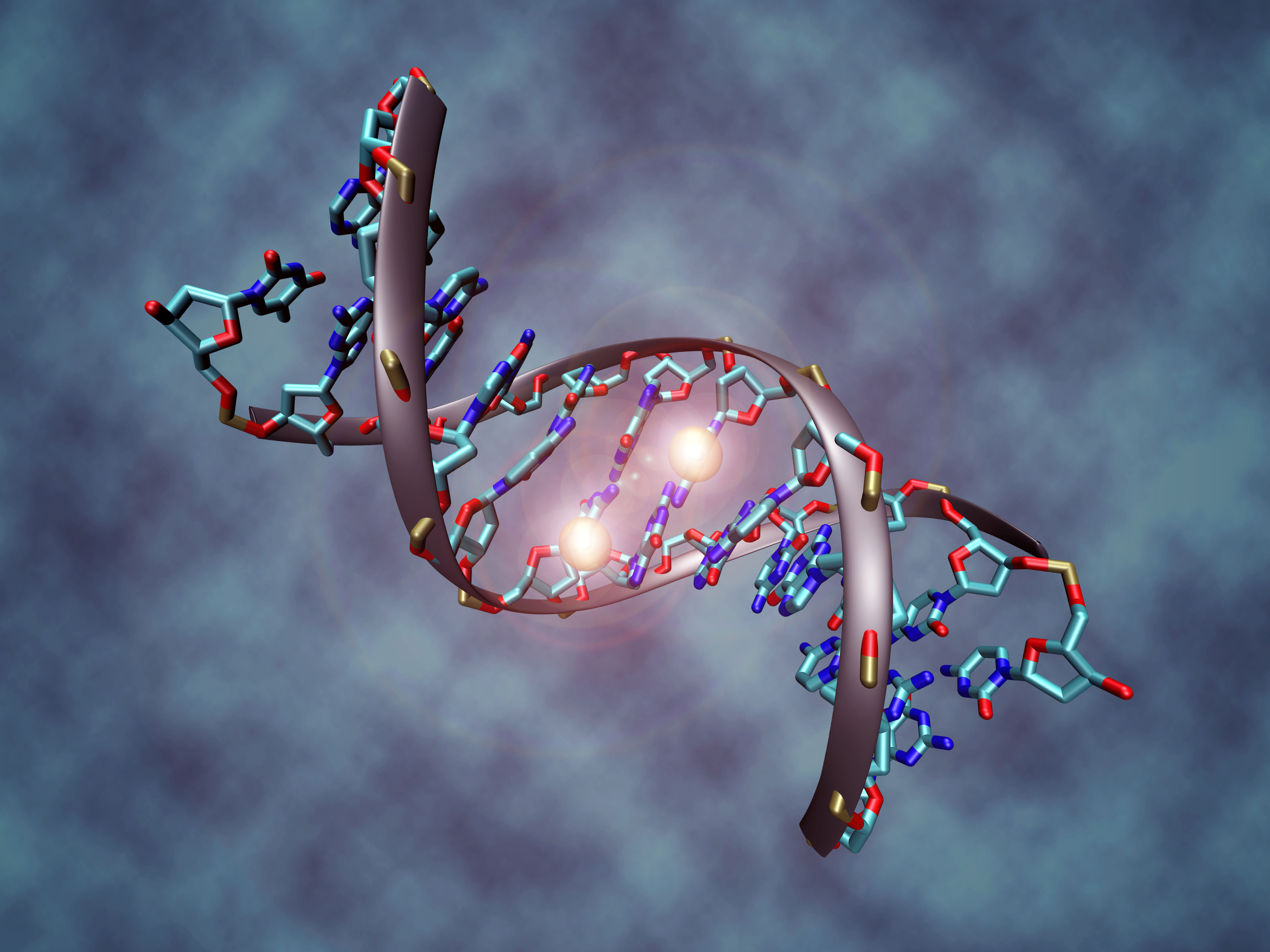
Epigenetic modification is a primary cause in the obesity epidemic.

=== Genetics ===
Genetics, according to the Australian Health Survey plays a primary role in determining obesity. In 2011/2012 it was recorded that 90% of the Australian population had inherited their obese tendencies due to the epigenetic modifications of their mothers during pregnancy. Interchanging closely with the genetic factor, the environment and individual temptations are also highlighted as contributing causes to the worldwide epidemic. The genetic configuration influences the tendencies to become overweight, and diet and physical activity determines to what extent those tendencies are elaborated.

=== Diet and parental influence ===
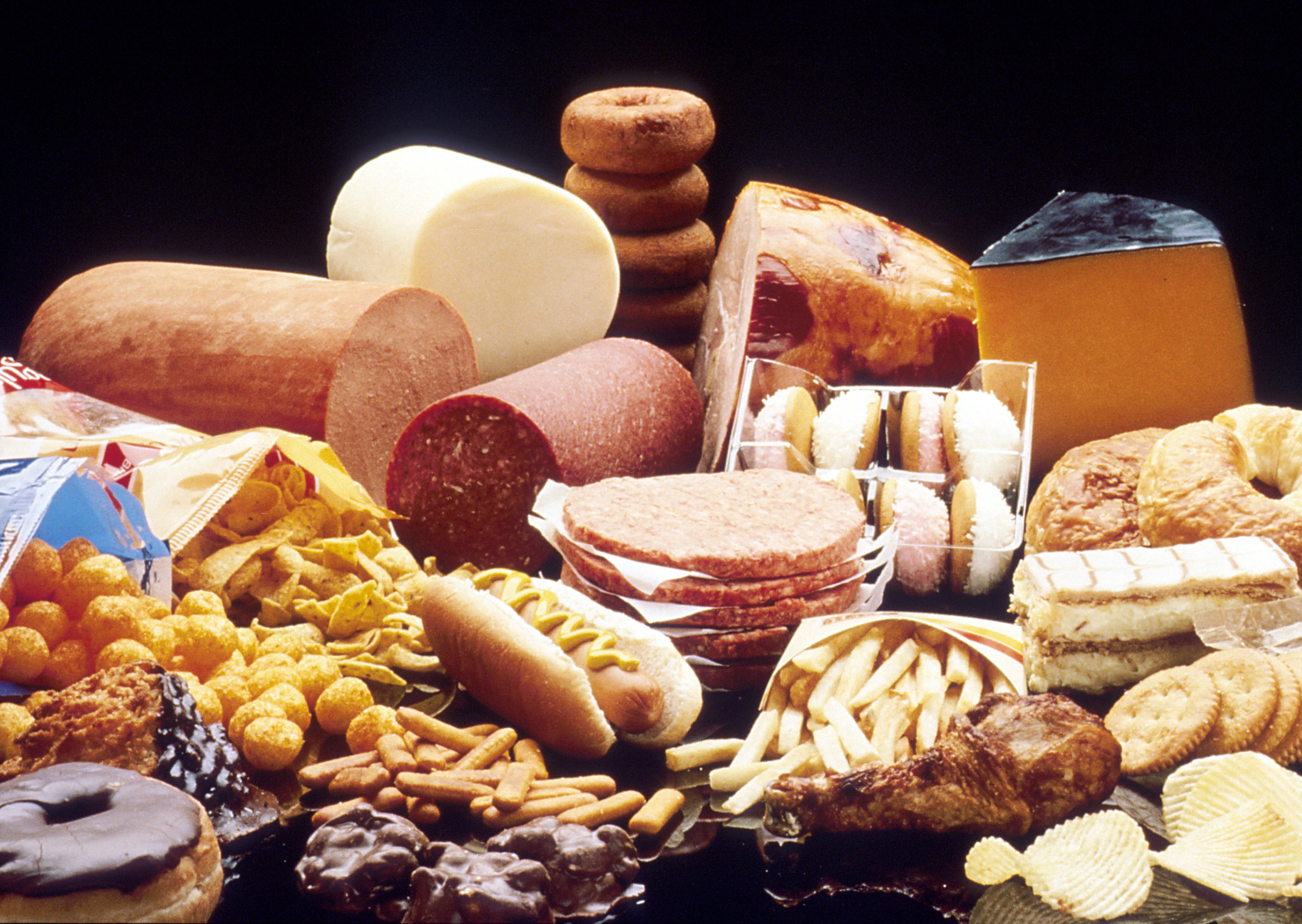
"Treat" foods that parents are familiarising their children with are key contributors to obesity.

Parents, guardians and teachers all play a key role in the mentality that children have towards certain types of foods as they develop. The first five years of a child's life, when developing a familiarisation with solids, can ultimately have a negative influence on the foods that they give preference to in the future. "Treat" food consumption, which is a well- intentioned technique used by parents to reward their children, contributes to between 23- 24% of an individual's total daily energy intake (aged between 2–16 years old).

With no more than 20% being recommended daily, it is visibly clear that adults may not be allowing their children to develop an intrinsic motivation for healthy foods, 'rewarding' them with energy dense snacks such as potato chips, muffins, lollies, and popcorn from the theatre. A large popcorn at Hoyts', Australia's largest cinema chain, contains more than 700 calories, and is the most popular item on their menu. According to the Australian Dietary Guidelines 2013 a child aged between 4–8 years old should consume 1 ½ serves of fruit and 4 ½ serves of vegetable daily with individuals aged 9 and above recommended to consume "2 and 5".

Parents can help to positively influence their child's diet by being an active role model and eating a wide variety of fruits and vegetables themselves. Encouraging children to eat a variety of different nutritional snacks and making fruits and vegetables visually appealing through changing their shapes can also help to entice and excite children about fruit and vegetable consumption.

== Societal influences ==
In order for an individual (children) to remain healthy, there must be a balance between the amount of calories consumed and the amount of calories expend (through physical activity). Socio-environmental factors that disrupt this energy consumption/ expenditure balance include changes to the economy (food costs), an increased dependency on cars and sedentary behaviours and an increased marketing of poor nutritional foods.

=== Media and advertising ===
Advertising is a common aspect of today's society and is strategically conducted and presented and conducted to persuade consumers to respond in a particular way. Approximately 30% of advertisements conducted during children's television viewing hours in Australia are directed on food intending to influence children towards unhealthy food products. Companies such as McDonald's, in particular, have specifically created and designed their advertisements and commercials so that they are appealing and enticing to children. Through the use of bright alluring colours, the introduction of the Happy Meal, the strategic use of playgrounds and the Ronald McDonald character, it is evident that children are the main target audience (Super Size Me).

In a similar way, Australian sporting teams are often sponsored by companies who market unhealthy food products to children and young adults. Recent reports show that during a high-profile cricket match, the KFC (Kentucky Fried Chicken) logo was clearly visible for 61% of playing time and XXXX beer logo clearly visible for 75% of playing time in a similar event. As a country dominated by sporting heroes, with a strong child based audience during televised times, the inclusion of unhealthy foods and alcohol sponsorship may indicate to children that even their most idolised sporting heroes support such unhealthy products.

Some children find it hard to grasp the concept of unhealthy products in the same way they have internalised the negative effects of smoking. Advertisements in Australia for tobacco smoking reflect the negative outcomes associated, through the use of graphic and gruesome images. Unhealthy food, in comparison, is not portrayed in the same light, despite the equality of consequences. Instead, commercials, billboards and television advertisements portray fast food and energy dense products with attractive colours and happy/ energetic staff members, persuading children to believe that high calorie junk food promotes a positive and rewarding experience.

=== Social Media ===
As technology and social media become more advanced and accessible, so does the increase in children utilising these content-sharing platforms. Randomised-controlled trials considered the link between social media and childhood obesity; where they believed eating whilst viewing social media, effects of influencers and advertising on social media impacts childhood obesity. Children are exposed to energy-dense food content such as meal ideas and specific food items which can shape young consumers' social norms about where, how and what food to eat on social media. Children under the age of 12 lack advertising literacy, their knowledge and understanding of advertising is not fully developed alongside their cognitive abilities. Studies have shown young people often idolise influencers, these influencers become role models to their young audience. Children may lack the knowledge to understand the reason behind their favourite influencers promoting a particular brand. Social media can be a channel for content creators to advertise energy-dense food products which shapes children's attitudes toward 'healthy' foods.

However, social media has negative impacts on children's eating habits. Trends and aesthetics have encouraged children to compare differences in body shape and weight with the content creators they engage with, and those who surround them such as fellow students. This then creates negative thoughts about what an ideal body is to them, leading dangerously to eating disorders. There have also been pro-anorexia trends where posts claim to encourage a 'healthy' lifestyle with strict eating, exercise routines and unrealistic body types.

Such views on childhood obesity relate to the anthropologic concept of subjectivities. Subjectivities are senses of identity that are constructed in relationship to a set of social norms. Social media can be a platform for diverse subjectivities on obesity, body ideals and food products to be expressed. Social media communities can then influence children's body image and health.

=== Cost and portion sizes ===
In this same manner, to entice children, the value of energy dense products has also decreased making these products cheaper and more available to younger adults. Despite the prices of these items being reduced, the portion sizes coincidentally have also risen, allowing individuals to pay less for more.

=== Transport ===
As a result of the radical development of technology over the past 30 years, individuals have adapted a less active mentality becoming increasingly more reliant on cars as a means of transport and succumbing to more sedentary behaviours. Individuals are more inclined to use a vehicle, bus or train as transportation as opposed to physically walking or riding a bike. This idle perspective that Australians are adopting is a clear contributor to the obesity epidemic. A study carried out in 2008 showing the relationship between walking and obesity in Europe, North America and Australia highlights that the countries with the highest levels of active transportation generally had the lowest obesity rates. The lowest rate of active transportation was seen in the United States (only 8%) and they also, coincidentally, had the highest rate of obesity (34.3%).

=== Sedentary behaviour ===
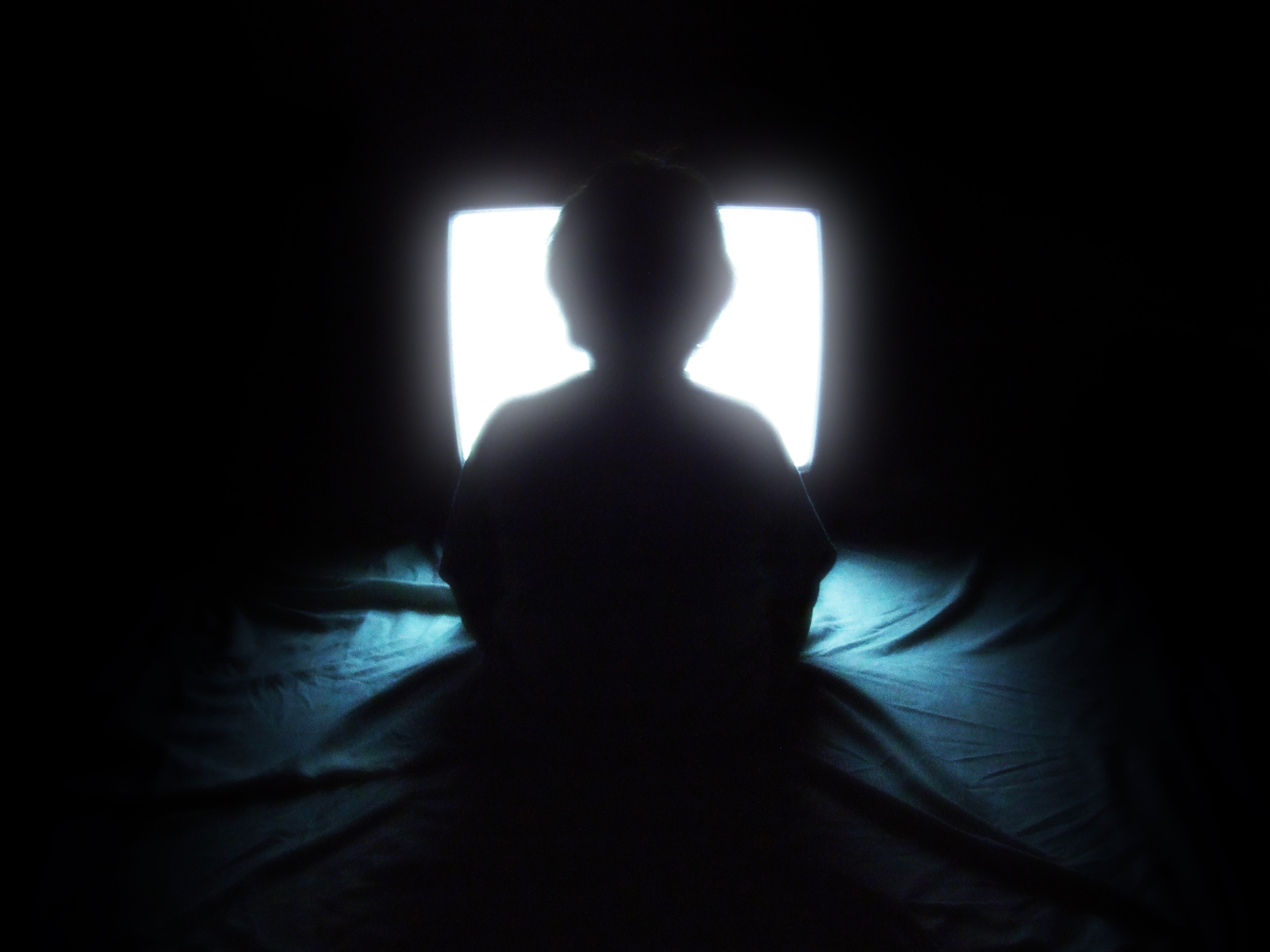
Children spend an unhealthy amount of time watching television.

Another contributor to the epidemic of childhood obesity has been the increase in sedentary pursuits. Sedentary behaviour includes the time spent using electronic media as a means of entertainment. Examples include: television, seated electronic games and computer use, including educational or non educational pursuits. The Australian Governments Department of Health recommends that children aged between 5–12 years should not be sedentary for more than two hours a day.

=== Socio-economic factors ===
The socio-economic status of individual families has also been said to be a related cause for overweight and obese individuals. Children who grow up in families who have a lower income are more likely to be obese compared to those who have a higher income and are therefore brought up in higher socio-economic environments. Lack of playground equipment, dangerous roads, and unsafe neighbourhoods are all factors that contribute to a lower level of physical activity.

The financial status of a family has also been reported to be a key influence in the physical well-being of children, as parents may not have the funds to support children in participating in extracurricular activities and physical activity in general. As a result of this, children are more inclined to spend their time partaking in sedentary activities such as watching television. Economic status is also shown to be a major contributor to obesity, as families tend to buy more affordable foods, those which are usually higher in fat and energy density.

Researchers suggest that individuals with a low income are more likely to become obese and those who are more financially stable, less likely. Causation behind this issue is founded on the prices of nutritional-based foods being more expensive thus directing funds towards cheaper and more calorie-dense options such as fast food and takeaway. The minority of the costs of healthy eating, however, firmly outweigh the economic burden that is placed on both the individual and society caused by diet-related chronic disease.

=== School environment ===
In order to decrease the prevalence of childhood obesity in Australia both parents and teachers must together develop techniques that best encourage healthy eating. In association to this, parents must also develop stronger understandings of the specific foods that will either benefit or prove unfavourable to their children's health. The establishment of in school programs that urge children to participate in physical activity is also imperative, introducing children to fun methods of exercising such as interactive games.

=== Intergenerational trauma and stress ===
Recent studies indicate that intergenerational trauma significantly contributes to childhood obesity, especially in underprivileged populations. The trauma, which has its origins in historical injustices such as institutional racism, colonisation, and chronic poverty, leads to ongoing constant conflict within families. Over time, these pressures give rise to environments in which unhealthy coping behaviours, including emotional eating, become prominent. Chronic stress disrupts the balance of cortisol, a hormone associated with appetite and the storage of fat, hence increasing the likelihood of obesity in children. The anthropological study emphasises that the circumstances in which these children are raised are frequently influenced by the same historical traumas. These situations are often defined by a lack of food security, restricted availability of nutritious food choices, and insufficient opportunity for vigorous physical activity. The interplay between environmental stressors and inherited psychological trauma generates an optimal condition for the onset of obesity.

Evidence of intergenerational trauma and stress concerning childhood obesity is found throughout Aboriginal children across Australia. Studies have shown that Indigenous children throughout history have been at a higher risk of being overweight or obese. A study from the Australian Aboriginal and Torres Strait Islander Health Survey, 2012–2013 highlighted that 11.8% of Aboriginal children aged 10–14 were obese, compared to 6.3% of non-aboriginal children being obese in Australia. Indigenous communities have been stripped away from their traditional lands, food sources and lifestyles, leaving them to adapt to a Westernised lifestyle and diet. Colonisation continues to play a factor in the living standards of First Nations people across Australia. Remote communities are often left to seek inexpensive and readily available fast food as healthy food options are frequently more expensive, Social inequality, food insecurity, inadequate access to healthcare, and education, financial stress and high crime rates are also factors in childhood obesity.

Understanding childhood obesity from the perspective of intergenerational trauma shifts the focus from personal responsibility to a more complex understanding of the interplay between biological, social, and historical factors. This perspective highlights how historical injustices and socioeconomic disadvantages create settings that contribute to obesity, challenging the widely held belief that obesity is only a result of personal choice. Trauma's repercussions can alter stress reactions and biological processes, resulting in actions and circumstances that make people more likely to become obese.

== Effects of obesity ==
=== Psychological ===
Short-term prospects for children in Australia suffering from a BMI of more than 25 kg/m^{2} include deteriorations in their physical health as well as a decreased psychological well-being. Children who are obese or overweight by the time they reach their schooling careers are likely to become victims of discrimination, bullying and teasing in the play ground. Individuals who are made to feel inferior for their physical appearance develop a self-conscious attitude towards their body image, leading them to foster feelings of depression, anxiety and incompetence.

Psychological detriments of this sort can also have a negative effect on children's ability to form relationships and make friends with peers. The social stigma surrounding the "perfect body image" can also be extremely degrading to adolescents who feel they are unable to meet the expectations of such situations causing further damage mentally and physically (anorexia and bulimia). From a long-term perspective obesity can also cause negative psychological effects on individuals who are discriminated and victimised in the work place. Food is also used as a psychological coping mechanism for overweight adults who indulge when they are feeling stressed, lonely and sad. The guilt felt as a result of this "mindless eating" can, in turn, cause people to feel anxious and distressed.

=== Repercussions of labelling obesity ===
Through the biomedical classification, BMI, obesity has been labelled as an 'epidemic'. These representations of obesity can lead to victim blaming and stigma, leading to low self-esteem, embarrassment, and isolation, ultimately impacting children's mental and physical health. Scheper-Hughes and Lock highlight that there is more to a body than what is presented in front of us, and they use the three bodies; individual, social, and body politics, to describe this. The experience of shame and stigma can be linked to the social body. It can be argued that obesity is a form of deviance from what is socially considered to be the 'normal' or healthy BMI. The notion of deviance suggests that it is the child's fault they are not the 'normal' body weight leaving room for others to make assumptions about their lifestyle choices, leading to victim blaming and stigma.

This focus on body weight and nutrition is known as the Weight-Centred Health Paradigm (WCHP). Recent research has suggested that emphasis should be placed on health and wellbeing. The Health at Every Size movement promotes health without manipulating body weight. Hegemony is evident throughout society that, those who appear slim set the standard of what all bodies should look like, anything that differs is seen as different. Society values looks rather than the actual health of individuals, including children. This creates the stereotype that those who do not fit the normative appearance are flawed. A focus on health rather than appearance or BMI could reduce the mental health impacts of obese children.

=== Physical ===
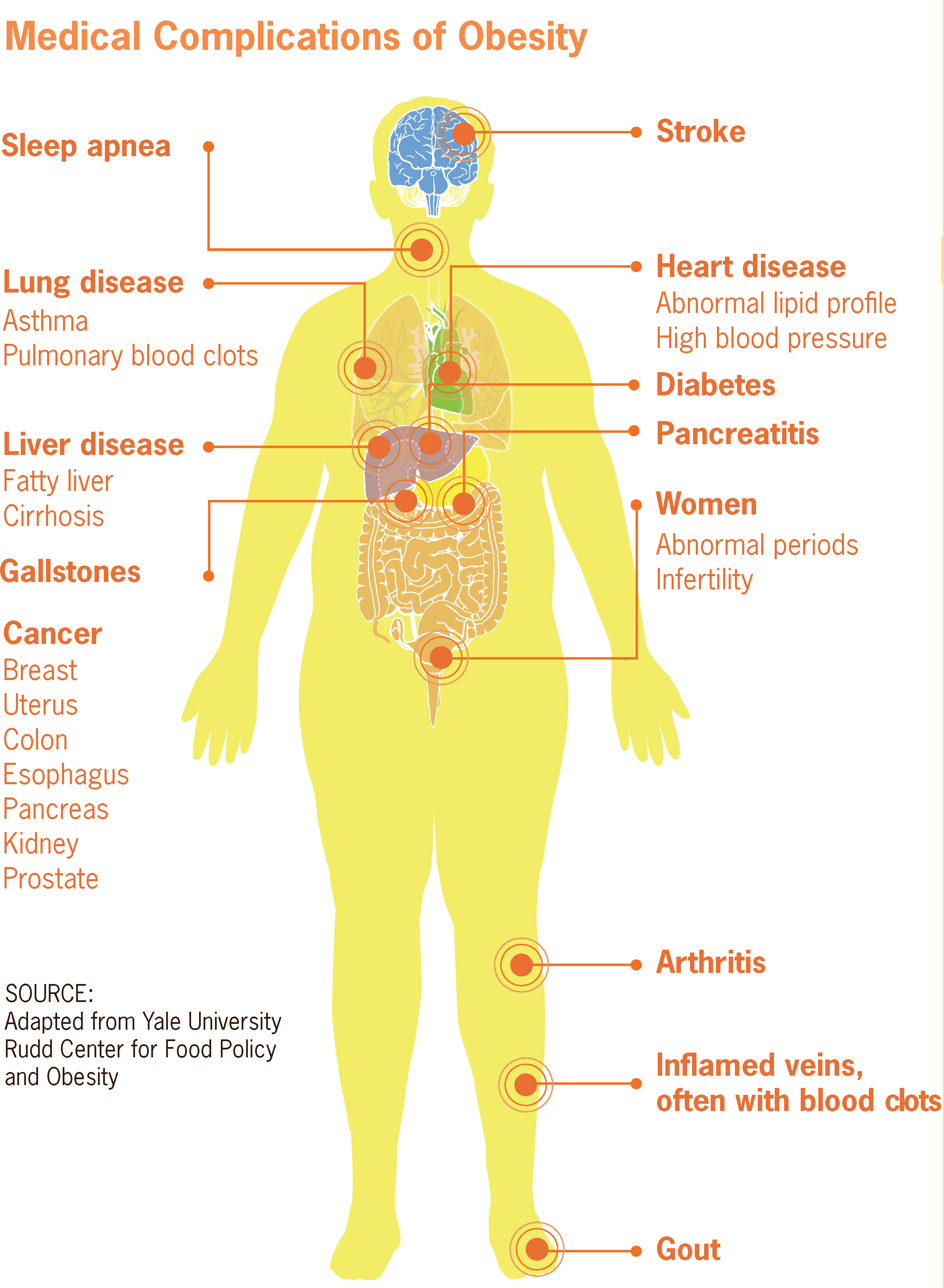
Obesity can effect the entire physical health of an individual in the long term.

The physical implications of obesity in children include sleep apnoea, breathlessness, a reduced tolerance to exercise and orthopaedic and gastrointestinal problems including non-alcoholic fatty liver disease. Children who reciprocate these physical health disadvantages tend to struggle to concentrate more in- school and find it harder to fit in, being marginalised due to the inability to partake in physical exercise. According to Dietitians Australia 25-50% of overweight or obese children with turn out to be obese as adults.

Long-term effects of obesity, therefore, include cardiovascular disease (hypertension and high blood pressure) and particular types of cancers in particular colon, kidney and breast cancer. Non-alcoholic fatty liver disease (NAFLD) is one of the most common risk factors associated with obesity being characterised as a buildup of fat within the liver cells. Musculoskeletal defects such as osteoarthritis are also said to have a strong link with obesity due to excessive amounts of weight being exerted on the joints. Individuals who have a BMI that is equal to or greater than 25 kg/m2 are also said to have an increased chance of premature morality.

=== Economic costs and consequences ===
As a result of the alarming statistics involving the number of obese children in Australia the consequences have also been extensive to the economy. Between the ages of 4–5 years the costs of childhood obesity, according to the Longitudinal Study of Australian Children, has incurred significantly higher medical and pharmaceutical bills. The health system comprised direct health care, indirect health care, and burden of disease costs was estimated at $58.2 billion in 2008. Direct costs included 4 main medical conditions: cardiovascular disease, type 2 diabetes, osteoarthritis and specific forms of cancer with in-direct costs referring to productivity loss (premature morality and sick days) and burden of disease, financial and social costs. In particular cardiovascular disease accounted for $34.6 billion, cancer, $9.7 billion, type 2 diabetes $8.3 billion and osteoarthritis $5.7 billion.

== Preventions/management/treatment ==
The two most common forms of treatment that are crucial for individuals to carry out to combat obesity include changing to a healthier diet and increasing their physical exercise. In extreme cases, if children are morbidly obese bariatric surgery may be carried out.

=== Dieting ===
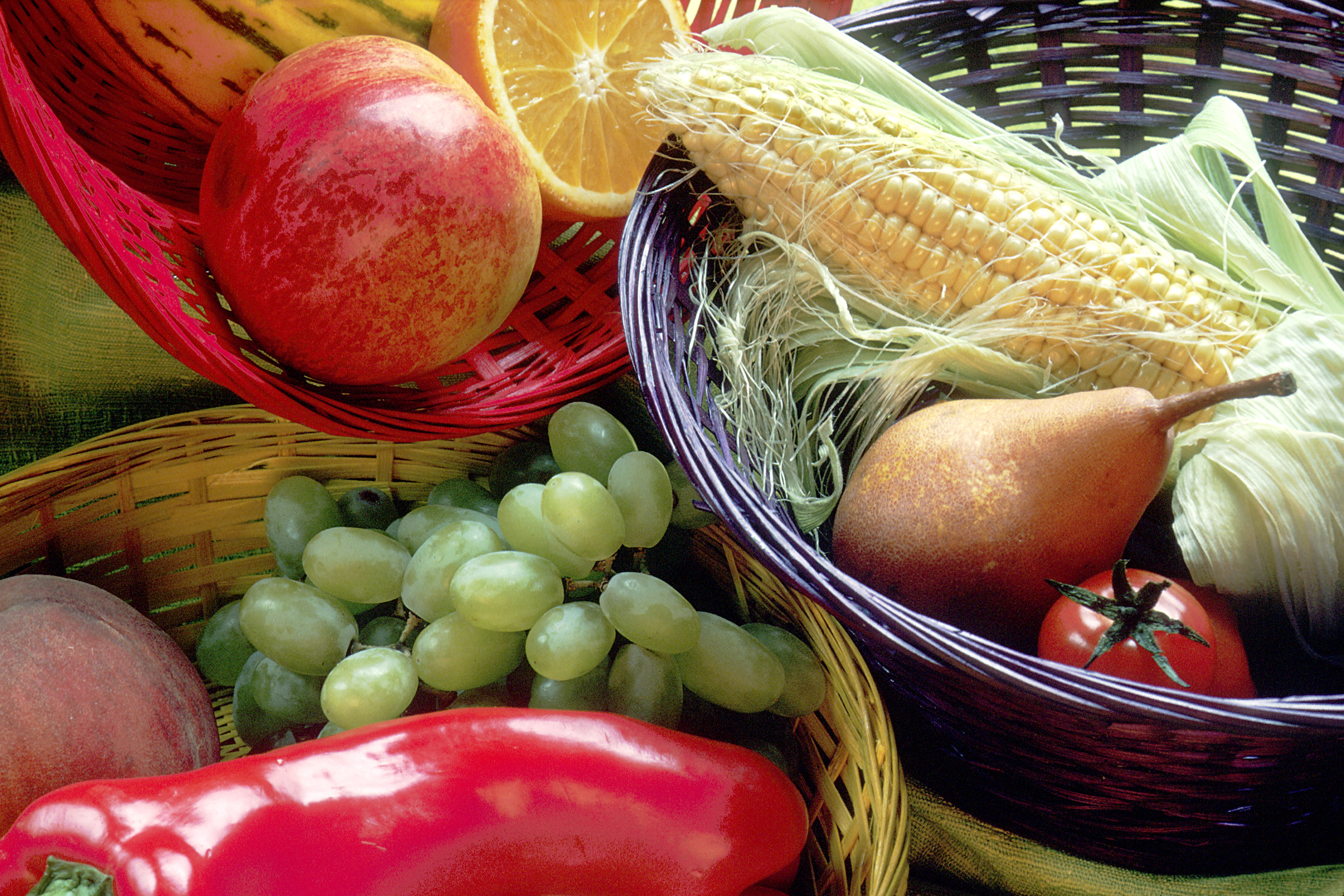
It is important for parents and teachers to encourage children to consume more fruits and vegetables.

In Australia, the "2 Fruit and 5 Veg" campaign is advertised to educate and encourage young children and adults of the necessary nutrients that are needed in a daily diet. For adults who are entirely responsible for the foods that their children consume, it is important that they are aware of the key strategies of a healthy regime. Adults should provide their children with a moderate to low fat diet by limiting the amount of energy dense meals they feed them, reiterate the importance of eating breakfast and encourage children to eat their vegetables. For young adolescents who have a BMI percentile of 80 or above, there are certain weight loss programs available that offer services specified in dietary advice and fitness coaching.

Parents and guardians staying informed about healthy eating can help reduce the risk of obesity for their children. Encouraging their children to eat nutritious foods and distinguish between high- and low-calorie pre-packaged snacks can further promote a healthy lifestyle.

The food industry also plays a huge part in promoting healthy foods as management from a dietary point of view. Methods include making wholesome foods widely available and affordable for their customers. Closely monitoring and managing the amount of fat, sugar and salt content that is in the foods that are sold is also important.

=== Physical exercise ===
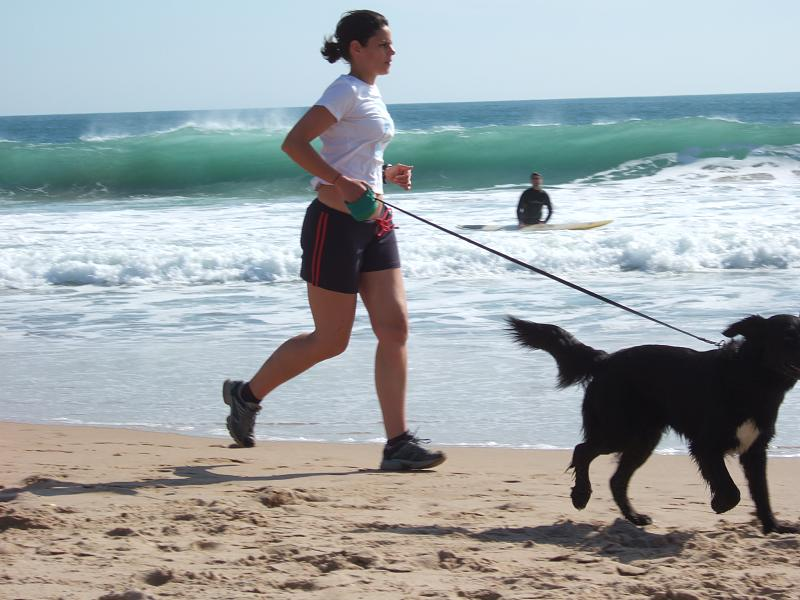
A key method of preventing obesity is physical exercise. The "Find 30" campaign reiterates the importance of exercising for at least 30 minutes a day in order to maintain a healthy lifestyle.

Physical exercise, in order for a child to maintain a healthy lifestyle, must be considered a fundamental aspect of their daily regime. The environment including both school and local neighbourhoods where children grow up are an important stimulus of physical activity. Sporting facilities, playgrounds and bike tracks are all encouraging features that influence the length of time a day that a child is physically active. The "Healthy Together Victoria" campaign run by St Pauls Primary in Mildura is a state government funded program that, according to World Health Organization worker Timothy Armstrong, is recognised worldwide with New Zealand, the United Kingdom and Canada all participating in similar exercises. The program in Victoria focuses on the health of its students by walking laps every morning and encouraging children to attend the healthy breakfast following, three times a week.

Another campaign that is run in Australia to educate and encourage individuals to regularly exercise is the "Find 30" initiative. Initially developed in 2008, the "find 30 every day" campaign encourages Australian candidates to participate in at least thirty minutes of moderate-intense physical activity as a bench mark for maintaining a healthy lifestyle.

=== Bariatric surgery ===
Although there are many short- term preventative methods in place to combat childhood obesity, there are some individuals who return to their initial base weight and therefore might turn to surgical measures to achieve a more lasting effect. Bariatric surgery is an effective procedure used to restrict the patients food intake and decrease absorption of food in the stomach and intestines. Procedures of this type are said to be able to reduce excess body weight of obese or overweight individuals by 50–75%, ultimately maintaining this weight loss for 16 years following.

== See also ==
- Obesity in Australia
