= HMS Acasta (H09) =

A-class destroyer

Coordinates: 68.75°N 4.5°E

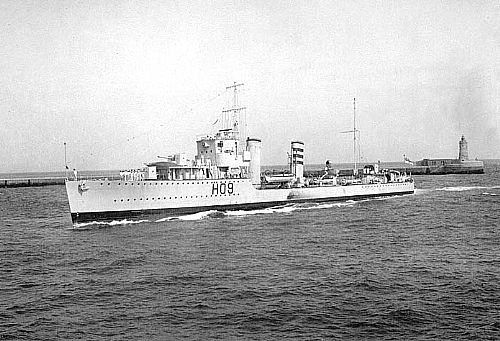
- Acasta, circa 1930

History

United Kingdom
- Name: Acasta
- Namesake: Acaste
- Builder: John Brown & Company, Clydebank
- Yard number: 525
- Laid down: 13 August 1928
- Launched: 8 August 1929
- Commissioned: 11 February 1930
- Fate: Sunk, 8 June 1940

General characteristics (as built)
- Class & type: A-class destroyer
- Displacement: 1,350 long tons (1,370 t) (standard); 1,773 long tons (1,801 t) (deep load)
- Length: 323 ft (98.5 m) (o/a)
- Beam: 32 ft 3 in (9.83 m)
- Draught: 12 ft 3 in (3.73 m)
- Installed power: 34,000 shp (25,000 kW); 3 × Admiralty 3-drum boilers
- Propulsion: 2 × shafts; 2 × geared steam turbines
- Speed: 35 knots (65 km/h; 40 mph)
- Range: 4,800 nmi (8,900 km; 5,500 mi) at 15 knots (28 km/h; 17 mph)
- Complement: 134; 143 (1940)
- Armament: 4 × single 4.7 in (120 mm) guns; 2 × single 2-pdr (40 mm) AA guns; 2 × quadruple 21 in (533 mm) torpedo tubes; 6 × depth charges, 3 chutes

HMS Acasta was one of eight A-class destroyers built for the Royal Navy (RN) in the 1920s. The ship spent most of the 1930s assigned to the Mediterranean Fleet. During the early months of the Spanish Civil War of 1936–1939, Acasta spent considerable time in Spanish waters enforcing the arms blockade imposed by Britain and France on both sides of the conflict.

At the beginning of the Second World War in September 1939, the ship was assigned convoy escort duties in the English Channel and the Western Approaches that lasted until April 1940 when the Germans invaded Norway. That month Acasta was transferred to the Home Fleet and supported Allied operations in Norway. Whilst escorting the aircraft carrier Glorious on 8 June 1940, she was sunk by the battleships Scharnhorst and Gneisenau, but not before badly damaging the former ship.

== Design and description ==
In the mid-1920s, the RN ordered two destroyers from two different builders, Ambuscade, built by Yarrow, and Amazon, built by Thornycroft, incorporating the lessons learned from World War I, as prototypes for future classes. The A-class destroyers were based on Amazon, slightly enlarged and carrying two more torpedo tubes. They displaced 1,350 long tons (1,370 t) at standard load and 1,773 long tons (1,801 t) at deep load. The ships had an overall length of 323 feet (98.5 m), a beam of 32 feet 3 inches (9.83 m) and a draught of 12 feet 3 inches (3.73 m). Acasta was powered by a pair of Brown-Curtis geared steam turbines, each driving one shaft, using steam provided by three Admiralty 3-drum boilers. The turbines developed a total of 34,000 shaft horsepower (25,000 kW) and gave a speed of 35 knots (65 km/h; 40 mph). During her sea trials, she reached a maximum speed of 35.5 knots (65.7 km/h; 40.9 mph) from 34,596 shp (25,798 kW). The ships carried enough fuel oil to give them a range of 4,800 nautical miles (8,900 km; 5,500 mi) at 15 knots (28 km/h; 17 mph). The complement of the A-class ships was 134 officers and ratings and increased to 143 by 1940.

Their main armament consisted of four QF 4.7-inch (120 mm) Mk IX guns in single mounts, in two superfiring pairs in front of the bridge and aft of the superstructure. For anti-aircraft (AA) defence, they had two 40-millimetre (1.6 in) QF 2-pounder Mk II AA guns mounted on a platform between their funnels. The ships were fitted with two above-water quadruple mounts for 21-inch (533 mm) torpedoes. Carrying the minesweeping paravanes on the quarterdeck limited depth charge chutes to three with two depth charges provided for each chute. The A-class destroyers were given space for an ASDIC system, but it was not initially fitted.

== Construction and career ==
Acasta was ordered on 6 March 1928 from John Brown & Company under the 1929 Naval Programme. She was laid down at their Clydebank, Scotland, shipyard on 13 August 1928, and launched on 8 August 1929, as the fourth ship of the name to serve in the RN. The ship was completed on 11 February 1930 at a cost of £227,621 excluding items supplied by the Admiralty such as guns, ammunition and communications equipment. Acasta was commissioned at Clydebank three days later and was assigned to the 3rd Destroyer Flotilla (DF) of the Mediterranean Fleet after working up.

The ship remained with the 3rd DF until 1937 aside from refits in HM Dockyard, Devonport (30 August–29 October 1932 and 29 April–3 July 1935). She also had a refit in Gibraltar between 24 November and 20 December 1933. Acasta accidentally collided with her flotilla leader, Codrington off Malta during an exercise on 12 June 1934 and was under repair until 27 July. The ship spent of her time between September 1936 and April 1937 aiding refugees and making non-intervention patrols in Spanish waters. She returned home at the end of that month and began a long refit at Devonport on 1 May that lasted until 11 April 1938 and included the installation of ASDIC. Acasta was then assigned to the 7th DF and served in Irish waters until beginning a refit at Devonport between 3 November and 17 January 1939. The ship was then assigned as the emergency destroyer for Plymouth and aided Vickers-Armstrongs in testing ASDIC equipment for the Argentinian light cruiser La Argentina over the period 2–13 March.

=== Wartime service ===
When the Second World War began in September 1939, Acasta was assigned to the 18th DF at Plymouth and escorted convoys in the English Channel until she was refitted again at Devonport between 20 December and 5 January 1940. The ship was then transferred to the Western Approaches and escorted a total of 22 convoys through April 1940. On 31 January 1940, she helped to escort the light cruiser Ajax into Plymouth on her return from her battle with the heavy cruiser Admiral Graf Spee.

After the German invasion of Norway on 9 April, Acasta was transferred to the Home Fleet. On 13 April, the ship joined the escort of Convoy NP1, on passage to Norway with troops for the planned landings at Narvik, but the convoy was diverted to Harstad. During 9–15 May, she escorted the badly damaged light cruiser Penelope to the Clyde for repairs after she struck a rock. On 31 May, the ship and the destroyers Ardent, Acheron, Highlander and Diana escorted the aircraft carriers Ark Royal and Glorious from the Clyde to the Norwegian coast to carry out air operations in support of the evacuation of Allied forces from Norway in Operation Alphabet. Acasta remained with the carriers' escort throughout early June.

Ardent and Acasta escorted Glorious back towards Scapa Flow on 8 June. En route, the three ships were spotted by Scharnhorst and Gneisenau at 15:46, which changed course to investigate. They were not spotted by the British until shortly after 16:00 and Ardent was ordered to identify the German ships while the other ships remained on course. She turned back to rejoin them before the Germans opened fire at 16:27 and was engaged by the 15-centimetre (5.9 in) secondary armament, mostly by Scharnhorst, while both ships fired at Glorious with their main batteries. Acasta remained with the carrier and began making smoke after the Germans opened fire, even opening fire herself although her guns lacked the range to reach the battleships. The destroyer was struck not long after she began laying smoke, but it had little effect. After the carrier was hit multiple times and began to list, Acasta left her and closed with the battleships to shorten the range for a torpedo attack. Now more visible to the battleships, she began to be hit more regularly. The first attack was unsuccessful, but one of the four torpedoes from the second attack blew a 39-foot (12 m) hole in Scharnhorst's hull at 17:34, flooding and disabling her starboard engine room. Acasta was then reduced to a blazing wreck and her captain, C. E. Glasfurd, ordered her crew to abandon ship. One of the gun crews delayed long enough to fire a shot that struck one of the Scharnhorst's main guns, but inflicted nothing more than shrapnel damage. The destroyer sank stern first around 18:20. Most of her crew died from exposure before the Norwegian merchant ship SS Borgund rescued two survivors from Acasta three days later, along with 36 men from Glorious. One of the men from Acasta later died of his wounds. All of the men saved by Borgund were set ashore at Tórshavn in the Faroe Islands on 13 June. Eight officers and 153 ratings were lost with Acasta or died of their wounds afterwards.
