= HMS Acheron (H45) =

A-class destroyer

Coordinates: 50°32′N 1°26′W

- HMS Acheron

History

United Kingdom
- Name: HMS Acheron
- Namesake: Acheron, a river in Greek mythology
- Ordered: 29 May 1928
- Builder: John I. Thornycroft & Company, Woolston, Hampshire
- Laid down: 29 October 1928
- Launched: 18 March 1930
- Commissioned: 13 October 1931
- Motto: "Post tenebras lux" (After darkness light)
- Fate: Sunk, 17 December 1940 after hitting a mine
- Badge: On a Field Black, barry wavy of 4 Silver.

General characteristics (as built)
- Class & type: A-class destroyer
- Displacement: 1,350 long tons (1,370 t) (standard); 1,773 long tons (1,801 t) (deep load)
- Length: 323 ft (98 m) (o/a)
- Beam: 32 ft 3 in (9.83 m)
- Draught: 12 ft 3 in (3.73 m)
- Installed power: 34,000 shp (25,000 kW); 3 × Thornycroft water-tube boilers
- Propulsion: 2 × shafts; 2 × geared steam turbines
- Speed: 35 knots (65 km/h; 40 mph)
- Range: 4,800 nmi (8,900 km; 5,500 mi) at 15 knots (28 km/h; 17 mph)
- Complement: 134; 140 (1940)
- Armament: 4 × single 4.7 in (120 mm) guns; 2 × single 2-pdr (40 mm) AA guns; 2 × quadruple 21 in (533 mm) torpedo tubes; 6 × depth charges, 3 chutes

HMS Acheron was an A-class destroyer of the Royal Navy. The ship was built by John I. Thornycroft & Company at their Woolston, Hampshire shipyard, and was launched on 18 March 1930, completing in October 1931. Acheron differed from other ships of her class in having experimental high pressure machinery, but this caused the ship to suffer mechanical problems throughout her career.

Between 1932 and 1936, Acheron served with the British Mediterranean Fleet, before returning to British waters where she was relegated to training duties. Acheron served during the Second World War in Home waters and off the Norwegian coast, before becoming an early war loss when she sank after hitting a mine off the Isle of Wight on 17 December 1940. The wreck site is designated under the Protection of Military Remains Act 1986.

== Design ==
The 1927 construction programme for the Royal Navy included orders for a destroyer leader (Codrington) and eight destroyers of the A-class, the first class of destroyers to be built for the Royal Navy since the end of the First World War, and a development of the prototype destroyers Amazon and Ambuscade. John I. Thornycroft & Company's destroyer, Acheron, was to have experimental high pressure machinery.

Acheron was 323 ft (98.45 m) long overall, 320 ft (97.54 m) at the waterline and 312 ft (95.10 m) between perpendiculars, with a beam of 32 ft 3 in (9.83 m) and a mean draught of 12 ft 3 in (3.73 m). Displacement was 1,350 long tons (1,370 t) standard and 1,773 long tons (1,801 t) full load. Three Thornycroft three-drum boilers fed steam at 500 psi (3,400 kPa) and 750 °F (399 °C; 672 K) to Parsons geared steam turbine, which drove two propeller shafts. The machinery was rated at 34,000 shp (25,000 kW), giving a speed of 35.25 kn (40.56 mph; 65.28 km/h). 345 t of oil was carried, giving a range of 4,080 nmi (4,700 mi; 7,560 km) at 15 kn (17 mph; 28 km/h).

As built, Acheron had a main gun armament of four QF 4.7-inch (120 mm) Mk IX guns in single mounts, in two superfiring pairs in front of the bridge and aft of the superstructure. These guns could only elevate to 30 degrees and so were only useful for surface fire. Anti-aircraft armament consisted of two 40-millimetre (1.6 in) QF 2-pounder Mk II 'pom-pom' autocannons, backed up by four .303 in (7.7 mm) machine guns. The ship was fitted with two above-water quadruple mounts for 21-inch (533 mm) torpedoes. The A-class were fitted with the Two-Speed Destroyer Sweep minesweeping equipment to allow sweeping ahead of the fleet at high speeds, which meant that the anti-submarine outfit was reduced, with three depth charge racks and six depth charges, The A-class destroyers were given space for an ASDIC system, but it was not initially fitted. The ship had a crew of 138 officers and other ranks.

== Construction and commissioning ==
Acheron was ordered on 29 May 1928 from Thornycroft's Woolston, Hampshire yard under the 1927 Naval Estimates. Acheron was laid down on 29 October 1928 and was launched a year later on 18 March 1930, with Katharine, Lady Parsons as sponsor. The destroyer was commissioned on 12 October 1931 for trials and completed the next day. She was the fifth ship named Acheron to serve with the Royal Navy.

== Service ==
=== Pre-war operations ===
Acheron suffered from a number of mechanical problems associated with her machinery, which persisted throughout the ship's career. These problems convinced the Admiralty not to continue with experiments with high boiler pressures, with later destroyer classes using conservative steam conditions. Trials of the ship and her machinery continued until June 1932, after which the destroyer underwent modifications. On 17 October 1932, five workmen were overcome by fumes when working in Acheron's engine room when the ship was at Portsmouth dockyard. The men were taken to Royal Hospital Haslar for recovery.

On 19 October 1932, Acheron recommissioned, joining the 3rd Destroyer Flotilla serving with the Mediterranean Fleet. The 3rd Flotilla returned to Britain in 1935, with Acheron undergoing defect repair at Portsmouth. Acheron's crew transferred to the old destroyer Wessex which replaced Acheron in the 3rd Destroyer Flotilla while the newer ship was being repaired. Acheron returned to the 3rd Flotilla to replace Wessex when her repairs were complete, again exchanging her crew with Wessex. Acheron's stay in the Mediterranean was short, however, as she returned to British waters in June 1936, undergoing a further series of full power sea trials before undergoing a refit at Portsmouth that lasted from July 1936 to February 1937.

On completion of the refit, Acheron was transferred to second-line duties, replacing Ambuscade as tender to HMS Vernon, the Royal Navy's torpedo school. From June to July 1937, Acheron was fitted with Asdic. On 1 November 1937, Acheron collided with a barge while leaving Portsmouth harbour. The destroyer received a 20 ft (6.1 m) tear above the waterline on her starboard side, and was under repair until 6 December. After repair, Acheron replaced Verity as emergency destroyer at Portsmouth. In March 1938, Acheron again returned to Portsmouth Dockyard for another refit and repairs to her turbines, these lasting until December that year. In January 1939, she replaced Windsor as a gunnery training destroyer with HMS Vernon. When the Second World War broke out in September 1939, she was under repair at Portsmouth.

=== Second World War ===
On completion of repairs, Acheron joined the 18th Destroyer Flotilla, carrying out local duties around Portsmouth until December 1939 when she underwent further machinery repairs at Portsmouth, which continued until 23 March 1940. The ship then joined the 16th Destroyer Flotilla of the Home Fleet, based at Scapa Flow. The flotilla was then deployed in the North Western Approaches and the North Sea. After the German invasion of Norway on 9 April 1940, Acheron was deployed with the flotilla on convoy defence and fleet screening duties in support of the military landings in Norway.

On 17 April, she and Arrow left Rosyth accompanying the cruisers Galatea, Arethusa, Carlisle and Curacoa, for Operation Sickle, the landing of troops from the 5th Leicestershire and 8th Sherwood Foresters at Åndalsnes and Molde. On arrival on the evening of 18 April, the two destroyers together with Galatea and Arethusa landed their troops at Åndalsnes, with the destroyers going alongside Galatea to disembark their troops, while the other two cruisers landed their troops at Molde. The landings were unopposed, and the force departed early on 19 April. On 24 April, Acheron, together with the destroyers Arrow and Griffin and the cruisers Birmingham, Manchester and York left Rosyth on another trooping and supply run to Åndalsnes, with the six ships carrying nearly 1600 men and 300 tons of stores. They arrived at the Romsdalsfjord on the evening of 26 April, and after finishing disembarkation, the destroyers and York set out for Britain, but encountered a suspicious trawler flying the Netherlands flag when leaving the fjord. When Arrow approached the trawler, which was actually the German Schelswig (Schiff 37), the trawler raised the German ensign and rammed Arrow, before being sunk by Arrow and Birmingham. Arrow was badly damaged by the collision, and Acheron and Griffin were tasked with escorting her back to home. They encountered another German trawler, Schiff 26 (ex-Julius Pickenpack), which was captured by a boarding party from Griffin and taken back to Scapa Flow. From 30 April 1940, Acheron, together with the destroyers Antelope and Beagle was part of the escort for the aircraft carrier Glorious which joined up with the carrier Ark Royal on 1 May to help to cover the evacuation of Allied troops from central Norway (Åndalsnes, Molde and Namsos). Acheron returned to Scapa Flow with the two carriers on 3 May, before departing later that day to reinforce the escort for the evacuation convoy from Namsos.

On 31 May, Acheron, Acasta, Ardent, Highlander and Diana escorted the carriers Glorious and Ark Royal to Norway to cover the final evacuation of British troops from Norway (Operation Alphabet). Acheron, together with Diana and Highlander, remained with Ark Royal after the embarkations had been completed on 8 June, with the carrier and her escort accompanying one of the convoys carrying troops back to Britain. Acheron then resumed her normal duties with the flotilla. She then operated in the English Channel to escort convoys.

On 21 June, as part of an emergency programme to improve the anti-aircraft capabilities of the Royal Navy's destroyers as a result of lessons leaned from the Norwegian campaign, Acheron had her aft bank of torpedo tubes replaced by a 3 in (76 mm) AA gun. Whilst sailing 10 mi (16 km) south off St. Catherine's Point on 20 July, she was attacked by German dive bombers, and was damaged by nine near misses. She began repairs at Portsmouth Dockyard on 6 August, but on 24 August she was alongside, with the destroyer Bulldog berthed outside Acheron, when Portsmouth Dockyard came under air attack. Acheron was near missed by three bombs and hit by one bomb that hit her aft section. The bomb caused severe damage to her steering gear, "Y" gun and hull plating. Two of Acheron's crew were killed and another three injured. Bulldog, lying outside Acheron, received minor damage from bomb splinters. The damage received in this attack caused Acheron's repairs to be extended until December, with her "Y" gun being replaced by a mounting from the destroyer Boadicea, which had been damaged in June. In November, Acheron was nominated for service as gunnery training destroyer.

=== Sinking ===
Repairs were fully completed by 2 December 1940, and Acheron began post-refit trials. Early on 17 December, Acheron left Portsmouth to carry out steaming trials in the English Channel, making runs over a measured mile off the Isle of Wight. It was still dark and Acheron was starting her second run over the trials course when she struck a mine. The explosion caused a fire forward and a heavy list, and the destroyer settled bows first, sinking within five minutes. 167 of the ship's crew were killed, together with 25 dockyard workers. There were only 19 survivors.

Acheron's sinking was not made public until 26 December 1940.

The wreck site, about 5 nmi (5.8 mi; 9.3 km) south of St. Catherine's Point, was discovered in April 1984. It was designated as a Protected Place under the Protection of Military Remains Act 1986 in 2006.
