= HMS Arrow (H42) =

A-class destroyer

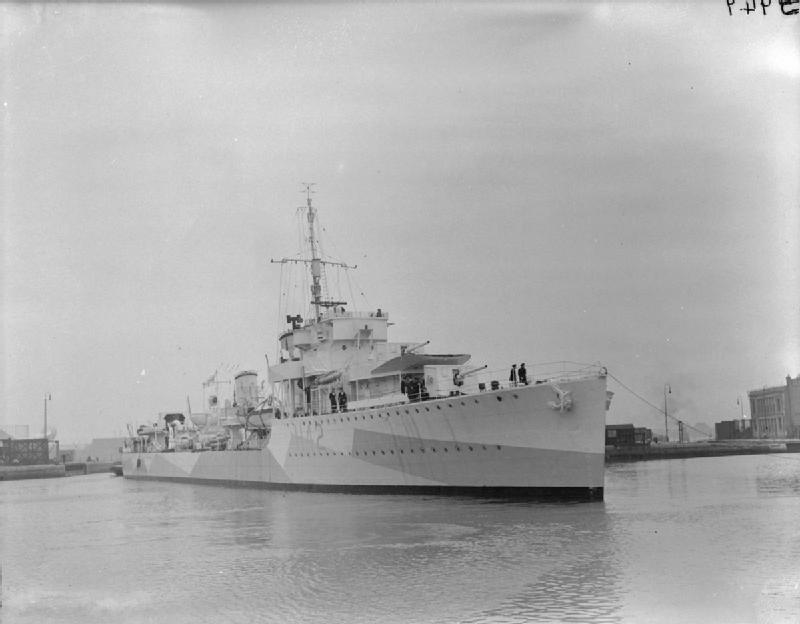
- Arrow in May 1943

History

United Kingdom
- Name: Arrow
- Ordered: 6 March 1928
- Builder: Vickers-Armstrongs, Barrow-in-Furness
- Laid down: 20 August 1928
- Launched: 22 August 1929
- Commissioned: 14 April 1930
- Motto: Celeriter Qerus : 'Swiftly sure'
- Fate: Damaged on 4 August 1943 and written off as a constructive total loss
- Badge: On a Field Green two arrows Gold, feathered Red.

General characteristics (as built)
- Class & type: A-class destroyer
- Displacement: 1,350 long tons (1,370 t) (standard); 1,773 long tons (1,801 t) (deep load)
- Length: 323 ft (98 m) (o/a)
- Beam: 32 ft 3 in (9.83 m)
- Draught: 12 ft 3 in (3.73 m)
- Installed power: 34,000 shp (25,000 kW); 3 × Admiralty 3-drum boilers
- Propulsion: 2 × shafts; 2 × geared steam turbines
- Speed: 35 knots (65 km/h; 40 mph)
- Range: 4,800 nmi (8,900 km; 5,500 mi) at 15 knots (28 km/h; 17 mph)
- Complement: 134; 140 (1940)
- Armament: 4 × single 4.7 in (120 mm) guns; 2 × single 2-pdr (40 mm) AA guns; 2 × quadruple 21 in (533 mm) torpedo tubes; 6 × depth charges, 3 chutes

HMS Arrow was an A-class destroyer of the Royal Navy, built by Vickers-Armstrongs at their Barrow-in-Furness between 1928 and 1930, being launched on 22 August 1929. Arrow served in the Mediterranean Fleet in the 1930s, rescuing refugees and taking part in neutrality patrols during the Spanish Civil War.

Arrow served during the Second World War before being damaged while fighting a fire on an ammunition ship and written off in 1943.

== Construction and commissioning ==
Arrow was ordered on 6 March 1928 under the 1927 Naval Estimates. She was laid down on 20 August 1928 at the yards of Vickers-Armstrongs, Barrow-in-Furness, as Yard No 642. She was launched on 22 August 1929, reaching a speed of 36.7 kn (42.2 mph; 68.0 km/h) during a six-hour run during sea trials. The ship was completed on 14 April 1930. Arrow was the sixth ship of that name to serve with the Royal Navy. She was adopted by the civil community of the Rural District of Blackwell, Derbyshire in February 1942 following a successful Warship Week National Savings Campaign.

== Career ==
=== Peacetime operations ===
Following commissioning, Arrow joined the 3rd Destroyer Flotilla of the Mediterranean Fleet where she served until 1937. The ship returned to the UK for turbine repairs at Chatham Dockyard in March 1931, with these repairs continuing until July that year. Arrow was refitted again at Chatham in August to October 1932, and at Malta between October 1933 and January 1934. On 20 February 1934, during night manoeuvres off Malta, Arrow's engineer officer fell overboard from Arrow and drowned. Arrow was refitted again, at Sheerness Dockyard, from April to June 1935.

In July 1936, the Spanish Civil War broke out. The Royal Navy was employed in evacuating British subjects from Spanish ports during the early part of the war, and on 1 October 1936, Arrow embarked 118 refugees from Málaga and ferried them to safety in Gibraltar. On 20 April 1937, Arrow arrived at Málaga from Gibraltar, to monitor shipping on behalf of the International Non-Intervention Committee and to deliver a cargo of food aid. On 23 April, following protests from the Nationalist authorities, Arrow left Málaga harbour and maintained a patrol outside the three-mile limit. On 24 April, the Republican destroyers Lepanto and Sánchez Barcáiztegui attacked Málaga, with Arrow taking avoiding action in response to return fire from Nationalist coast defences.

Arrow left the Mediterranean later that month, and was refitted at Sheerness, when the ship was fitted with Asdic. In July that year, following completion of the refit, Arrow entered reserve at Sheerness, and in March 1938, commissioned into the local destroyer flotilla at Portsmouth.

=== Escort duties ===
On the outbreak of the Second World War, Arrow joined the 18th Destroyer Flotilla, based at Portland, and tasked with anti-submarine patrol and convoy defence duties. On 24 October 1939, she put into Devonport Dockyard to undergo repairs for recurring defects with her turbines. On return to service on 10 January 1940, Arrow joined the 16th Destroyer Flotilla, based at Portsmouth, but on 30 January she returned to Devonport for further work on her turbines, which continued until 9 March 1940.

=== The Norwegian coast ===
On 9 April 1940, Germany invaded Norway. On 17 April 1940, Arrow left Rosyth in company with sister ship Acheron and the cruisers Arethusa, Carlisle, Curacoa and Galatea, carrying troops of the 148th Infantry Brigade to Åndalsnes, Norway, as part of Operation Sickle. The force arrived at their destination on 18 April, with Carlisle, Galatea and the two destroyers landing their troops directly at Åndalsnes, while Arethusa and Curacoa disembarked their troops at nearby Molde, with the landings completed by 19 April. On 22 April, Arrow transferred to the 12th Destroyer Flotilla of the Home Fleet. Arrow sailed again on 24 April, in company with the cruisers Birmingham Manchester and York, and the destroyers Acheron and Griffin with more troops and stores for Åndalsnes. Manchester landed her troops at Molde, while the other ships went to Åndalsnes, with the destroyers ferrying troops and stores from the cruisers to the shore as well as landing their own troops. On 26 April Arrow was leaving the Romsdalsfjord when she encountered a trawler flying the Dutch flag. Arrow approached the trawler, which was in fact the German Schleswig (Schiff 37), which raised the German ensign and rammed Arrow, holing the destroyer above the waterline. Schleswig was then engaged by Arrow and the cruiser Birmingham and sank by the latter. A second German trawler, Schiff 26 (ex-Julius Pickenpack) was then captured by Griffin. Arrow was escorted back to Britain by Acheron and was taken in hand on 29 April by a commercial shipyard at Middlesbrough.

Arrow was back in service by 13 May, and on 22 May, while patrolling with Fortune, spotted a suspected periscope, with Fortune carrying out a depth charge attack on what was later concluded to be a false alarm. From 29 to 31 May Arrow took part with the destroyers Echo, Firedrake, Havelock and Vanoc in an evacuation of troops from Mo and Bodø. The troops were taken to Harstad in preparation for their final evacuation from Norway. On 7 June, as part of the final evacuation from Norway (Operation Alphabet), Arrow, with the sloop Stork and ten trawlers, (Note: and the destroyer Veteran according to Rohwer.) a slow convoy of eight storeships from Harstad. On 9–10 June, the convoy came under air attack, which was repelled without loss, but at the same time, the Norwegian passenger ships Ariadne and Prins Olav, which were heading for Tórshavn in the Faroe Islands, and were nearby, were attacked and sunk by German aircraft. When the attacks on the convoy had ended, Arrow was detached from the convoy and rescued about 80 survivors from the two ships.

=== The Western Approaches ===
On 26 June, Arrow started a short refit at Sheerness, where her armament was modified. She rejoined the 16th Destroyer Flotilla, now based at Harwich on 4 July, but on 24 July she was transferred to the Western Approaches Defence Force, based at Greenock. She was deployed on convoy defence duties in the North Western Approaches and on 16 August she and Achates attacked a U-boat that had been sighted by the armed merchant cruiser Cheshire. On 27 August Arrow rescued survivors from a Greek steamer and on 13 September she rescued survivors from the Greek merchant vessel SS Poseidon. On 8 October she joined the fast military convoy WS-3 in the Clyde as an escort, along with the cruiser Kenya and the destroyers Achates, Sabre and Vimy, covering the convoy's passage through the North Western Approaches. Arrow and the escorting destroyers were detached on 12 October and returned to the Clyde, where they resumed convoy defence duties for Iceland convoys. Kenya remained with the convoy as far as Freetown.

On 13 November Arrow rescued survivors from the merchant vessel SS Empire Hind, which had been sunk by an air attack in the North Atlantic. On 14 November she stood by the tanker MV San Demetrio off Achill Head and escorted her into the Clyde. San Demetrio had been attacked by the German cruiser Admiral Scheer on 5 November, but after initially abandoning the then-burning ship the crew had re-boarded her to ensure the salvage of her valuable cargo. They arrived in the Clyde on 16 October, and Arrow entered repair at the Barclay Curle shipyard the following day, to fix her machinery. She was not back in action again until 14 January 1941, when she rejoined the Home Fleet. She joined the 3rd Destroyer Flotilla for anti-submarine defence of convoys the following day. February saw Arrow deployed in the North Western Approaches and the North Sea, escorting Icelandic convoys from Aberdeen, Scapa Flow and the Clyde.

=== Repairs and mining ===
She joined the military convoy WS-7 in the Clyde on 24 March, as an escort with the battleship Nelson, during the convoy's Atlantic passage to Freetown. She and Nelson were detached on 4 April and returned to Scapa Flow. During this time, she developed problems with her boilers that required attention. She put into Chatham for a refit on 2 May and was withdrawn from operational service whilst her boilers were re-tubed. The work was completed by June and she sailed to rejoin the Fleet. On 21 June, whilst on passage to Scapa Flow she detonated a mine off Flamborough Head and had to put into Middlesbrough on one boiler. She was taken in hand by Smiths Dock on 22 June for repairs that lasted until October and involved repairing her repair machinery mountings and replacing bulkheads. During this time she was nominated for foreign service, and after carrying out post repair trials she was prepared for service in the Eastern Mediterranean.

=== Transfer to the Mediterranean ===
On 18 November, Arrow and the destroyers Gurkha, Zulu, Foxhound and the Australian HMAS Nestor screened the cruiser Dido on passage to Gibraltar, where they arrived on 21 November. The same ships left the next day for Malta, where they arrived on 24 November. On 26 November they joined the cruiser Ajax and the destroyers Lance and Lively as an escort for convoy ME-8 to Alexandria. The ships arrived at Alexandria on 29 November, where Arrow and the other escorts joined the Mediterranean Fleet.

January 1942 saw her deploying out of Alexandria, where on 12 January she was the target of a failed attack by an enemy submarine. Arrow then carried out an unsuccessful search for her attacker with fellow destroyer Hero. On 24 January she formed part of the escort for the Malta convoy MF-4. She sailed for Alexandria on 26 January after the escorting of Breconshire was transferred to the cruiser Penelope and the destroyers Lively, Legion, Maori and Zulu of Force K. Arrow made her return passage on 27 January with Force B, which was escorting Convoy ME-9, which had come from Malta with Force K. Arrow and the convoy arrived at Alexandria on 28 January.

On 12 February she joined the screen for the cruisers Naiad, Dido and Euryalus with the destroyers Griffin, Hasty, Havock, Jaguar, Jervis, Kelvin and Kipling, providing cover for the passage of the convoys MW-9 and MW-9A through the Eastern Mediterranean. They came under heavy and sustained air attacks on 13 February, during which the merchant Clan Campbell was badly damaged and had to be under escort to Tobruk. The attacks continued throughout 14 February and another member of the convoy, Clan Chattan, had to be abandoned after she caught fire. The escorting force then turned over the escort of MW-9 to Force K, which took the merchants on to Malta, whilst they took over the escort of Breconshire and three merchants of convoy ME-10 from Force K and escorted them into Alexandria. They arrived in port on 15 February. In March Arrow was transferred to the Indian Ocean to reinforce the Eastern Fleet.

=== With the Eastern Fleet ===
She joined the Eastern Fleet at Gan on 4 April, where she was deployed as a screen for the battleships Ramillies, Royal Sovereign, Resolution and Revenge, the aircraft carrier Hermes, the cruisers Caledon, Dragon and the Dutch HNLMS Jacob van Heemskerck and the destroyers Fortune, Griffin, Decoy, Scout, the Australian HMAS Norman and HMAS Vampire, and the Dutch HNLMS Isaac Sweers as Force B. Arrow was transferred on 6 April with Force B to Kilindini, after the loss of Hermes, and the Japanese air attacks on Ceylon. Arrow deployed on 15 April, providing anti-submarine protection for convoys sailing between Madagascar and the Cape of Good Hope. She was withdrawn from active service on 20 May after suffering a series of defects, and was taken in hand at Durban on 21 May for a refit.

She resumed her duties on 2 July, and spent August escorting convoys between the Cape of Good Hope and Madagascar. In September she was nominated to support the final occupation of Madagascar. She joined the destroyers Active, Blackmore and Inconstant in the 3rd Destroyer Division of Force M. On 9 September they provided the escort for the ships of Force M, and covered the landings at Majunga. She was released from the operation on 30 September and was transferred to Freetown, West Africa for convoy defence duties in the South Atlantic. She took up her position there in October, and on 8 October she deployed off Cape Town with Active and Foxhound on anti-submarine search operations, and rescuing survivors from sunken mercantiles. She was again withdrawn from service in November owing to a recurrence of machinery defects. She returned to the UK and was under repair in a commercial shipyard at Middlesbrough from 18 November. These repairs lasted until March 1943, and she returned to Scapa Flow on 26 March for working up. She struck the boom defences on 10 April whilst working up and had to head for London on 11 April for repairs. She was taken in hand on 13 March by Green and Silley Weir at Blackwall. She was under repair until May, when she returned to Scapa Flow on 30 May for working up.

=== Gibraltar and Sicily ===
Having started working up on 3 June, she was assigned to serve with the 13th Destroyer Flotilla at Gibraltar. The working up was completed by 14 June and on 21 June she joined the destroyers Blankney, Blencathra, Brecon, Brissenden, Hambledon, Ledbury, Mendip, Viscount, Wallace, Witherington and Woolston in the Clyde as the escort for the joint convoys KMF-17 to Gibraltar and the military convoy WS-31 to the Middle East and India. Arrow was detached with the ships of KMF-17 on 26 June when the destroyer escort for WS-31 to Freetown arrived from Gibraltar. She then escorted the ships of KMF-17 to Gibraltar with the same destroyers and then joined the Flotilla on arrival. In July she was nominated for duty with Support Force East during the planned landings in Sicily. She took part in the landings on 10 July with the support force, and was then deployed to escort the follow-up convoys.

== Damage and scrapping ==
Whilst in harbour at Algiers on 4 August Arrow was set on fire by the explosion of the merchant ship Fort La Montee. She sustained heavy damage, suffered many casualties and ended up disabled. She was towed to Gibraltar, arriving there on 18 September to undergo repairs. Temporary repairs were carried out throughout October, before she was towed to Taranto for permanent repairs. She left Gibraltar on 19 November, arriving at Taranto on 27 November. A survey was carried out in December to assess the extent of work required, and January to September 1944 was spent under repair. As the repairs continued, the state of the ship was found to be increasingly unsatisfactory, and her future use was now under consideration. On 17 October it was decided that repair work was to be suspended and the ship was to be de-equipped. This was carried out by December, and by January 1945 the ship was a hulk at Taranto. She remained there until May 1949, when she was broken up. Her bell hangs at the Sheldon Pavilion at Downside School.
