= HMS Ardent (H41) =

A-class destroyer ship

Coordinates: 68°45′N 4°30′E

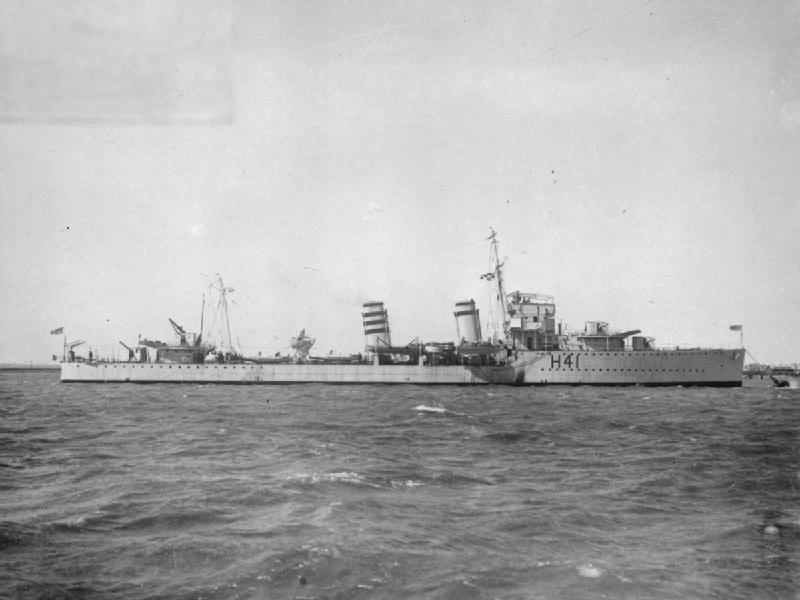
- HMS Ardent in 1930

History

United Kingdom
- Name: Ardent
- Ordered: 6 March 1928
- Builder: Scotts Shipbuilding and Engineering Company, Greenock, Scotland
- Laid down: 30 July 1928
- Launched: 26 June 1929
- Commissioned: 14 April 1930
- Identification: Pennant number: H41
- Fate: Sunk, 8 June 1940

General characteristics (as built)
- Class & type: A-class destroyer
- Displacement: 1,350 long tons (1,370 t) (standard); 1,773 long tons (1,801 t) (deep load)
- Length: 323 ft (98.5 m) (o/a)
- Beam: 32 ft 3 in (9.83 m)
- Draught: 12 ft 3 in (3.73 m)
- Installed power: 34,000 shp (25,000 kW); 3 × Yarrow boilers
- Propulsion: 2 × shafts; 2 × geared steam turbines
- Speed: 35 knots (65 km/h; 40 mph)
- Range: 4,800 nmi (8,900 km; 5,500 mi) at 15 knots (28 km/h; 17 mph)
- Complement: 134; 143 (1940)
- Armament: 4 × single 4.7 in (120 mm) guns; 2 × single 2-pdr (40 mm) AA guns; 2 × quadruple 21 in (533 mm) torpedo tubes; 6 × depth charges, 3 chutes

HMS Ardent was one of eight A-class destroyers built for the Royal Navy (RN) in the 1920s. The ship spent most of the 1930s assigned to the Mediterranean Fleet. During the early months of the Spanish Civil War of 1936–1939, Ardent spent considerable time in Spanish waters enforcing the arms blockade imposed by Britain and France on both sides of the conflict.

At the beginning of the Second World War in September 1939, the ship escorted aircraft carriers before she was transferred to the Western Approaches for convoy escort duties that last until April 1940 when the Germans invaded Norway. That month Ardent was transferred to the Home Fleet and supported Allied operations in Norway. Whilst escorting the carrier Glorious, she was sunk by the battleships Scharnhorst and Gneisenau on 8 June 1940.

== Description ==
In the mid-1920s, the RN ordered two destroyers from two different builders, Ambuscade, built by Yarrow, and Amazon, built by Thornycroft, incorporating the lessons learned from World War I, as prototypes for future classes. The A-class destroyers were based on Amazon, slightly enlarged and carrying two more torpedo tubes. They displaced 1,350 long tons (1,370 t) at standard load and 1,773 long tons (1,801 t) at deep load. The ships had an overall length of 323 feet (98.5 m), a beam of 32 feet 3 inches (9.83 m) and a draught of 12 feet 3 inches (3.73 m). Ardent was powered by a pair of Parsons geared steam turbines, each driving one shaft, using steam provided by three Yarrow boilers. The turbines developed a total of 34,000 shaft horsepower (25,000 kW) and gave a speed of 35 knots (65 km/h; 40 mph). During her sea trials, she reached a maximum speed of 35.9 knots (66.5 km/h; 41.3 mph) from 34,376 shp (25,634 kW). The ships carried enough fuel oil to give them a range of 4,800 nautical miles (8,900 km; 5,500 mi) at 15 knots (28 km/h; 17 mph). The complement of the A-class ships was 134 officers and ratings and increased to 143 by 1940.

Their main armament consisted of four QF 4.7-inch (120 mm) Mk IX guns in single mounts, in two superfiring pairs in front of the bridge and aft of the superstructure. For anti-aircraft (AA) defence, they had two 40-millimetre (1.6 in) QF 2-pounder Mk II AA guns mounted on a platform between their funnels. The ships were fitted with two above-water quadruple mounts for 21-inch (533 mm) torpedoes. Carrying the minesweeping paravanes on the quarterdeck limited depth charge chutes to three with two depth charges provided for each chute. The A-class destroyers were given space for an ASDIC system, but it was not initially fitted.

== Construction and career ==
Ardent was ordered on 6 March 1928 from Scotts Shipbuilding and Engineering Company under the 1929 Naval Programme. She was laid down at their Greenock, Scotland, shipyard on 30 July 1928, and launched on 26 June 1929, as the seventh ship of the name to serve in the RN. The ship was completed on 14 April 1930 at a cost of £226,439 excluding items supplied by the Admiralty such as guns, ammunition and communications equipment. Ardent was commissioned at HM Dockyard, Chatham on 23 April and was assigned to the 3rd Destroyer Flotilla of the Mediterranean Fleet after working up, departing on 19 May.

The ship was deployed throughout June to October, but had more than a few maintenance problems during that time. She was ordered to the Royal Dockyard at Malta on 31 October to undergo repairs that did not begin until 1 December. Later that month, Ardent was paid off and reduced to the reserve. She recommissioned on 4 November and rejoined the flotilla. On 8 September 1936, during the Spanish Civil War, Ardent was deployed on non-intervention patrols off the Spanish coast, returning to Malta on 17 October. The ship resumed her Spanish patrols on 29 November and served as the Senior Naval Officer's ship at Barcelona. She then returned to the UK in April 1937 and began a long refit at HM Dockyard, Sheerness on 14 April.

The refit lasted until 20 April 1938 and included the installation of ASDIC. Ardent was then assigned as the Devonport emergency destroyer; on 24 September her crew was brought up to strength during the Munich crisis. On 11 October her complement was reduced to its normal strength and the ship began a brief refit at HM Dockyard, Devonport on 17 October. The ship was back in service on 15 November and Ardent served as a boys' training ship at Devonport for a short time before beginning another refit that was not completed until 23 August 1939. The ship was then assigned to the 18th Destroyer Flotilla at Portland as part of the Channel Force.

=== Wartime service ===
When Britain declared war on Germany on 3 September, Ardent was one of the escorts for the aircraft carrier Courageous as her aircraft searched for U-boats in the Western Approaches. In October, she was transferred to the Western Approaches Command and escorted 17 convoys through April 1940. On 31 January 1940, Ardent joined the destroyer Whitshed in escorting the light cruiser Ajax into Plymouth on her return from her battle with the heavy cruiser Admiral Graf Spee.

After the German invasion of Norway on 9 April, she was transferred to the Home Fleet. On 13 April, the ship joined the escort of Convoy NP1, on passage to Norway with troops for the planned landings at Narvik. Diverted to Harstad, Ardent helped to unload the troops on 5–16 April. On the night of 29/30 April, Ardent and the Polish destroyer Błyskawica ferried 150 men of the Scots Guards to Bodø. In early May, the ship damaged her ASDIC dome and had to return to the UK for repairs on 6–19 May. Three days later, she escorted the troopship HMT Ulster Prince as she took troops to the Faroe Islands to replace the Royal Marines that had been landed there in April as part of Operation Valentine and arrived back in Greenock on the 29th. On 31 May, the ship and the destroyers Acasta, Acheron, Highlander and Diana escorted the aircraft carriers Ark Royal and Glorious from the Clyde to the Norwegian coast to carry out air operations in support of the evacuation of Allied forces from Norway in Operation Alphabet. Ardent remained with the carriers' escort throughout early June.

Ardent and Acasta escorted Glorious back towards Scapa Flow on 8 June. En route, the three ships were spotted by Scharnhorst and Gneisenau at 15:46, which changed course to investigate. They were not spotted by the British until shortly after 16:00 and Ardent was ordered to identify the German ships while the other ships remained on course. She turned back to rejoin them before the Germans opened fire at 16:27. The destroyer was engaged by the 15-centimetre (5.9 in) secondary armament, mostly by Scharnhorst, while both ships fired at Glorious with their main batteries. Ardent was hit in the first salvo in her forward boiler room which reduced her speed. The ship zigzagged to evade the German shells and laid a smoke screen to hide herself. She made repeated torpedo attacks whenever she emerged from the smoke, but they were all evaded by Scharnhorst. Ardent also fired her 4.7-inch guns and made one hit, which proved to be insignificant. She was not seriously damaged until she emerged from the smoke at 17:01 and was repeatedly hit, losing speed and on fire as the ship turned away. She narrowly missed Scharnhorst with a torpedo at 17:13 before she capsized shortly after 17:25. Only two of Ardent's survivors remained to be picked up by a German seaplane five days after the sinking. One of the two later died from exposure, the other was eventually repatriated to Britain in 1943 on account of ill health. Ten officers and 142 ratings were killed or died of their wounds.
