= HMS Codrington =

A-class destroyer

Coordinates: 51°7′32″N 1°20′4″E

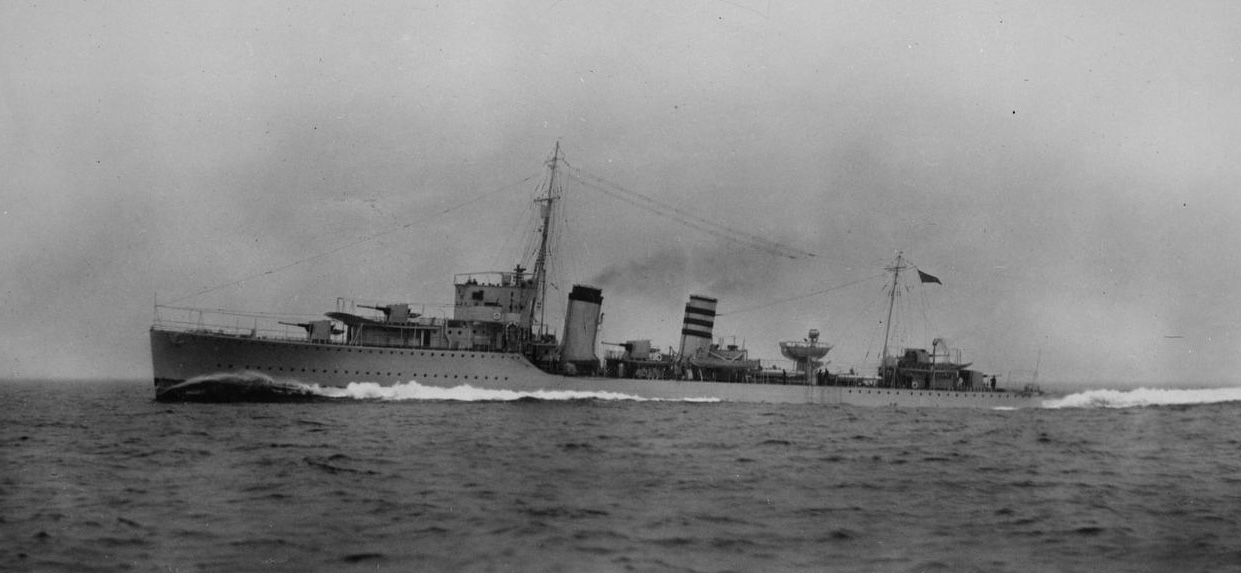
- Codrington at sea, 4 June 1930

History

United Kingdom
- Name: Codrington
- Namesake: Admiral Sir Edward Codrington
- Ordered: 6 March 1928
- Builder: Swan Hunter & Wigham Richardson, Wallsend
- Laid down: 20 June 1928
- Launched: 8 August 1929
- Commissioned: 4 June 1930
- Motto: Vultus in hosten; "Facing the enemy"
- Fate: Bombed and sunk, 27 July 1940
- Badge: On a Field Silver, a Lion passant Red

General characteristics (as built)
- Class & type: A-class destroyer flotilla leader
- Displacement: 1,540 long tons (1,565 t) (standard)
- Length: 343 ft (104.5 m)
- Beam: 33 ft 9 in (10.3 m)
- Draught: 19 ft 9 in (6 m)
- Installed power: 3 × Admiralty 3-drum boilers; 39,000 shp (29,000 kW)
- Propulsion: 2 × shafts; 2 × geared steam turbines
- Speed: 35 knots (65 km/h; 40 mph)
- Range: 5,000 nmi (9,300 km; 5,800 mi) at 15 knots (28 km/h; 17 mph)
- Complement: 185
- Armament: 5 × single 4.7-inch (120 mm) guns; 2 × single 2-pdr (40 mm) AA guns; 2 × quadruple 21 in (533 mm) torpedo tubes; 2 × depth charge throwers; 4 × chutes for 8 depth charges

HMS Codrington was the flotilla leader for the A-class destroyers built for the Royal Navy (RN) during the 1920s. Completed in 1930, the ship spent most of the 1930s assigned to the Mediterranean Fleet. She helped to enforce the arms embargo imposed on both sides in the Spanish Civil War of 1936–1939. Codrington returned home in early 1937 and was refitted before serving as a training ship in 1938–1939.

During the Second World War she reverted to her designed role, serving in home waters on patrol and convoy escort duties. In early 1940 Codrington played a minor role during the Norwegian campaign and then the German invasion of France and the Low Countries in May. The ship evacuated over 5,000 troops from Dunkirk and other French ports (Operation Cycle and Operation Aerial) before the French surrender of 22 June. She resumed her earlier duties later that month before being bombed and sunk on 27 July at Dover. Her wreck was partially salvaged during the war and completed several years later after the war.

== Background and description ==
Codrington was an improved version of the Admiralty type flotilla leader built during World War I. As a flotilla leader the ship was almost 200 long tons (200 t) larger than the other A-class destroyers because she carried more guns and her bridge structure had to be enlarged to provide the additional accommodation required for the Captain (D) and his staff. Codrington displaced 1,540 long tons (1,560 t) at (standard load) and 2,012 long tons (2,044 t) at deep load. The ship had an overall length of 343 ft (104.5 m), a beam of 34 ft 9 in (10.6 m) and a draught at deep load. of 12 ft 4 in (3.8 m). Codrington's crew consisted of 138 officers and ratings.

She was powered by two Parsons geared steam turbines, each driving one propeller shaft using steam provided by three Admiralty three-drum boilers that operated at a pressure of 300 pounds per square inch (2,068 kPa; 21 kgf/cm^{2}) and a temperature of 600 °F (316 °C). The turbines developed a total of 39,000 shaft horsepower (29,000 kW) for a designed speed of 35 knots (65 km/h; 40 mph), but the ship exceeded that during her sea trials in February 1930 when she reached a speed of 37.74 knots (69.89 km/h; 43.43 mph) from 39,257 shp (29,274 kW). Codrington carried a maximum of 430 long tons (440 t) of fuel oil that gave her a range of 4,800 nautical miles (8,900 km; 5,500 mi) at 15 knots (28 km/h; 17 mph). The ship was significantly less manoeuvrable than the other ships of her flotilla with a turning circle 380 yards (350 m) greater; this caused difficulties when moving in concert with her flotilla.

The main armament of the leader consisted of five quick-firing (QF) 4.7-inch (120 mm) Mark IX guns in single mounts protected by gun shields, designated 'A', 'B', 'Q', 'X', and 'Y' from front to rear. They were positioned in two superfiring pairs at the front and rear of the superstructure; the fifth gun was located on a platform between funnels. The gun mounts had a maximum elevation of 30°. The guns fired a 50-pound (23 kg) shell at a muzzle velocity of 2,650 ft/s (810 m/s) to a range of 16,970 yards (15,520 m). Each gun was provided with 190 rounds. For anti-aircraft (AA) defence, Codrington was fitted with two 40-millimetre (1.6 in) QF two-pounder Mark II AA guns mounted on platforms abaft the rear funnel, each with 500 rounds. The ship was equipped with two quadruple mounts for 21-inch (533 mm) torpedo tubes. Although she was never fitted with ASDIC, Codrington carried eight depth charges that were delivered by four chutes, each dropping one depth charge and two throwers.

=== Modifications ===
It is unknown if the flotilla leader's depth-charge equipment changed after the beginning of the war but her stock of depth charges gradually increased. The first step was to 25 depth charges and then to 47 before her loss in July 1940. The Norwegian Campaign had shown the RN that its ships were much more vulnerable to aircraft than it had realized and it decided to substitute a QF three-inch (76 mm) 20-cwt anti-aircraft gun, for the ship's after torpedo-tube mount on 17 May 1940. (Note: "Cwt" is the abbreviation for hundredweight, 20 cwt referring to the weight of the gun.)

== Construction and career ==
HMS Codrington was ordered on 6 March 1928 from Swan Hunter & Wigham Richardson, under the 1927 Naval Estimates. The ship was laid down at the shipyard in Wallsend, on 20 June 1928 and launched on 8 August 1929. Commissioned on 4 June 1930, she has thus far been the only ship of the Royal Navy to be named Codrington.

=== Pre-war operations ===
After working up, in July 1930 Codridgton became the leader of the 3rd Destroyer Flotilla of the Mediterranean Fleet. In June 1931, the destroyer returned to Devonport Naval Base for modifications to her turbines, returning to the Mediterranean at the end of the month. Codrington was refitted again at Devonport in September–October 1932, again returning to the 3rd Flotilla. On 12 June 1934, Codrington and the destroyer Acasta collided. Both ships received minor damage, with no injuries occurring.

On 17 July 1936, the Spanish Civil War began, with Codrington carrying out patrols off the Spanish coast. On 23 August, Codrington went to the aid of the British steamer Gibel Jerom (operated by the Bland Line), which had been stopped by the Spanish Republican light cruiser Miguel de Cervantes off Cape Tres Forcas while bound for Nationalist-held Melilla with a cargo of petrol. Codrington's commanding officer warned the captain of Miguel de Cervantes that Britain would not tolerate any interference with British shipping outside the three-mile limit. Codrington escorted Gibel Jerom back to Gibraltar. On 12 January 1937, Codrington and the depot ship Woolwich were in Valencia harbour when the harbour was shelled by a Nationalist warship.

Codrington returned to Britain in March 1937, and was replaced as leader of the 3rd Flotilla by the new Inglefield in June 1937. She then entered the reserve, but was refitted and then attached to the Royal Naval Engineering College at Keyham, Plymouth in October 1938. On 7 June 1939, Codrington took part in a tribute to the crew of the submarine Thetis, which had sunk on trials in Liverpool Bay, above where Thetis had sunk. After another refit she was recommissioned on completion of the refit in August 1939.

=== Wartime career ===
==== The English Channel and French coast ====
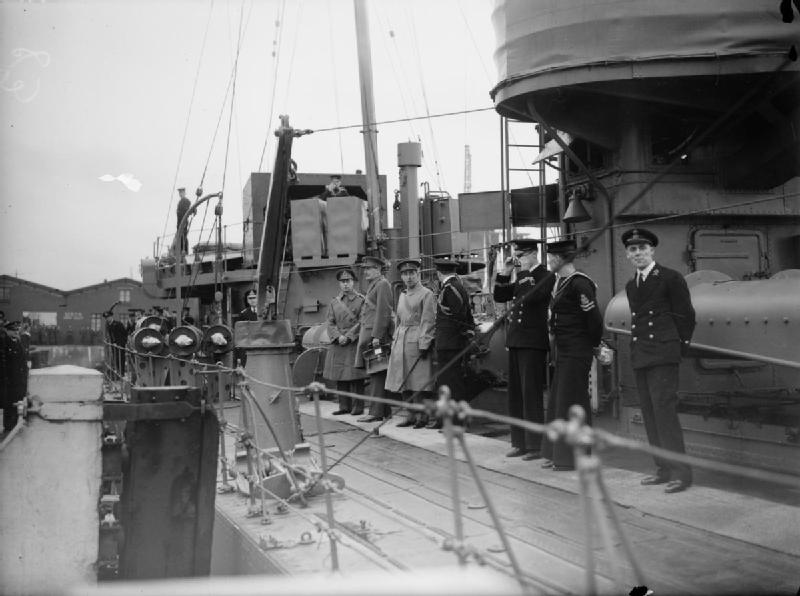
King George VI returns to Britain aboard Codrington after visiting the BEF

After being recommissioned, Codrington became part of the 19th Destroyer Flotilla, based at Dover as part of the Nore Command. During September and October 1939, the ship escorted convoys carrying the British Expeditionary Force to France. She conducted patrols and escorted convoys in the English Channel and the North Sea through December. Codrington embarked King George VI on 4 December and transported him to Boulogne for his visit to the British Expeditionary Force in France. Codrington re-embarked him on 10 December and brought him back to Dover.

1940 saw Codrington continue to host VIPs, as on 4 January, she embarked Winston Churchill (then First Lord of the Admiralty) on a visit to France. In February, she was nominated as the flotilla leader of the 1st Destroyer Flotilla based at Harwich, and that became effective on 3 March after the ship had a brief refit.

==== The North Sea and Norwegian coast ====
On completion of the refit, she joined the flotilla at Harwich on 6 March and resumed convoy defence and patrol duties in the North Sea. The following month, she was transferred for detached service with the Home Fleet. Receiving word that the Royal Air Force had attacked north-bound German warships in the North Sea on 7 April, the fleet, consisting of Codrington, the destroyers Griffin, Jupiter, Electra, Escapade, Brazen, Bedouin, Punjabi, Eskimo and Kimberley formed a screen for the battleships Ramillies and Valiant, the battlecruiser Repulse, the light cruisers Sheffield, Penelope and the French Émile Bertin. The ships put to sea that evening on a course that would position it to block an attempt to breakout into the Atlantic through the North Sea. The British were unaware that the German ships were part of the forces supporting Operation Weserübung the invasion of Norway. Two days later the fleet was discovered by German bombers and attacked with little effect. Codrington was detached to return to Sullom Voe for refuelling on 10 April.

She was back in action on 14 April, being deployed with the destroyers Acasta and Ardent as part of the screen for Valiant which was escorting Convoy NP1 transporting troops and stores for the planned landings in Norway. Codrington remained at Harstad for the rest of the month, carrying out miscellaneous duties. She was part of the escort for Convoy FP2 from Scapa Flow to Harstad which conveyed the French 27^{e} Demi-Brigade de Chasseurs Alpins (27th Half-Brigade of Mountain Infantry) from 24 to 27 April. The following day, the ship embarked Admiral of the Fleet, the Earl of Cork and Orrery and the French General Antoine Béthouart. They carried out a reconnaissance of the Narvik area, in preparation for the later assaults by Allied troops. During the survey, Codrington bombarded German gun positions and railway targets.

==== Covering the evacuations ====
When the Germans invaded France and the Low Countries on 10 May, Codrington was transferred back to England, arriving at Dover the following day. On 13 May the ship embarked members of the Dutch royal family at IJmuiden, Netherlands, and ferried them to safety in Britain. With the destroyer Jaguar, Codrington covered an unsuccessful attempt to cut the underwater telephone cable between Amsterdam and England between 22 and 24 May.

Four days later the ship began to evacuate troops from Dunkirk. The morning of 28 May, with the destroyers Jaguar and Javelin, she rescued 33 survivors from the torpedoed Belgian coaster SS Abukir and transferred them to the destroyer Grenade. Codrington took on 866 men from Dunkirk harbour and transported them to Dover. She made a second trip on 29 May, embarking 766 troops, and a third on 30 May, embarking 799 troops. A fourth trip followed on 31 May, when she loaded 909 men, together with other vessels. 1 June saw her taking 746 troops back to Dover, including Major-General (later Field Marshal) Bernard Montgomery. On 2 June the ship brought 878 troops back to the UK and her final run the next day saw only 44 men evacuated.

Codrington was ordered to rendezvous with other destroyers off the French coast on the night of 9/10 June in preparation to evacuate British troops from Le Havre, but this was postponed to allow the French to evacuate their troops first. The ship's captain served Senior Naval Officer (Afloat) off Saint-Valery-en-Caux when the British attempted to rescue the men of the 51st (Highland) Division on the night of 11/12 June, but were greatly impeded by a heavy fog that night. The destroyer only managed to evacuate one man to Portsmouth.

In July Codrington was still the leader for the 1st Destroyer Flotilla which was based at Dover for convoy defence and patrol duties in the English Channel. The ship put into port near the end of the month to be demagnetised and to have her boilers cleaned. She was anchored alongside the submarine tender Sandhurst to have the work done. Dover was attacked on 27 July by Messerschmitt Bf 109E-4/B fighter-bombers of 3. Staffel/Erprobungsgruppe 210 3 Squadron, Experimental Wing 210). The destroyer was near-missed by a bomb but the subsequent detonation broke her back and riddled her hull with holes; only three men were wounded in the explosion. The sinking was not made public until 18 May 1945 for reasons of security.

Salvage work was delayed until 1941 when most of the ship's structure protruding above the water was removed. Removing the hull was much more difficult as the wreck's location precluded the use of large amounts of explosives to cut the ship in half and allow each half to be raised individually. The salvage company lacked the floating sheerleg barge it deemed necessary to lift the ship and had to purchase a condemned barge. The repairs and installation of equipment meant that the barge did not arrive at Dover until 13 June 1942. In the meantime, hardhat divers had inspected the wreck and done some preliminary cutting to facilitate severing the halves of the ship. The discovery of four feet (1.2 m) of mud in the boiler room and the torn and twisted pipework therein greatly slowed progress, enough so that the Admiralty cancelled the contract on 30 October and took over the task. Half of the ship was refloated and moved to a nearby beach for demolition that lasted for several years. Attempts to refloat the other half in May 1947 failed but the wreck was lifted at an unknown date; its ultimate disposition is unknown.
