= HMS Blanche (H47) =

B-class destroyer for the Royal Navy around 1930

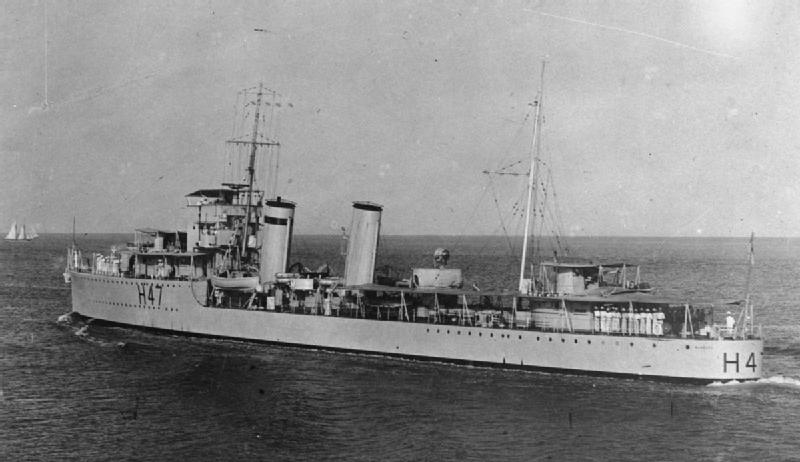
- Blanche in 1932

History

United Kingdom
- Name: Blanche
- Ordered: 4 March 1929
- Builder: Hawthorn Leslie, Hebburn
- Laid down: 29 July 1929
- Launched: 29 May 1930
- Completed: 14 February 1931
- Fate: Sunk by mine, 13 November 1939

General characteristics (as built)
- Class & type: B-class destroyer
- Displacement: 1,360 long tons (1,380 t) (standard)
- Length: 323 ft (98.5 m) (o/a)
- Beam: 32 ft 3 in (9.8 m)
- Draught: 12 ft 3 in (3.7 m)
- Installed power: 3 × Admiralty 3-drum boilers; 34,000 shp (25,000 kW)
- Propulsion: 2 × shafts; 2 × geared steam turbines
- Speed: 35 knots (65 km/h; 40 mph)
- Range: 4,800 nmi (8,900 km; 5,500 mi) at 15 knots (28 km/h; 17 mph)
- Complement: 142 (wartime)
- Sensors & processing systems: Type 119 ASDIC
- Armament: 4 × single 4.7 in (120 mm) guns; 2 × single 2 pdr (40 mm (1.6 in)) AA guns; 2 × quadruple 21 in (533 mm) torpedo tubes; 1 × depth charge rail and 2 throwers; 20 × depth charges

HMS Blanche (H47) was a B-class destroyer built for the Royal Navy around 1930. During the Spanish Civil War of 1936–1939, the ship spent considerable time in Spanish waters, enforcing the non-intervention measures agreed by Britain and France. She was attacked, but not damaged, by Nationalist bombers in early 1938 and was subsequently transferred to the Home Fleet. Blanche was sunk by a mine in November 1939, becoming the first British destroyer lost to enemy action in World War II.

== Description ==
Blanche displaced 1,360 long tons (1,380 t) at standard load and 1,790 long tons (1,820 t) at deep load. The ship had an overall length of 323 feet (98.5 m), a beam of 32 feet 3 inches (9.8 m) and a draught of 12 feet 3 inches (3.7 m). She was powered by Parsons geared steam turbines, driving two shafts, which developed a total of 34,000 shaft horsepower (25,000 kW) and gave a maximum speed of 35 knots (65 km/h; 40 mph). Steam for the turbines was provided by three Admiralty 3-drum boilers. Blanche carried a maximum of 390 long tons (400 t) of fuel oil that gave her a range of 4,800 nautical miles (8,900 km; 5,500 mi) at 15 knots (28 km/h; 17 mph). The ship's complement was 134 officers and men, although it increased to 142 during wartime.

The ship mounted four 45-calibre QF 4.7-inch Mk IX guns in single mounts. For anti-aircraft (AA) defence, Blanche had two 40-millimetre (1.6 in) QF 2-pounder Mk II AA guns mounted on a platform between her funnels. She was fitted with two above-water quadruple torpedo tube mounts for 21-inch (533 mm) torpedoes. One depth charge rail and two throwers were fitted; 20 depth charges were originally carried, but this increased to 35 shortly after the war began.

== Career ==
The ship was ordered on 4 March 1929 from Hawthorn Leslie of Hebburn, under the 1928 Naval Programme. She was laid down on 29 July 1929, and launched on 29 May 1930, as the tenth RN ship to carry this name. Blanche was completed on 14 February 1931 at a cost of £225,195, excluding items supplied by the Admiralty such as guns, ammunition and communications equipment. After her commissioning, she was assigned to the 4th Destroyer Flotilla with the Mediterranean Fleet until 1936. The ship was refitted that year and reassigned, with her flotilla, to Home Fleet, after its completion. Blanche spent six months deployed off the southern Spanish coast during the Spanish Civil War, based in Gibraltar, evacuating British travellers including Laurie Lee. On 6 April 1937, the Spanish Nationalist cruiser Almirante Cervera, which was taking part in a blockade of the Republican-held north of Spain, stopped the British merchant ship Thorpehall, carrying a cargo of food, outside Bilbao. Blanche and sister ship Brazen responded to Thorpehall's distress signal, causing the Nationalist ships to break off and allowing Thorpehall to enter Bilbao. She was attacked by five Nationalist bombers on 6 March 1938, but they all missed. The ship received a brief overhaul at Portsmouth between 1 April and 11 June 1938 and was then assigned to the anti-submarine flotilla based at the Isle of Portland. During the Munich Crisis, Blanche was one of the destroyers that escorted the ocean liner RMS Aquitania and the battleship HMS Revenge in the English Channel on 30 September. She was given a more thorough refit in Sheerness Dockyard between 1 April and 15 July 1939 and became the emergency destroyer at the Nore upon its completion.

Blanche was assigned to the 19th Destroyer Flotilla when World War II began and spent the next two months escorting convoys and patrolling in the Channel and North Sea. The ship and her sister Basilisk were escorting the minelayer Adventure on the morning of 13 November in the Thames Estuary when they entered a minefield laid the night before by several German destroyers. Adventure and Blanche both struck mines; the latter lost all power and capsized at 0950. One man was killed and twelve more were wounded. She was the first British destroyer sunk by the Germans during the war.
