= A- and B-class destroyer =

1929 class of British destroyers

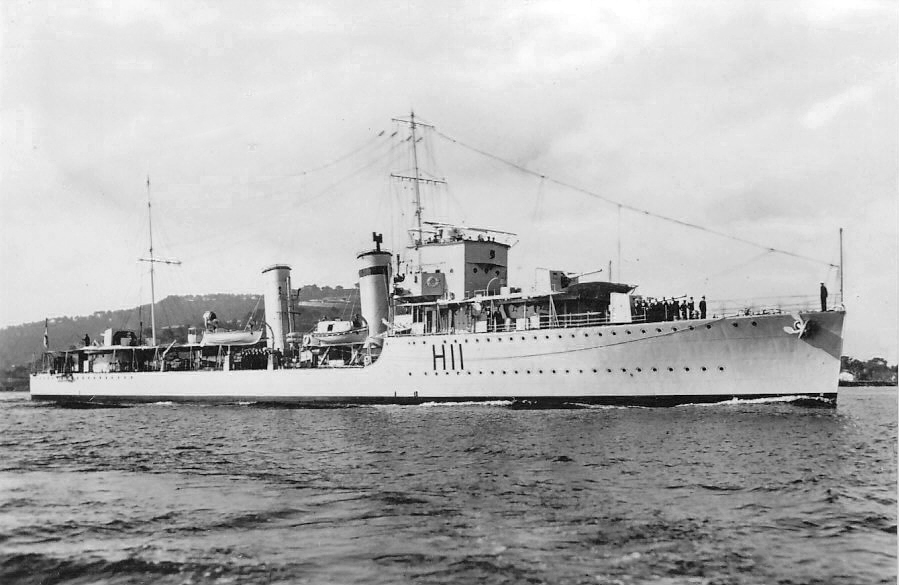
- Basilisk, 21 October 1937

Class overview
- Name: A and B class
- Operators: Royal Navy; Royal Canadian Navy; Royal Hellenic Navy
- Preceded by: Ambuscade and Amazon
- Succeeded by: C and D class
- Subclasses: A, B
- Built: 1928–1931
- In service: 1930–1945
- Completed: 20
- Lost: 10
- Scrapped: 10

General characteristics (as built)
- Type: Destroyer
- Displacement: 1,350–1,360 long tons (1,370–1,380 t) (standard); 1,778–1,790 long tons (1,807–1,819 t) (deep load)
- Length: 323 ft (98 m) (o/a)
- Beam: 32 ft 3 in (9.83 m)
- Draught: 12 ft 3 in (3.73 m)
- Installed power: 3 × Admiralty 3-drum boilers; 34,000 shp (25,000 kW)
- Propulsion: 2 × shafts; 2 × geared steam turbines
- Speed: 35 knots (65 km/h; 40 mph)
- Range: 4,800 nmi (8,900 km; 5,500 mi) at 15 knots (28 km/h; 17 mph)
- Complement: 138
- Armament: 4 × single 4.7 in (120 mm) guns; 2 × single 2 pdr (40 mm (1.6 in)) AA guns; 2 × quadruple 21 in (533 mm) torpedo tubes

General characteristics Saguenay and Skeena (where different)
- Displacement: 1,337 long tons (1,358 t) (standard); 1,805 long tons (1,834 t) (deep load)
- Length: 321 ft (98 m) (o/a)
- Draught: 12 ft 3 in (3.73 m)
- Propulsion: 32,000 shp (24,000 kW)
- Range: 5,000 nmi (9,300 km; 5,800 mi) at 15 knots

General characteristics Codrington (A-class flotilla leader)
- Displacement: 1,540 long tons (1,560 t) (standard); 2,012 long tons (2,044 t) (deep load)
- Length: 343 ft (105 m) (o/a)
- Beam: 33 ft 9 in (10.29 m)
- Installed power: 39,000 shp (29,000 kW)
- Complement: 185
- Armament: 5 × single 4.7 in guns
- Notes: (where different)

General characteristics Keith (B-class flotilla leader)
- Displacement: 1,400 long tons (1,400 t) (standard); 1,821 long tons (1,850 t) (deep load)
- Complement: 157
- Notes: (where different)

The A- and B-class destroyers were a group of 18 destroyers built for the Royal Navy during the late 1920s, with two additional ships built for the Royal Canadian Navy. The British ships were divided into two flotillas of eight destroyers, each with a flotilla leader.

== Design and description ==
The A-class design was derived from the 1926 prototypes Amazon and Ambuscade for the 1927–28 Naval Construction Programme. The initial staff requirements were unrealistic and would have resulted in a much larger, unaffordable ship; they were scaled back, both to reduce the size of the ship and to save money. Nonetheless, the design had an improved gun armament, heavier torpedo armament, and greater range, at the cost of 2 knots (3.7 km/h; 2.3 mph) of speed, in comparison with the prototypes. The As were fitted with the Two-Speed Destroyer Sweep (TSDS) minesweeping gear and only had a residual anti-submarine ability while the Bs were equipped with Type 119 ASDIC (sonar) and had a full complement of depth charges, but could not use the TSDS.

This was the beginning of the Admiralty's policy of alternating TSDS and anti-submarine capabilities between destroyer flotillas. The ships displaced 1,350–1,360 long tons (1,370–1,380 t) at standard load and 1,778–1,790 long tons (1,807–1,819 t) at deep load. They had an overall length of 323 feet (98.5 m), a waterline length of 320 feet (98 m), a length between perpendiculars of 312 feet (95 m), a beam of 32 feet 3 inches (9.8 m), 19 feet (5.8 m) of hull depth and a draught of 8.5 feet (2.6 m) at standard load and 12 feet 3 inches (3.7 m) at deep load. The A class had a metacentric height of 1.76 feet (0.54 m) at deep load. The ships' complement was 138 officers and ratings as built, but increased in size up to 162 during the war.

The destroyers were powered by two Parsons geared steam turbines, each driving one propeller shaft using steam provided by three water-tube boilers equipped with superheaters. These boilers were arranged in two rooms, with a 28 ft long forward room with a single boiler, and 46 ft aft room with two boilers. The engine room was 50 ft long. Five of the As and all of the Bs had Admiralty three-drum boilers that operated at a pressure of 300 pounds per square inch (2,068 kPa; 21 kgf/cm^{2}) and a temperature of 600 °F (316 °C) while Ardent and Anthony were fitted with Yarrow boilers of 275 psi (1,896 kPa; 19 kgf/cm^{2}) pressure at the same temperature. Acheron was given experimental Thornycroft boilers that had a working pressure of 500 psi (3,447 kPa; 35 kgf/cm^{2}) and a temperature of 750 °F (399 °C) to examine the weight and economy savings.

Her fuel consumption at full power was reduced from 0.81 lb (0.37 kg)/hp/hour in her 300 psi equipped sister ships to 0.608 lb (0.276 kg)/hp/hour, however her total machinery weight was higher, at 35•7 lbs per shp, compared to 33•3 lbs per shp in the above-mentioned sister ships. While her boilers and auxiliaries were satisfactory, the high pressure turbine gave continuous trouble in service due to excessive vibration at speed (forcing her to be limited to only 20 knots.) Although by 1939, HMS Acheron was described as a 'thoroughly reliable destroyer and remained so until sunk by enemy action," the lateness of the requisite fixes due to a lack of proper shore testing facilities, money, and risk averseness in the Royal Navy, led to continued to use the lower-temperature and pressure Admiralty three-drum boiler until the Battle class of 1942, nearly ten years after other major navies began to use higher-pressure and temperature boilers. The turbines developed a total of 34,000 shaft horsepower (25,000 kW) at 350 shaft rpm for a designed speed of 35 knots (65 km/h; 40 mph) and the ship exceeded that during their sea trials. The destroyers carried a maximum of 388–390 long tons (394–396 t) of fuel oil that gave them a range of 4,800 nautical miles (8,900 km; 5,500 mi) at 15 knots (28 km/h; 17 mph).

All of the ships had the same main armament, four quick-firing (QF) 4.7-inch (120 mm) Mark IX guns in single mounts with enlarged gun shields, designated 'A', 'B', 'X', and 'Y' from front to rear. Although the A class were intended to be equipped with gun mounts that could elevate up to 40°, and 'B' gun on a high-angle mount capable of 60°, all four guns ultimately had a maximum elevation of 30°. They fired a 50-pound (23 kg) shell at a muzzle velocity of 2,650 ft/s (810 m/s) to a range of 16,970 yards (15,520 m). Each gun was provided with 190 rounds. For anti-aircraft (AA) defence, the A- and B-class ships carried two 40-millimetre (1.6 in) QF two-pounder Mark II AA guns mounted on platforms between the funnels, each with 500 rounds. They were fitted with two quadruple mounts for 21-inch (533 mm) torpedo tubes. The A-class ships were initially going to be fitted with two throwers and four chutes for eight depth charges, but they interfered with the TSDS equipment so the throwers, one chute and two depth charges were removed. The Bs were equipped with two throwers and one rack for twenty depth charges. While not initially fitted with ASDIC, space was reserved for it, and at least some of the As received it beginning in the late 1930s.

The fire-control system for these ships was little advanced over their First World War-era predecessors. A pedestal-mounted, manually operated Destroyer Director Sight and a separate nine-foot (2.7 m) rangefinder positioned to its rear were situated above the bridge; the director transmitted training angles and firing impulses to the main guns, which fired at fixed elevations. They had no capability for anti-aircraft fire and the anti-aircraft guns were aimed solely by eye. No fire-control computer was initially installed, but an Admiralty Fire Control Clock Mark II was retrofitted after it had been proven in the subsequent C-class destroyers.

Design Weights
Categories	A class	B class	Codrington
Hull	600 t	603 t	685 t
Machinery (dry)	505 t	505 t	575 t
Armament	135 t	122 t	150 t
Equipment	90 t	100 t	110 t
Standard Displacement	1330 t	1330 t	1,520 t

=== Canadian ships ===
The two Canadian ships (Saguenay and Skeena) were designed to be of a similar performance to the A-class ships to allow them to tactically combine. More flare was given to the bow to keep it drier and the forward part of the hull was strengthened to withstand ice. Their metacentric height was increased to allow for the build-up of ice and snow on the upperworks and they were three feet (0.9 m) shorter than their British counterparts. Although the ships had an additional 50 long tons (51 t) of fuel, 2,000 shp (1,500 kW) fewer horsepower, lacked superheaters for their boilers and had heavier machinery, they had the same range and speed as their brethren of the A and B classes. They displaced 1,337 long tons (1,358 t) at standard load and 1,805 long tons (1,834 t) at deep load. The ships were built by John I. Thornycroft & Company in Woolston, Hampshire and had the broad, slab-sided funnels characteristic of that builder.

=== Flotilla leaders ===
Codrington was built to an enlarged design to accommodate the commander of the destroyer flotilla, Captain (D) and his staff, some 47 additional officers and ratings. The ship displaced roughly 200 long tons (200 t) more than the private ships (1,540 long tons (1,560 t) at standard load and 2,012 long tons (2,044 t) at deep load); she was 20 feet (6.1 m) longer overall and had a beam 1 foot (0.3 m) wider. She shipped a fifth 4.7-inch gun between the funnels, which forced the two-pounders to be repositioned abaft the rear funnel, and was not fitted with TSDS. To compensate for her greater size, Codrington's oil tanks were increased by 40 long tons (41 t) and her turbines were rated at 39,000 shp (29,000 kW) to give her the same range and speed as the private ships, but she proved to be significantly faster as she made 37.7 knots (69.8 km/h; 43.4 mph) during her sea trials. However, the increased length made her somewhat unhandy, having a turning circle much greater than the standard A class, which complicated manoeuvres with her flotilla.

Unlike Codrington, Keith was built upon the same hull as her sisters to save money and to make her tactically identical to her flotilla-mates. The initial proposal was to enlarge the aft deckhouse to make room for the Captain (D) and his staff at the expense of 'Y' gun and the TSDS gear, but the gun was reinstated while she was under construction. The ship was too small to accommodate the entirety of the staff, and Blanche was fitted as a divisional leader to carry the surplus. Keith was 40 long tons (41 t) heavier than the private ships at standard load and nearly 100 long tons (100 t) heavier at full load (1,400 long tons (1,400 t) and 1,821 long tons (1,850 t), respectively) and carried 19 additional officers and ratings.

=== Wartime modifications ===
The initial wartime modifications were limited and mostly related to the survivability of the crew, aside from the addition of 50 rounds per gun of 4.7-inch ammunition and the increase of depth charge stowage to 42 (the Canadian ships carried 33). Beginning in May 1940, the after bank of torpedo tubes was removed in most ships and replaced with a QF three-inch (76 mm) 20-cwt anti-aircraft gun, (Note: "Cwt" is the abbreviation for hundredweight, 20 cwt referring to the weight of the gun.) the after mast and funnel being cut down to improve the gun's field of fire. Of the early war losses, only Codrington and Acheron received this modification before they were sunk. By October, all of the surviving A-class ships plus Beagle, Boadicea, Boreas and Brilliant had been modified and the rest of the Bs had received theirs by April 1941.

Beginning in 1941, most ships had 'Y' gun and the TSDS gear replaced by racks and throwers for a pattern of 10 depth charges, with stowage increased to 70 charges. Their light AA armament was augmented by a pair of QF Oerlikon 20-millimetre (0.79 in) guns, one each abreast the bridge, and a Type 286 short-range, surface-search radar, adapted from the Royal Air Force's ASV radar, was also added. The early models, however, could only scan directly forward and had to be aimed by turning the entire ship. The Canadian ships replaced their two-pounders with a pair of quadruple 0.5-inch (12.7 mm) machine guns and were not fitted with Oerlikons by 1942.

Late that year, some of the surviving ships were further modified into what became known as escort destroyers. These ships had either 'A' or 'B' gun replaced by a Hedgehog anti-submarine spigot mortar. Achates, Beagle, Boreas, and Bulldog were among the first ships to be so converted. Around this same time many ships had their Destroyer Director Sight and rangefinder exchanged for a Type 271 target-indication radar. Beagle and Bulldog were later fitted with a two-pounder bow chaser to engage German E-boats in the English Channel while Boadicea received two elderly six-pounder (57 mm) Hotchkiss guns to deal with U-boats on the surface at close range.

Beginning in 1943, the three-inch gun was removed to allow for the installation of a Huff-Duff radio direction finder on a short mainmast; the aft torpedo tubes were sometimes reinstalled. The single 20 mm guns abreast the bridge were replaced by Mark V powered mountings for twin weapons later in the war, the singles replacing the two-pounder or .50 caliber guns amidships, with a further pair of Oerlikons that replaced the searchlight between the torpedo tubes.

== Ships ==
=== A-class ships ===
Construction data
Ship	Navy	Builder	Laid down	Launched	Commissioned	Fate
Codrington	Royal Navy	Swan Hunter & Wigham Richardson, Wallsend	20 June 1928	8 August 1929	4 April 1930	Bombed and sunk off Dover, 27 July 1940
Acasta	Royal Navy	John Brown & Company, Clydebank	13 August 1928	8 August 1929	11 February 1930	Sunk by the German battleships Scharnhorst and Gneisenau off Narvik, 8 June 1940
Achates	Royal Navy	John Brown & Company, Clydebank	11 September 1928	4 October 1929	11 February 1930	Sunk by the German cruiser Admiral Hipper in Battle of the Barents Sea, 31 December 1942
Active	Royal Navy	Hawthorn Leslie & Company, Hebburn	10 July 1928	9 July 1929	9 February 1930	Sold for breaking up, 7 July 1947
Antelope	Royal Navy	Hawthorn Leslie & Company, Hebburn	11 July 1928	27 July 1929	20 February 1930	Sold for breaking up, 28 January 1946
Anthony	Royal Navy	Scotts Shipbuilding & Engineering Company, Greenock	30 July 1928	24 April 1929	14 February 1930	Sold for breaking up, 21 February 1948
Ardent	Royal Navy	Scotts Shipbuilding & Engineering Company, Greenock	30 July 1928	26 June 1929	14 April 1930	Sunk by the German battleships Scharnhorst and Gneisenau off Narvik, 8 June 1940
Arrow	Royal Navy	Vickers Armstrongs, Barrow-in-Furness	20 August 1928	22 August 1929	14 April 1930	Damaged by the explosion of SS Fort Lamontee in Algiers, 4 August 1943, and written off as a constructive total loss
Acheron	Royal Navy	John I. Thornycroft & Company, Woolston	29 October 1928	18 March 1930	13 October 1931	Mined off the Isle of Wight, 17 December 1940
Saguenay	Royal Canadian Navy	John I. Thornycroft & Company, Woolston	27 September 1929	11 July 1930	22 May 1931	Damaged in a collision 15 November 1942 and de-rated to training ship, sold for scrap 1945
Skeena	Royal Canadian Navy	John I. Thornycroft & Company, Woolston	14 October 1929	10 October 1930	10 June 1931	Wrecked in Kollafjord, Iceland, 25 October 1944

=== B-class ships ===
Construction data
Ship	Builder	Laid down	Launched	Commissioned	Fate
Keith	Vickers Armstrongs, Barrow in Furness	1 October 1929	10 July 1930	20 March 1931	Sunk by German aircraft off Dunkirk during evacuation of BEF from France, 1 June 1940
Basilisk	John Brown & Company, Clydebank	18 August 1929	6 August 1930	4 April 1931	Sunk by German aircraft off Dunkirk during evacuation of BEF from France, 1 June 1940
Beagle	John Brown & Company, Clydebank	11 October 1929	29 September 1930	9 April 1931	Scrapped, 1946
Blanche	Hawthorn Leslie & Co., Hebburn	29 July 1929	29 May 1930	14 February 1931	Sunk by a mine, 13 November 1939
Boadicea	Hawthorn Leslie & Co., Hebburn	11 July 1929	23 September 1930	7 April 1931	Sunk by German bombers off Portland, 13 June 1944
Boreas	Palmers Shipbuilding and Iron Company, Jarrow	22 July 1929	18 July 1930	20 February 1931	Scrapped, 1952
Brazen	Palmers Shipbuilding and Iron Company, Jarrow	22 July 1929	25 July 1930	8 April 1931	Sunk by German aircraft off Dover, 20 July 1940
Brilliant	Swan Hunter & Wigham Richardson, Wallsend	8 July 1929	9 October 1930	21 February 1931	Scrapped, 1948
Bulldog	Swan Hunter & Wigham Richardson, Wallsend	10 August 1929	6 December 1930	8 April 1931	Scrapped, 1946

== Service ==
The class saw much service in the Second World War, being involved in convoy protection and anti-submarine warfare in home waters and the North Atlantic. Seven of the eleven ships of the class were sunk in World War II. Acasta and Ardent were sunk on 8 June 1940 while escorting the aircraft carrier HMS Glorious by the German battleships Scharnhorst and Gneisenau west of Narvik at the end of the Norwegian campaign. Codrington was sunk by German air attack at Dover on 27 July 1940. Acheron was sunk by a mine off the Isle of Wight on 17 December 1940. Achates was sunk by two large German heavy cruisers, Admiral Hipper and Lützow while defending an Arctic convoy in the Battle of the Barents Sea. Arrow was so badly damaged when the ammunition ship Fort La Montee blew up on 4 August 1943 at Algiers that she could not be repaired and was towed to Taranto and paid off. Skeena was wrecked in a storm off Iceland on 25 October 1944. Saguenay was heavily damaged in a collision with the merchant ship Azara and was consigned to the role of a training ship after being repaired.

The surviving ships were worn out from war duties and were scrapped soon after the war.
