= Acaste =

Name of two figures in Greek mythology

Acaste (/əˈkæstiː/; Ancient Greek: Ἀκάστη) was the name of two figures in Greek mythology.

- Acaste, one of the Oceanids. She was among the companions of Persephone when Persephone was abducted by Hades.
- Acaste, the nurse of the daughters of king Adrastus of Argos.
