= HMS Adventure (M23) =

Minelaying cruiser of the Royal Navy

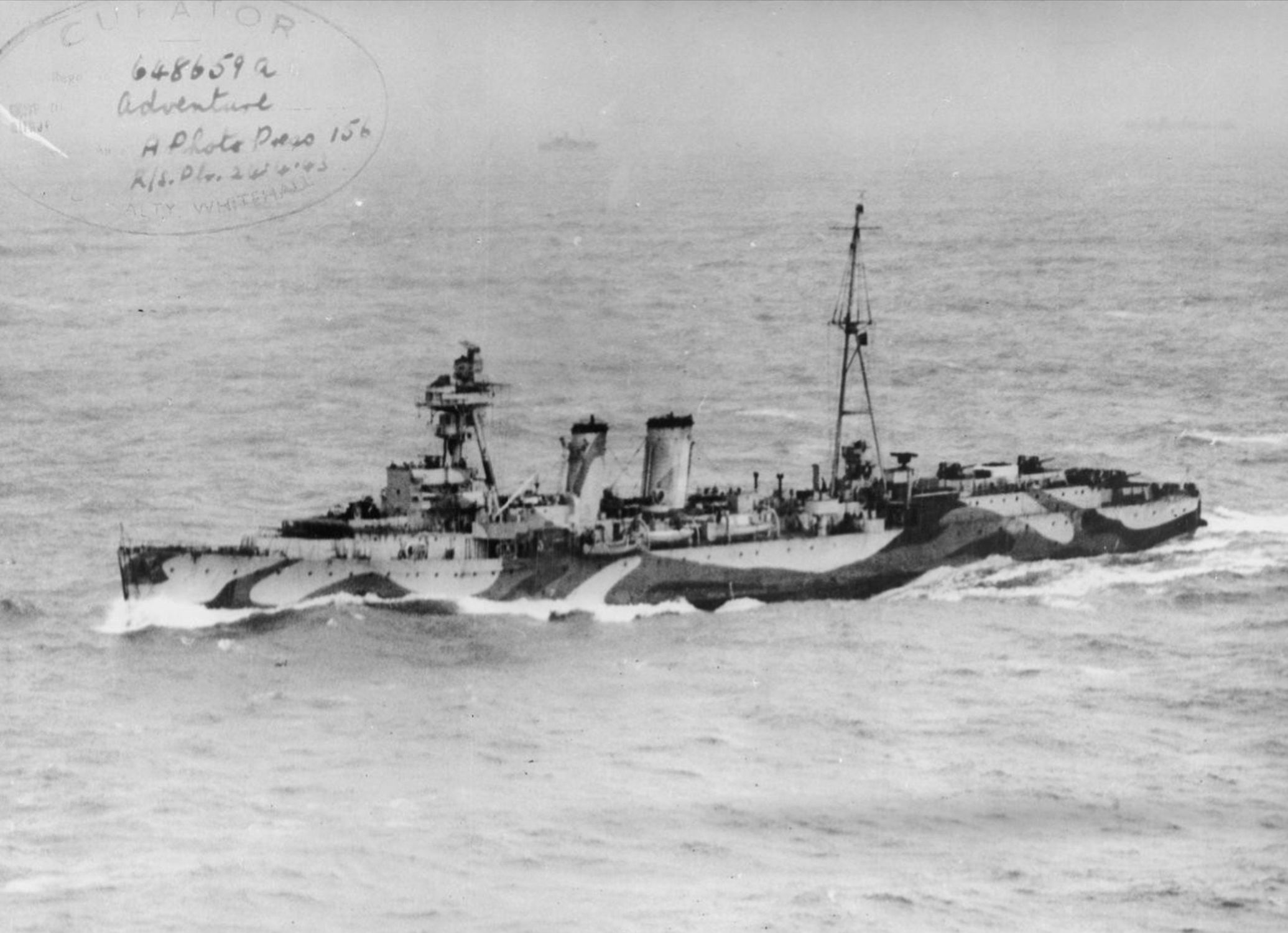
- Adventure in February 1943

History

United Kingdom
- Name: HMS Adventure
- Ordered: 18 July 1921
- Builder: Vickers Limited, Barrow-in-Furness & Devonport Royal Dockyard
- Laid down: 29 November 1922
- Launched: 18 June 1924
- Commissioned: 2 October 1926
- Reclassified: Repair ship 1944
- Identification: Pennant number: 23 (1922); M23 (1940)
- Fate: Sold for scrapping, 1947

General characteristics
- Type: Minelaying cruiser
- Displacement: 6,740 long tons (6,848 t) (standard)
- Length: 539 ft (164.3 m) (o/a)
- Beam: 59 ft (18.0 m)
- Draught: 17 ft 3 in (5.26 m) (full load)
- Installed power: 6 × Yarrow boilers; 40,000 shp (30,000 kW) (steam turbines); 9,200 bhp (6,900 kW) (diesel engines); 6,600 kW (alternators); 8,000 bhp (6,000 kW) (electric motors)
- Propulsion: 2 × shafts; geared steam turbines; 4 × Vickers 8-cylinder diesel engines with 2 × alternators; 2 × electric motors
- Speed: 27.75 knots (51.39 km/h; 31.93 mph) on steam turbines; 17 knots (31 km/h; 20 mph) on diesels
- Range: 4,500 nmi (8,300 km; 5,200 mi) at 12 knots (22 km/h; 14 mph)
- Complement: 395 (560 wartime)
- Armament: 4 × single QF 4.7-in Mark VIII; 4 × single QF 2-pounder Mk II; 1 × octuple QF 2-pounder Mk VIII; 2 × quadruple .5 in (13 mm) Vickers machine guns; later 9 × 20 mm Oerlikon guns; 280 (large pattern) - 340 (small pattern) mines

HMS Adventure, pennant number M23, was an Adventure-class minelaying cruiser of the Royal Navy built in the 1920s that saw service during the Second World War. Her commander between 1928 and 1929 was the future First Sea Lord John H. D. Cunningham. Laid down at Devonport in November 1922 and launched in June 1924, Adventure was the first vessel built for service as a minelayer; she was also the first warship to use diesel engines, which were used for cruising. Adventure first joined the Atlantic Fleet, then was transferred to the China Station in 1935. In World War II, the ship was damaged in 1941 and 1944, and was converted to a landing craft repair in 1944. In 1945 Adventure was reduced to reserve and in 1947 she was sold and broken up for scrap.

Adventure was the first cruiser design by Charles Lillicrap, who became the lead RN cruiser designer of the 1920s.

== Design ==
Adventure was built to replace the converted First World War veteran Princess Margaret, and her design was dictated by a requirement for a large mine capacity and a good cruising range. The mineload was to be carried completely internally, dictating a long, tall hull, and there were four sets of rails running the length of the hull to chutes at the stern. She was built with a transom, or flat, stern, to improve cruising efficiency, but the dead water caused by such a form meant that mines tended to be sucked back into the hull when they were launched; an obviously dangerous situation for a minelayer. As a result, she was rebuilt with a traditional cruiser, or rounded, stern, increasing the length by 19 ft (5.8 m).

As built, Adventure was 520 feet (158.50 m) long overall and 500 feet (152.40 m) between perpendiculars, with a beam of 59 feet (17.98 m) and a draught of 17 feet 2 inches (5.23 m) at deep load. Displacement was 6,740 long tons (6,848 t) standard and 8,370 long tons (8,504 t) deep load. She had a crew's complement of 383 and could carry 280 large mines or 340 small mines.

Propulsion was by plant as installed in the C-class cruisers, but to increase cruising efficiency a novel diesel-electric plant was trialled, the propellers being driven by either set of machinery through gearboxes. The diesel-electric plant was removed by 1941, along with the small diesel exhaust that had been trunked up the second funnel. Adventure's high topweight resulting from the mineload carried high up in her hull meant that typical cruiser type armament could not be fitted. Instead, four QF 4.7 in (120 mm) guns on high-angle mounts were carried in 'A', 'Q', 'X' and 'Y' positions, in hindsight a more useful arrangement. The anti-aircraft armament was completed by a single octuple multiple pom-pom in 'B' position (not fitted until the late 1930s) and a pair of quadruple .5 in (13 mm) Vickers machine guns.

By 1941, she had been fitted with Radar Type 291 air warning at the masthead, Radar Type 285 on the high-angle HACS Director Control Tower on the foremast spotting top and Radar Type 272 centimetric target indication on the foremast, below the spotting top. By 1944, nine 20 mm Oerlikon guns had been added, two of which had replaced the useless Vickers machine guns. Adventure was converted to a repair ship for landing craft for the Normandy landings.

== Service history ==
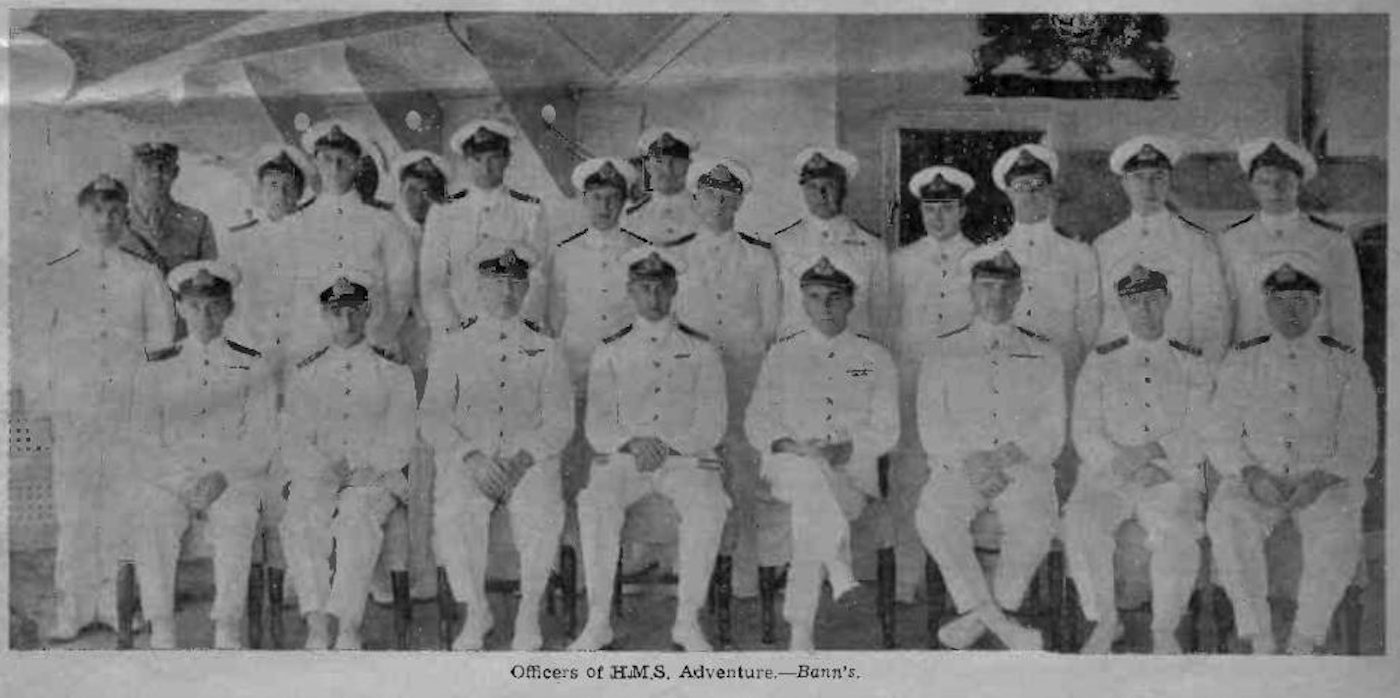
Officers of HMS Adventure in Shanghai in June 1938

On entering the service she joined the Atlantic Fleet. From 1931 to 1932, she underwent a refit. During this refit she received a rounded stern in place of the original square one. Adventure served on the China Station from 1935 to 1938.

=== World War Two ===
On the outbreak of the Second World War, the Royal Navy started laying a series of defensive minefields in British coastal waters and the English Channel. From 11 to 16 September 1939, Adventure, together with the coastal minelayer Plover and the converted train ferries Shepperton and Hampton, escorted by the cruiser Cairo and the destroyers of the 19th Destroyer Flotilla, laid 3119 mines in the Straits of Dover, sealing the east end of the Channel from penetration by German submarines. Following the completion of this operation, Adventure was deployed in laying mines off the Yorkshire coast.

On 13 November 1939, at 05.25, Adventure was badly damaged near the Tongue Light Vessel, in the Thames Estuary by an underwater explosion. 23 of her crew were killed or fatally injured. The bridge was wrecked and crew and fittings were thrown against bulkheads and down hatchways with lethal effect. She was successfully taken in tow to the Medway by tugs from Ramsgate, and later repaired at Chatham Dockyard. She had been en route from Grimsby to Portsmouth, and escorted by the Harwich-based destroyers Blanche and Basilisk. Blanche was also mined at 08:10 and sank with the loss of one man. Originally floating mines were blamed, but it soon transpired that magnetic mines laid by German destroyers a few hours before were responsible. Adventure returned to service in October 1940.

In January 1941 Adventure was again damaged by a mine in Liverpool Bay and was out of action for five months. In July she sailed with the task force involved in Operation EF, the raid of Kirkenes and Petsamo, in support of the Soviet Union following the German invasion. On 1 August she arrived in Murmansk with a cargo of parachute mines for use by the Russians.

In February 1942 Adventure was due to make another run to Murmansk, but was damaged in a collision in the Clyde. She was under repair for three months. In June 1942 Adventure took part in a decoy operation (Operation ES) to cover the passage of convoy PQ 17. Her captain from 1940–42 was Norman Vere Grace. In the winter of 1942/43 she made several fast re-supply missions to Gibraltar and the Mediterranean.

In April 1943 Adventure was involved in an operation to catch blockade runner Irene. On 10 April Irene was intercepted and sunk off the coast of Spain. In November she was taken in for conversion as a tender and repair ship for landing craft. In her four years of service as a mine-layer Adventure undertook some 20 mining operations, laying minefields throughout the Western Approaches and the North Sea.

During the Normandy landings in 1944 Adventure was deployed off Mulberry B as a support and repair vessel; she landed repair parties on 19 June for extensive salvage work on damaged landing craft.

=== Postwar ===
In 1945, Adventure was reduced to reserve, and in 1947 she was sold to Thos. W. Ward. and broken up at Briton Ferry.

Adventure was adopted by the City of Plymouth. Her name is carried by TS Adventure, the Harlow Sea Cadet unit (formerly known as TS Galatea, another reference to a RN Cruiser, HMS Galatea.

== See also ==
- USS Terror (CM-5)
- French cruiser Pluton
- Robert H. Smith-class destroyer
- Abdiel-class minelayer
