= SS Fort La Montee =

History

United Kingdom
- Name: SS Fort La Montee
- Operator: J. & C. Harrison Ltd., London for the Ministry of War Transport
- Builder: North Van Ship Repair, North Vancouver
- Completed: October 1942
- Fate: Caught fire and exploded on 4 August 1943

General characteristics
- Tonnage: 7,220 gross register tons (GRT); 3,911 NRT; 7,720 tonnes deadweight (DWT)
- Length: 439 ft 4 in (133.91 m)
- Beam: 57 ft 2 in (17.42 m)
- Draught: 27 ft (8.2 m)
- Propulsion: 1 × 3-cylinder triple expansion steam engine, 2,500 ihp (1,864 kW); 1 shaft
- Speed: 11 knots (20 km/h; 13 mph)
- Range: 11,400 nmi (21,100 km) at 10 kn (19 km/h; 12 mph)
- Complement: 115
- Armament: World War II : 1 × 4 in (100 mm) gun; 8 × 20 mm AA guns

SS Fort La Montee was a North Sands-class cargo ship, built during the Second World War and seeing use as an ammunition transport for the Allies in the Mediterranean Theatre.

== Construction ==
Fort La Montee was built in the yards of the North Vancouver Ship Repairs Ltd., North Vancouver for the British Government under a bare boat charter. She was completed in October 1942 and quickly pressed into service. She was assigned to be crewed and operated by J. & C. Harrison Ltd., London on behalf of the Ministry of War Transport. She was designated as an ammunition transport and dispatched into the Mediterranean Sea. The Allies had carried out a successful invasion of Sicily and needed constant resupplying.

Fort and Park ship were the Canadian equivalent of the American Liberty ships. All three shared a similar design by J.L. Thompson and Sons of Sunderland, England. Fort ships had a triple expansion steam engine and a single screw propeller.

== Destruction ==
Fort La Montee was in harbour at Algiers, preparing to sail for the invasion beaches on 4 August 1943. Before she could depart, a fire broke out aboard ship. Attempts were made to fight the blaze, whilst the harbour authorities, fearful of the risk of an explosion and damage to the other ships anchored there, ordered her to be towed out into deeper waters. Tugboats were able to attach lines and bring her out into the bay. The British A-class destroyer HMS Arrow had been in the harbour at the time and came alongside to help with the firefighting. Efforts to control the fire were eventually unsuccessful, and it spread to the forward compartments and into the holds where the ammunition was stored. The entire forepart of the burning freighter then blew up, sending flaming debris raining down over a large distance. Arrow was caught in the blast and she too caught fire, sustaining heavy damage and considerable casualties. She was subsequently declared a constructive total loss and never returned to service. The devastated Fort La Montee continued to burn. The aft section had to be sunk by gunfire from submarine HMS Saracen to prevent it blowing up. The remains of the forward section remained ablaze and burned for several days.

A similar disaster occurred in 1944, when Fort Stikine, another hastily built and converted ammunition ship managed for the Ministry of War Transport by the Port Line, caught fire and exploded at Bombay, destroying several vessels in the harbour.
