= HMS Basilisk (H11) =

Destroyer

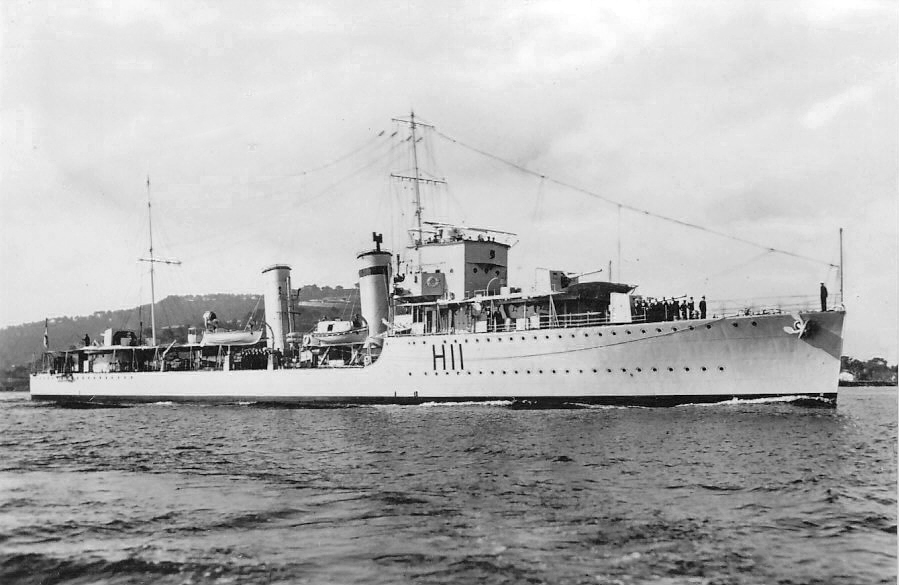

History

United Kingdom
- Name: HMS Basilisk
- Namesake: Basilisk
- Ordered: 4 March 1929
- Builder: John Brown & Company, Clydebank
- Yard number: 531
- Laid down: 19 August 1929
- Launched: 6 August 1930
- Completed: 4 March 1931
- Identification: Pennant number: H11
- Fate: Sunk by air attack, 1 June 1940

General characteristics (as built)
- Class & type: B-class destroyer
- Displacement: 1,360 long tons (1,380 t) (standard)
- Length: 323 ft (98.5 m) (o/a)
- Beam: 32 ft 3 in (9.8 m)
- Draught: 12 ft 3 in (3.7 m)
- Installed power: 3 × Admiralty 3-drum boilers; 34,000 shp (25,000 kW)
- Propulsion: 2 × shafts; 2 × geared steam turbines
- Speed: 35 knots (65 km/h; 40 mph)
- Range: 4,800 nmi (8,900 km; 5,500 mi) at 15 knots (28 km/h; 17 mph)
- Complement: 142 (wartime)
- Sensors & processing systems: Type 119 ASDIC
- Armament: 4 × single 4.7 in (120 mm) guns; 2 × single 2 pdr (40 mm (1.6 in)) AA guns; 2 × quadruple 21 in (533 mm) torpedo tubes; 1 × depth charge rail and 2 throwers; 20 × depth charges

HMS Basilisk was a B-class destroyer built for the Royal Navy around 1930. Initially assigned to the Mediterranean Fleet, she was transferred to the Home Fleet in 1936. The ship escorted convoys and conducted anti-submarine patrols early in World War II before participating in the Norwegian Campaign. Basilisk was sunk by German aircraft during the Dunkirk evacuation in 1940.

== Description ==
Basilisk displaced 1,360 long tons (1,380 t) at standard load and 1,790 long tons (1,820 t) at deep load. The ship had an overall length of 323 feet (98.5 m), a beam of 32 feet 3 inches (9.8 m) and a draught of 12 feet 3 inches (3.7 m). She was powered by a pair of Brown-Curtis geared steam turbines, each driving one shaft, using steam provided by three Admiralty 3-drum boilers. The turbines developed a total of 34,000 shaft horsepower (25,000 kW) and gave a maximum speed of 35 knots (65 km/h; 40 mph). Basilisk carried enough fuel oil to give her a range of 4,800 nautical miles (8,900 km; 5,500 mi) at 15 knots (28 km/h; 17 mph). The ship's complement was 134 officers and ratings, although it increased to 142 during wartime.

The B-class destroyers mounted four QF 4.7-inch (120 mm) Mk IX guns in single mounts. For anti-aircraft (AA) defence, they had two 40-millimetre (1.6 in) QF 2-pounder Mk II AA guns mounted on a platform between their funnels. The ships were fitted with eight above-water 21-inch (533 mm) torpedo tubes in a pair of quadruple mounts. One depth charge rail and two throwers were fitted; 20 depth charges were originally carried but this increased to 35 shortly after the war began. The ship was fitted with a Type 119 ASDIC set to detect submarines by reflections from sound waves beamed into the water.

== Construction and career ==
Basilisk was ordered on 4 March 1929 from John Brown & Company at Clydebank, Glasgow, under the 1928 Naval Programme. She was laid down on 19 August 1929 and launched on 6 August 1930, as the eighth RN ship to carry the name. Basilisk was completed on 4 March 1931 at a cost of £220,342, excluding items supplied by the Admiralty such as guns, ammunition and communications equipment. After her commissioning, she was assigned to the 4th Destroyer Flotilla with the Mediterranean Fleet until 1936. The flotilla was reassigned to the Home Fleet in September 1936.

On 6 August 1936, during the first weeks of the Spanish Civil War, Basilisk became involved in the aftermath of the naval action known as Convoy de la Victoria, when she was shelled and straddled by the ageing Spanish nationalist gunboat Dato while arriving in Gibraltar. The gunboat misidentified the British warship as a republican destroyer of the Churruca class. In February 1937 Basilisk arrived at the port of Málaga, Spain, captured a few days before by the Franco's forces. Basilisk's captain gained the release of Sir Peter Chalmers Mitchell, a British zoologist resident in Málaga, who was arrested by Franco's troops due to his support of the Spanish Republic. The ship became the emergency destroyer at Devonport in March 1939 and was assigned to the 19th Destroyer Flotilla when World War II began.

Basilisk spent the next two months escorting convoys and patrolling in the English Channel and the North Sea. The ship and her sister Blanche were escorting the minelayer Adventure on the morning of 13 November in the Thames Estuary when they entered a minefield laid the night before by several German destroyers. Adventure and Blanche both struck mines; the latter lost all power and later capsized whilst under tow. Basilisk continued to escort convoys and patrol until April 1940 when the Norwegian Campaign began. On 24 April, the ship, together with the destroyers Wren and Hesperus, escorted the battleship Resolution to Narvik on 24 April. In early May, she escorted the troopship Empress of Australia to Norway. Basilisk supported the Allied landings on 12–13 May at Bjerkvik during the Battle of Narvik.

The ship was transferred from the Western Approaches Command on 30 May to support the evacuation from Dunkirk. She made two trips to Dover during the following day and evacuated a total of 695 men. Basilisk returned to La Panne to load more troops on the morning of 1 June and was attacked three times by German bombers. One bomb from the first wave detonated inside the No. 3 boiler room, killed all of her boiler and engine room personnel, fractured her steam lines and knocked out all her machinery. Near misses from the same attack buckled the sides of her hull and her upper deck. The ship's torpedoes and depth charges were jettisoned to reduce topweight and the French fishing trawler Jolie Mascotte attempted to tow Basilisk. A second attack caused no further damage, but caused the French ship to drop the tow. The third attack around noon sank Basilisk in shallow water at 51°08′16″N 02°35′06″E. Jolie Mascotte and the destroyer Whitehall rescued eight officers and 123 crewmen from the ship. Whitehall then destroyed the wreck with gunfire and torpedoes.
