= Acaste (mythological nurse) =

Nurse of the daughters of Adrastus

In Greek mythology, Acaste (/əˈkæstiː/; Ancient Greek: Ἀκάστη Akastê), is the nurse and guardian of the daughters of king Adrastus of Argos.

== Thebaid ==
From Statius's Latin poem the Thebaid:

Then the aged king [Adrastus] bids Acaste be summoned – his daughters’ nurse and trusty guardian, chosen to keep ward on maiden modesty consecrated to lawful wedlock – and murmurs in her silent ear.
