= HMS Amazon (D39) =

Destroyer in Royal Navy

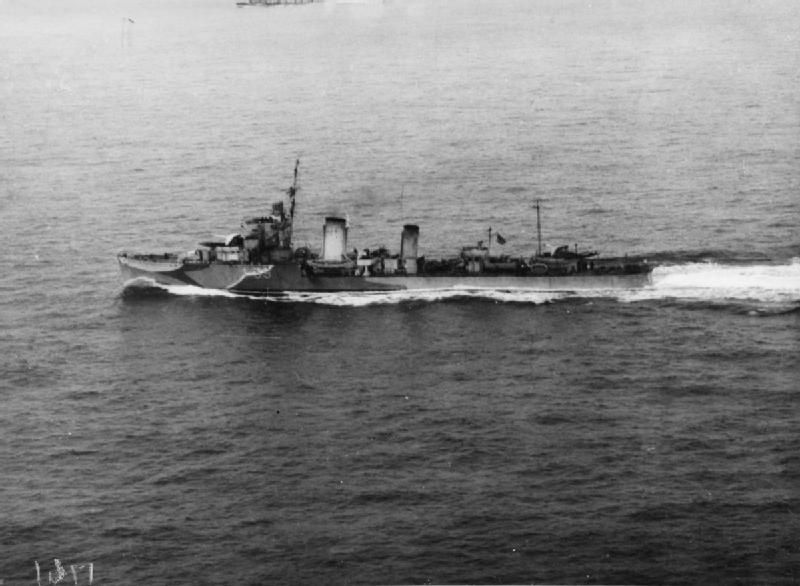
- HMS Amazon underway.

Class overview
- Preceded by: Admiralty Modified W class
- Succeeded by: A- and B class

History

United Kingdom
- Name: HMS Amazon
- Ordered: 16 July 1924 (contract 8 August 1924)
- Builder: John I Thornycroft, Woolston
- Laid down: 29 January 1925
- Launched: 27 January 1926
- Commissioned: 5 May 1927
- Fate: Sold for scrapping 25 October 1948

General characteristics
- Type: Destroyer
- Displacement: 1,350 long tons (1,372 t)
- Length: 311 ft 9 in (95.02 m) (p/p)
- Beam: 31 ft 6 in (9.60 m)
- Draught: 9 ft 6 in (2.90 m)
- Installed power: 42,000 shp (31,000 kW)
- Propulsion: 2 × Brown-Curtiss single-reduction geared steam turbines; 3 × 3-drum Yarrow-type boilers; 2 × shafts
- Speed: 37 kn (43 mph; 69 km/h)
- Range: 3,400 nmi (3,900 mi; 6,300 km) at 15 kn (17 mph; 28 km/h); 5,340 nmi (6,150 mi; 9,890 km) at 12.5 kn (14.4 mph; 23.2 km/h)
- Capacity: 433 short tons (393 t) fuel oil
- Complement: 138
- Armament: 4 × BL 4.7 in (120 mm) Mk I dual purpose guns; 2 × QF 2-pounder Mk.II anti-aircraft guns (2×1); 6 × 21 inch (533 mm) torpedo tubes (2×3)

HMS Amazon was a prototype design of destroyer ordered for the Royal Navy in 1924. She was designed and built by Thornycroft in response to an Admiralty request for a new design of destroyer incorporating the lessons and technological advances of the First World War. Their great rivals Yarrow produced a similar, competitive design — that of Ambuscade.

== Design and construction ==
Thornycroft made at least four designs for this ship, two being 310 ft (94 m) long (between perpendiculars) and two being 305 ft (93 m) long, with engine output varying from 28,000–33,000 shp (21,000–25,000 kW). Two designs were offered to the Admiralty, who required prototypes for subsequent destroyer construction. Thornycroft's "A" design used the maximum length allowed (310 ft between perpendiculars). The "B" design—which was adopted—reduced the length by 5 ft (1.5 m), using only one boiler room forward (as in their wartime Wishart).

Two designs for the machinery were prepared, plus a third outline design. The "B" design was modified in November 1924 after building had begun, to take machinery capable of giving an extra 2 kn (2.3 mph; 3.7 km/h) speed, which required extra length. After trials in 1926, the turbines were altered. Amazon was easily recognisable by her slab-sided funnels, characteristic of Thornycroft vessels. Most differences were internal. Unlike earlier designs, which were designed for home fleet service, they were designed for colonial use, with higher freeboard, cruising turbines and better ventilation.

Armament was identical to that in the V and W-class destroyers built late during the First World War, and comprised four 4.7 in (120 mm) BL Mark I on CP Mk.VI** mountings. These weapons were based on an Army field piece and had separate bagged charges and no Quick Firing (QF) mechanism. The mountings had half shields and a maximum elevation of 30°.

Fire control was by a 9 ft (2.7 m) base rangefinder and the new "Destroyer Director Control Tower" (DCT). The latter would be fitted to all subsequent Royal Navy destroyer designs from the C class up to the U class of 1942. Amazon reached only 34.5 kn (39.7 mph; 63.9 km/h) on her initial trials, and so was taken in hand for modifications. Her acceptance trials on 3 January 1927 resulted in a speed of 37.5 kn (43.2 mph; 69.5 km/h). In a later trial on the Skelmorlie Mile in March 1927, she made 38.71 kn (44.55 mph; 71.69 km/h) on her fastest run and 37.34 kn (42.97 mph; 69.15 km/h) on the slowest, with an average engine output of 41,559 shp (30,991 kW). This was at nearly 300 long tons (305 t) below her deep displacement. Her sea speed in load condition in service was only 31 kn (36 mph; 57 km/h). She was completed on 5 May 1927.

Such was the Navy's satisfaction with the design that they formed the basis of the next 77 destroyers, often known as the "interwar standard", until the Tribal class of 1936. Amazon was fitted out for service during the Second World War as a convoy escort. Her "A" and "Y" 4.7 in guns and after set of torpedo tubes were removed. A 12-pounder 3 in (76 mm) Mk.V anti-aircraft gun was added in place of the torpedoes (to remedy the lack of a heavy anti-aircraft weapon) and a "Hedgehog" anti-submarine projector was added on the forecastle. Type 286P radar was added at the masthead, and the rangefinder and director on the bridge were replaced with a centimetric Type 271 for detecting surfaced submarines. The 2-pounder pom-poms were replaced with 20 mm (0.79 in) Oerlikon anti-aircraft cannons, with a further pair added in the bridge wings. In 1943, the 12-pounder gun and the remaining torpedo tubes were removed to allow a 10-round depth charge pattern to be carried, and Type 291 radar replaced her Type 286P.

== Service history ==
She spent most of the war up to 1942 escorting North Atlantic and Russian convoys, moving to the Mediterranean and taking part in Operation Pedestal, until returning to home waters in 1943 for the duration of the war. By 1944 she was reduced to acting as a target and was broken up by West of Scotland Shipbreaking at Troon in 1949.

The ship was depicted on a Maltese postage stamp that was issued on 10 August 2012 commemorating the 70th anniversary of Operation Pedestal.
