= Operation Alphabet =

1940 evacuation of Allied troops from Narvik during the Nazi invasion of Norway

Coordinates: 68.4333°N 17.4167°E

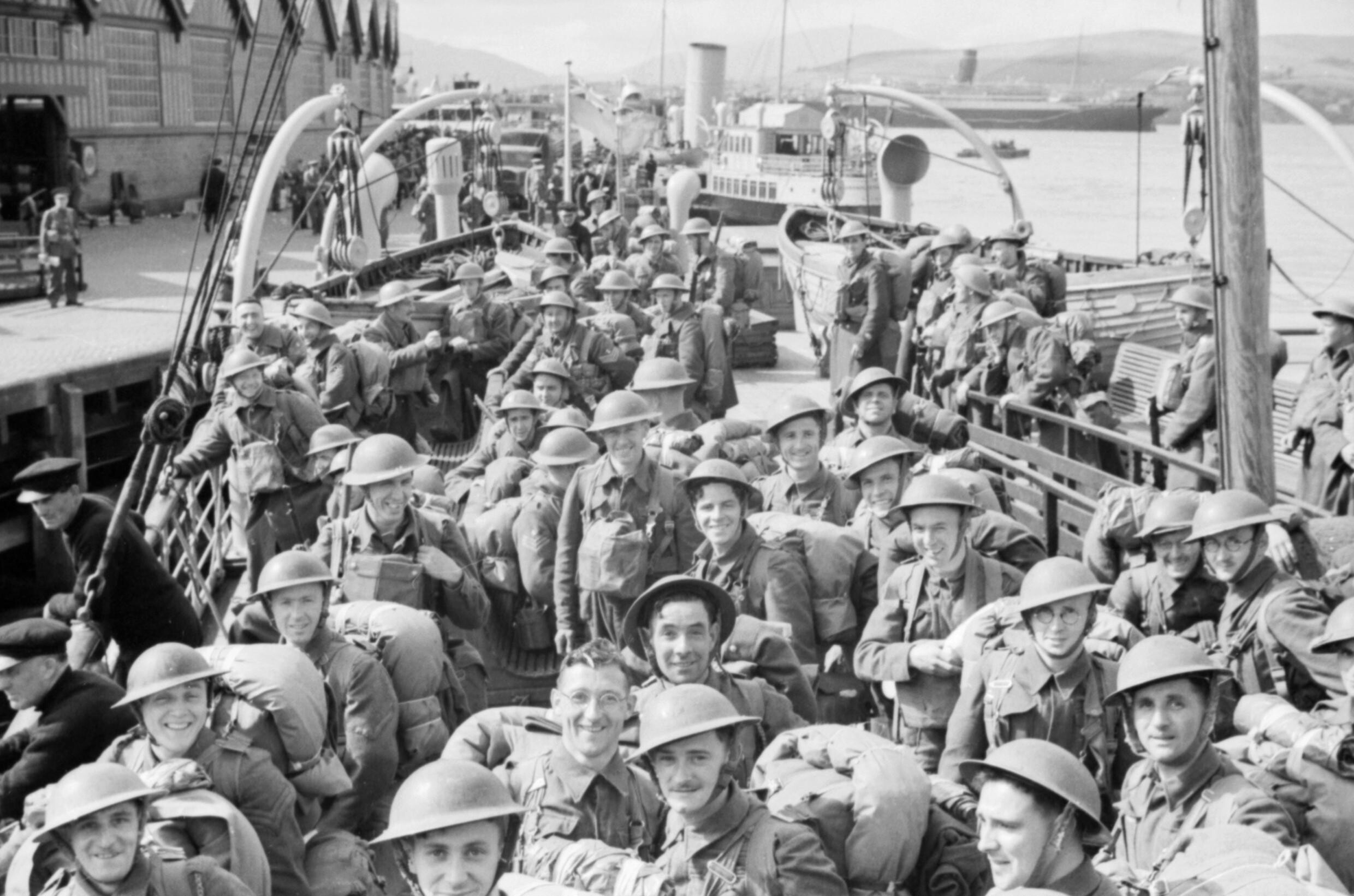
- British troops returning to the UK at Greenock in June 1940.
| Date | June 4–8, 1940 (2 days) |
| Location | Narvik, Norway |
| Result | Allied evacuation complete, Norwegian defeat & surrender |

Belligerents
| United Kingdom; France; Poland; Norway | Germany |

Commanders and leaders
| (United Kingdom) William Boyle (Norway) Carl Gustav Fleischer | (Nazi Germany) Eduard Dietl |

Operation Alphabet was an evacuation, authorised on 24 May 1940, of Allied (British, French and Polish) troops from the harbour of Narvik in northern Norway marking the success of Operation Weserübung (the German invasion of 9 April) and the end of the Allied campaign in Norway during World War II. The evacuation was completed by 8 June.

The evacuation was prompted by the Wehrmacht's assault on Belgium, the Netherlands, Luxembourg and France in the spring of 1940, which reduced the relative importance of Germany's iron ore provision and of Scandinavia. Several nights after the final military evacuation, the civilians of the town were rescued by British Sub-Lieutenant Patrick Dalzel-Job. Against orders, he organised local fishing boats to remove the population just before a German reprisal bombing. Much of the town was destroyed but only four people were killed.

A consequence of the evacuation of Allied troops from Norway was that Sweden's and Finland's position vis-à-vis Nazi Germany was weakened. An agreement was reached in June leading to extensive transfers of (unarmed) Wehrmacht troops on Swedish railways – probably Sweden's chief digression from her policy of neutrality between the parties of the war – and in August Finland concluded a secret agreement according to which Finland could acquire weapons through Germany and Germany could transfer (armed) troops by truck through northernmost Finland. Nazi Germany and the Soviet Union, still united by the Molotov–Ribbentrop Pact, had excluded other international powers from influence in Northern Europe.

== See also ==
- List of British military equipment of World War II
- List of French military equipment of World War II
- List of Norwegian military equipment of World War II
- List of German military equipment of World War II

== Sources ==
- Hauge, Andreas (1995) Kampene i Norge 1940 (Sandefjord: Krigshistorisk Forlag) ISBN 82-993369-0-2 Norwegian
- Kristiansen, Trond (2006) Fjordkrigen – Sjømilitær motstand mot den tyske invasjonsflåten i 1940 (Harstad: Forlaget Kristiansen) ISBN 82-997054-2-8 Norwegian
