= QF 4.7-inch Mk IX & XII naval gun =

QF 4.7 inch Mark IX & Mark XII
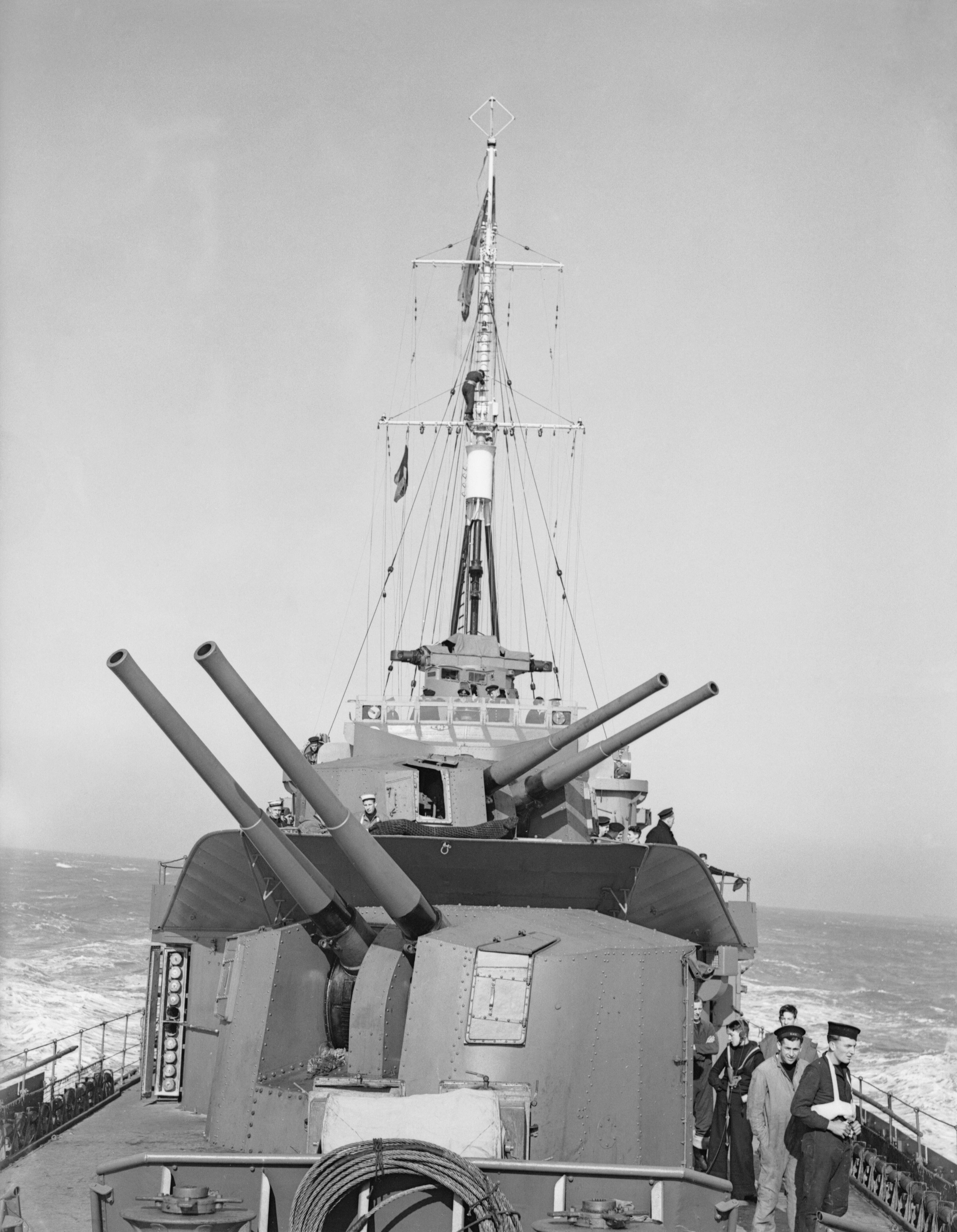
- Two twins 4.7 inch Mk XII guns on CP Mk XIX mounting on HMS Kelvin
- Type: Naval gun
- Place of origin: United Kingdom

Service history
- In service: 1928–1970?
- Used by: Royal Navy; Royal Canadian Navy; Royal Australian Navy; Royal Hellenic Navy; Royal Netherlands Navy; Polish Navy; Royal Norwegian Navy; Turkish Navy; Dominican Navy; Argentine Navy; Brazilian Navy
- Wars: World War II; Korean War

Production history
- No. built: 742 (Mk IX); 372 (Mk XII)

Specifications
- Mass: 2.963–2.984 long tons (3,011–3,032 kg) (Mk IX); 3.238–3.245 long tons (3,290–3,297 kg) (Mk XII)
- Length: 220.62 in (5.60 m) (Mk IX); 224.08 in (5.69 m) (Mk XII)
- Barrel length: Bore: 212.58 in (5.40 m), 45 (calibres)
- Shell: Separate loading cased charge
- Shell weight: 50 pounds (22.7 kg) SAP or HE
- Calibre: 4.724 inches (120 mm)
- Breech: Semi-automatic horizontal sliding-block
- Recoil: Hydro-pneumatic
- Elevation: Varied by mounting
- Rate of fire: about 15 rounds per minute
- Muzzle velocity: 2,650 ft/s (810 m/s)
- Maximum firing range: 16,970 yards (15,520 m) at 40°

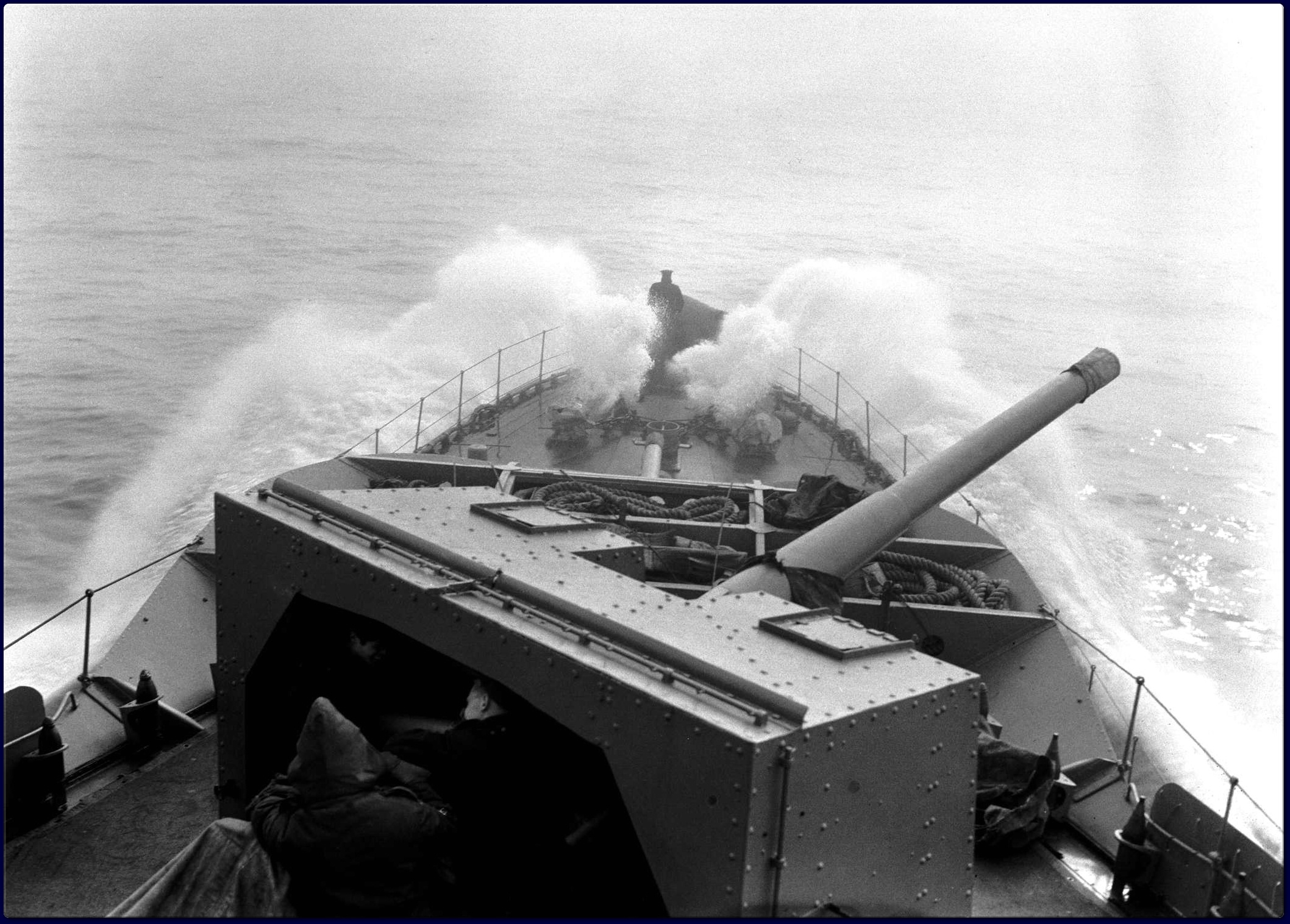
Single Mk IX gun on HMCS Assiniboine with gunners sheltering behind the shield

The 4.7 inch QF Mark IX and Mark XII were 45-calibre, 4.7-inch (120 mm) naval guns which armed the majority of Royal Navy and Commonwealth destroyers in World War II, and were exported to many countries after World War II as the destroyers they were mounted on were sold off.

== Description and history ==
These guns succeeded the similar World War I-era BL 4.7 inch gun, changing the cartridges from BL silk bags to separate QF in brass cases and a new horizontal sliding-block breech mechanism.

Mark IX was deployed in single mountings CP Mk XIV on the A-class destroyers of 1930 and on most subsequent destroyer classes up to and including the R class of 1942.

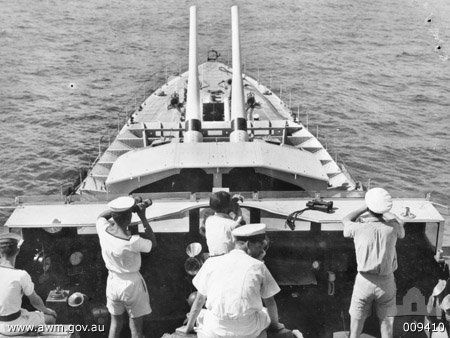
Twin Mk XII guns on HMAS Nizam

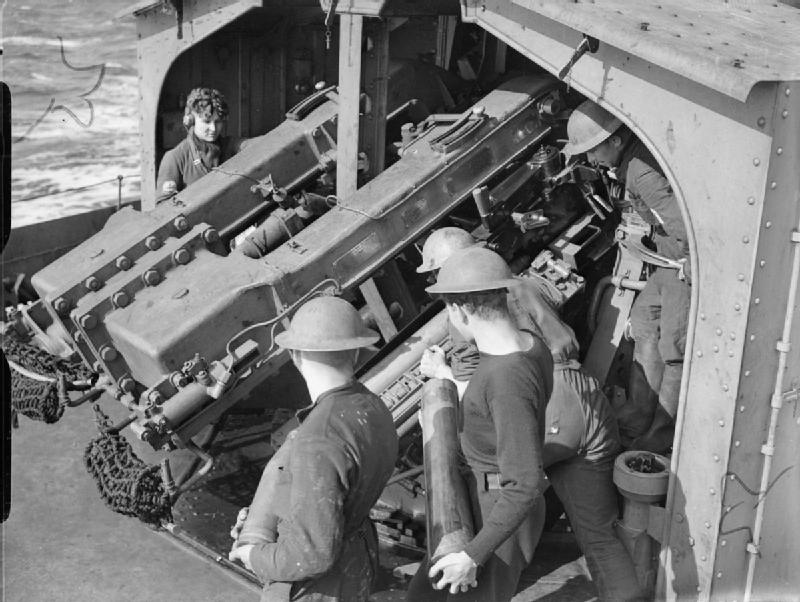
A twin Mk.XII mounting on HMS Javelin. The cylindrical Fuse Setting Pedestal is clearly visible on the right, at waist height.

The almost-identical Mk XII gun was deployed in twin mountings CP Mk XIX on the Tribal-class destroyers of 1936 and J, K and N classes of 1938. This mounting limited the maximum elevation to 40 degrees, but all twin CP Mk XIX were dual-purpose mountings and were equipped with Fuze Setting Pedestals or Mk V Fuze Setting Trays, to allow the mountings to be fired against aircraft while being controlled by the Fuze Keeping Clock (FKC) fire control computer. Typical maximum rate of fire was twelve rounds per gun, per minute. During gunnery trials in 1930, HMS Basilisk was able to fire "...five rounds in 17 seconds." The Mk XII gun fired a 50 lb (23 kg) shell and used a separate cartridge, with shell and cartridge being loaded via a loading tray, with power ramming, elevation, and traverse. The maximum range at 40 degrees elevation was 16,970 yards (15,520 m) fired at the new gun muzzle velocity of 2,650 fps (808 m/s). The 40-degree elevation was justified on the grounds that destroyers would be screening the battle-fleet during aerial attack, and 40 degrees elevation was adequate to engage aircraft that were concentrating their attack on other ships.

Admiral Sir Philip Vian describes the use of Tribal-class destroyer mounted Mk XII guns against aircraft during the campaign in Norwegian waters, from April to June 1940:

It became clear at once that in an attack from the air in narrow waters flanked by mountains, the cards were held by the aircraft. There was too little sea-room for full freedom of manoeuvre, and the aircraft's approach was screened by the rock walls. As often as not, when they did come into view it was at such an angle that our 4.7-inch guns, whose maximum elevation was only forty degrees, could not reach them... Aandalsnes is approached through the Romsdal Fiord, and lies forty miles from the entrance, off which we arrived on the 24th April. The daylight passage of the convoy and escort through this waterway, speed five knots, on a steady course and with mountains rising steeply either side, presented an alluring invitation to enemy aircraft. Junkers attacks persisted to the end, but the fire of the destroyers, although limited to an elevation of forty degrees, was enough to keep the enemy just too high for their standard of marksmanship. Not a ship received a direct hit, though some were damaged by the splinters from near misses.

The S class introduced the CP (central pivot) single Mark XXII mounting for the QF Mark XII 4.7 in gun. This new mounting had a shield with a sharply raked front, to allow increased elevation (to 55 degrees), contrasting noticeably with the vertical front of the previous CP Mark XVIII, and easily differentiated the S class onwards from their predecessors. Savage was the exception in this respect, being fitted with QF 4.5 inch guns; a twin mounting forward and two singles aft.

The 4.7 inch calibre was superseded by QF 4.5 in (113 mm) Mk.IV guns on the Z-class destroyers in 1943. The new 4.5 inch guns all had 55-degree elevation mounts and fired a shell slightly heavier than that of 4.7-inch Mk IX and XII guns, but slightly lighter than that fired by the 4.7 inch Mk XI gun.

== Ammunition ==
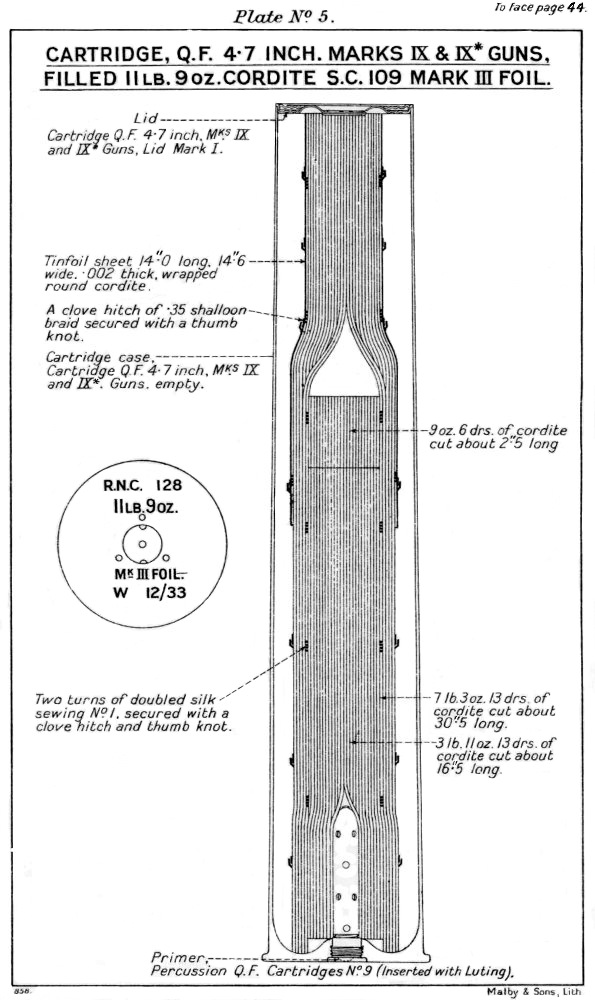
Cartridge

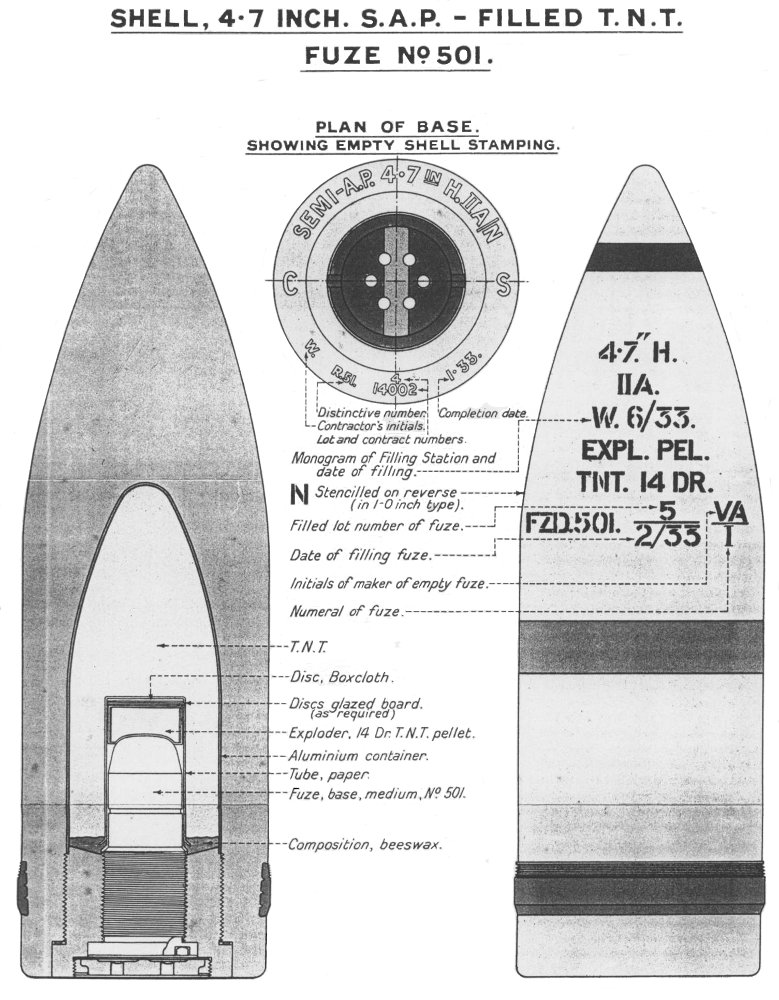
Mk IIA S.A.P. (semi armour-piercing) shell

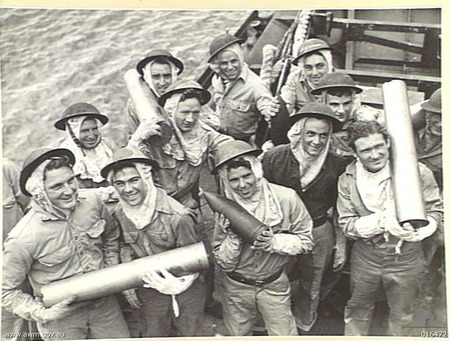
Australian gunners with cartridge cases and shell, January 1944

== Gun mountings ==
Mounting	Elevation	Weight w/o shield	Shield thickness	Shield weight	Number of guns
CPXIV	-10° to +30°	8.64 tons / 8,781 kg	0.144 in / 3.7 mm	0.85 tons / 864 kg	1
CPXVI	-10° to +30°	8.829 tons / 8,971 kg	unknown	unknown	1
CPXVII	-10° to +40°	8.829 tons / 8,971 kg	0.125 in / 3.2 mm	0.85 tons / 864 kg	1
CPXVIII	-10° to +40°	9.544 tons / 9,697 kg	0.125 in / 3.2 mm	1.163 tons / 1,182 kg	1
CPXIX	-10° to +40°	22.93 tons / 23,298 kg	unknown	2.55 tons / 2,591 kg	2
CPXXII	-10° to +55°	11.58 tons / 11,766 kg	0.375 in / 9.5 mm	1.813 tons / 1,842 kg	1

== Weapons of comparable role, performance and era ==
- 12.7 cm SK C/34 naval gun : equivalent German destroyer gun, firing slightly heavier shell
- 5"/38 caliber gun : approximate US equivalent, firing a slightly heavier shell

== Bibliography ==
- Campbell, John (1985). Naval Weapons of World War II. Annapolis, Maryland: Naval Institute Press. ISBN 0-87021-459-4.
- Hodges, Peter; Friedman, Norman (1979). Destroyer Weapons of World War 2. London: Conway Maritime Press. ISBN 0-87021-929-4.
- March, Edgar J. (1966). British Destroyers: A History of Development, 1892–1953; Drawn by Admiralty Permission From Official Records & Returns, Ships' Covers & Building Plans. London: Seeley Service. OCLC 164893555.
