= Doris Ida Miller =

Canadian biomechanist

- Born: 1939
- Education: University of Toronto (Bachelor of Physical & Health Education) University of Oregon (Masters) The Pennsylvania State University (PhD)
- Alma mater: Pennsylvania State University
- Known for: Sports biomechanics and diving coaching

Doris Ida Miller (born 1939) is a Canadian biomechanist and Professor Emeritus at Western University, who is known for her research in sports biomechanics, most specifically diving. She was the first female council member of the International Society of Biomechanics, a founding member and President of the American Society of Biomechanics (1983-1984), a founding member of the Canadian Society for Biomechanics, a Fellow of the National Academy of Kinesiology, and a Fellow of the International Society of Biomechanics in Sports.

== Education ==
Miller earned a Bachelor of Physical and Health Education from the University of Toronto in 1961, a master's degree from the University of Oregon in 1964, and a PhD degree from Pennsylvania State University in 1970 as the first graduate of the university's biomechanics program.

Her PhD thesis, titled A computer simulation of the airborne phase of diving, was conducted under the supervision of Richard Nelson. Her computational model was accompanied by computer graphics that required more than 3,000 punch cards when implemented as a computer mainframe program.

Separate from her studies in biomechanics, Miller also earned a Master's in Divinity from the University of Victoria in 1990.

== Career ==
Miller held faculty positions at the University of Toronto (1961-1963), the University of Saskatchewan (1964-1967 and 1970-1973), the University of Washington (1973-1984), and finally the University of Western Ontario (now Western University, 1984–2000) where she is Professor Emerita.

In addition to her academic career, Miller was engaged in the world of competitive diving. She was a diving coach at the University of Saskatchewan prior to her PhD. Later, she was a member of USA Diving's Performance Enhancement Team (2003-2009) and biomechanist for the Olympic Medal Program (1983- 2009).

Miller was a member of the first Executive Council of the International Society of Biomechanics (1975-1979) and was the first woman to serve on the council. She was a founding member of the American Society of Biomechanics, and Canadian Society for Biomechanics, and served as President of the American Society of Biomechanics from 1983 to 1984.

== Research ==
Miller's research area is sports biomechanics with a primary focus is on the biomechanics of diving, and additional research across a range of sports including figure skating, sprinting and amputee running. As a graduate student at Pennsylvania State University, and alongside the biomechanist Micheline Gagnon, Miller manually digitized 16-mm high-speed film recordings of sprinters for her thesis work, and pioneered early computer graphics for animating motion capture data using punch cards. She completed her PhD, titled "A computer simulation of the airborne phase of diving" in 1970.

Miller collected live biomechanical data during several international diving competitions, most notably the 1986 World Aquatics Championships and the 1996 Olympic Games, which included embedding force platforms into 10-meter diving towers. On the topic of Miller's data acquisition methods, Jill McNitt-Gray commented that,

“Few have conquered the many obstacles encountered during competition including those requiring video recording from rooftops in near tropical storm conditions or from flooded underwater window locations.”

As a result of these efforts, data from the 1996 Olympic Games led to a Diving Video Database analysis program that was a forerunner to later commercial software such as Dartfish.

During a project with Sport Canada from 1988 up to the 1992 Olympic Games, Miller helped develop analytical programs by collecting a database of national and international-level dives, which she used to create instructional modules for competitive diving coaches. This meant Miller and her team could equip coaches with a software that provided rapid feedback on the biomechanics their athletes' dives.

== Honors and awards ==
The National Academy of Kinesiology, formerly the American Academy of Physical Education and the American Academy of Kinesiology and Physical Education, inducted Miller as Fellow #288 in 1982 while she was on faculty at the University of Washington. Her status within the Academy changed to Corresponding Fellow upon her return to Canada in 1984.

In 2000, she received the International Swimming Hall of Fame's 2000 Paragon Award for Competitive Diving.

The International Society of Biomechanics in Sports named Miller the Geoffrey Dyson Lecturer, the society's most prestigious award, in 1992 and elected her a Fellow in 2002.

The International Society of Biomechanics awarded her Honorary Membership in 2009 and she remains one of two women to have received this honour to date.

Also in 2009, the American Society of Biomechanics awarded her the Jim Hay Memorial Award which recognizes "originality, quality, and depth of biomechanics research" relevant to sport and exercise.

== Selected publications ==
- Miller, Doris I.; Nelson, Richard C. (1973). Biomechanics of sport: a research approach. Philadelphia: Lea & Febiger. ISBN 978-0-8121-0431-8.
- Miller, Doris I. (1975). "Biomechanics of Swimming". Exercise and Sport Sciences Reviews. 3 (1): 219–248. doi:10.1249/00003677-197500030-00011. ISSN 0091-6331. PMID 1175667.
- Munro, Carolyn F.; Miller, Doris I.; Fuglevand, Andrew J. (1987-01-01). "Ground reaction forces in running: A reexamination". Journal of Biomechanics. 20 (2): 147–155. doi:10.1016/0021-9290(87)90306-X. ISSN 0021-9290. PMID 3571295.
- Miller, Doris I. (1980). "Body Segment Contributions to Sport Skill Performance: Two Contrasting Approaches". Research Quarterly for Exercise and Sport. 51 (1): 219–233. doi:10.1080/02701367.1980.10609284. ISSN 0270-1367. PMID 6765896.
- Miller, Doris I. (1987-01-01). "Resultant lower extremity joint moments in below-knee amputees during running stance". Journal of Biomechanics. 20 (5): 529–541. doi:10.1016/0021-9290(87)90253-3. ISSN 0021-9290. PMID 3611127.
- Miller, Doris I. (2021-12-01). "Dr. Richard C. Nelson: Behind the Scenes". Journal of Applied Biomechanics. 37 (6): 585–586. doi:10.1123/jab.2021-0295. ISSN 1065-8483. PMID 34872069.
