= Sandra Olney =

Canadian biomechanist

- Education: McGill University (Bachelor of Science) Queen's University (Master of Education) University of Waterloo (PhD)
- Alma mater: University of Waterloo
- Known for: Biomechanics and rehabilitation therapy

Sandra Olney (born 1942) is a Canadian biomechanist and Professor emeritus at Queen's University at Kingston. She is best known for her research contributions in the areas of biomechanics and rehabilitation and for her leading role with the International Society of Biomechanics (ISB).

== Education ==
Olney received her Bachelor of Science (Physical and Occupational Therapy) from McGill University in 1964 and her Master of Education from Queen's University in 1974.

Olney pursued her Ph.D. in Biomechanics at the University of Waterloo under the supervision of David A. Winter. Her dissertation, entitled "Predictions of knee and ankle moments of force in walking from EMG and kinematic data," presented a model for calculating instantaneous joint moments during walking using processed electromyography signals, instantaneous joint angles, and instantaneous angular velocities.

== Career ==
Olney worked clinically as a physical therapist following her graduation from McGill University in both Australia and Canada, including as a Research Physical Therapist at Queen's University.

Following the completion of her PhD, Olney worked as a faculty member in the School of Rehabilitation Therapy at Queen's University. This included serving as the Director of the School as well as the Associate Dean for the Faculty of Health Sciences at the university. Olney established the school's first biomechanics research group and helped to develop the interdisciplinary "Clinical Mechanics Group" which today is the Centre for Health Innovation at Queen's University.

Olney served on the ISB Executive Council as the Education Officer (1991–97) and worked alongside Micheline Gagnon to support biomechanical research in economically developing countries. She was elected as the first female President of the ISB in 1999 and served as President-Elect (1999–2001), President (2001–03), and Past-President (2003–05). Her 2003 President's report included the first statistical references to gender imbalances within the ISB.

Olney is currently a professor emeritus at the School of Rehabilitation Therapy at Queen's University.

== Research ==
Olney's research area is rehabilitation biomechanics, with a main emphasis on gait following stroke. Other areas of interest include gait in cerebral palsy and around joint replacements.

== Selected publications ==
- Olney, Sandra J., and David A. Winter. "Predictions of knee and ankle moments of force in walking from EMG and kinematic data." Journal of biomechanics 18.1 (1985): 9-20. https://doi.org/10.1016/0021-9290(85)90041-7
- Olney, Sandra J., MacPhail, HE Ann, Hedden, Douglas M., and William F. Boyce. "Work and Power in Hemiplegic Cerebral Palsy Gait". Physical Therapy. 70.7 (1990): 431–438. https://doi.org/10.1093/ptj/70.7.431
- Olney, Sandra J., et al. "Work and power in gait of stroke patients." Archives of physical medicine and rehabilitation 72.5 (1991): 309–314. https://www.archives-pmr.org/article/0003-9993(91)90247-G/abstract
- Olney, Sandra J., Malcolm P. Griffin, and Ian D. McBride. "Temporal, kinematic, and kinetic variables related to gait speed in subjects with hemiplegia: a regression approach." Physical therapy 74.9 (1994): 872. https://doi.org/10.1093/ptj/74.9.872
- Olney, Sandra J., and Carol Richards. "Hemiparetic gait following stroke. Part I: Characteristics." Gait & posture 4.2 (1996): 136–148. https://doi.org/10.1016/0966-6362(96)01063-6
- Richards, Carol L., and Sandra J. Olney. "Hemiparetic gait following stroke. Part II: Recovery and physical therapy." Gait & posture 4.2 (1996): 149–162. https://doi.org/10.1016/0966-6362(96)01064-8
- Olney, Sandra J., et al. "A randomized controlled trial of supervised versus unsupervised exercise programs for ambulatory stroke survivors." Stroke 37.2 (2006): 476–481. https://doi.org/10.1161/01.STR.0000199061.85897.b7

== Honours and awards ==
Olney was awarded an honorary doctorate from Rīga Stradiņš University in 2004, recognizing her "significant contribution to the creation and introduction of an organised rehabilitation model in the social environment in Latvia" among other accomplishments.

The Faculty of Applied Health Sciences at the University of Waterloo recognized Olney with their Alumni Achievement Award in 2019, citing her "contributions to the field of rehabilitation therapy, including the development and implementation of rehabilitation programs around the world through her involvement with the International Centre for the Advancement of Community-based Rehabilitation".
