= Nootka =

Nootka may refer to:

- Nuu-chah-nulth or Nootka, an indigenous people in Canada's Pacific Northwest
- Nuu-chah-nulth language or Nootka, spoken by the above

== Places in British Columbia, Canada ==
- Nootka Sound
- Nootka Island
- Nootka Fault

== Plants ==
- Puccinellia nutkaensis, a grass species also called Nootka alkaligrass
- Cupressus nootkatensis, a tree species also known as Nootka cypress
- Rosa nutkana, a perennial shrub also called Nootka rose
- Lupinus nootkatensis, a perennial plant also known as Nootka lupine

== Other uses ==
- HMCS Nootka (J35), a Royal Canadian Navy Second World War minesweeper
- HMCS Nootka (R96), a Royal Canadian Navy destroyer
- Nootka Jargon, a Nootka (Nuu-chah-nulth) pidgin used as a trade language along the Pacific Northwest coast
- Nootka Elementary School, in Vancouver, British Columbia

== See also ==
- Nootka Crisis, an 18th-century dispute involving the Nuu-chah-nulth Nation, the Spanish Empire, the Kingdom of Great Britain and the fledgling United States of America
- Nootka Conventions, three treaties signed in the 1790s between Spain and Great Britain, defusing the Nootka Crisis
