= HMCS Nootka =

Several Canadian naval units have been named HMCS Nootka.

- HMCS Nootka (J35) was a Fundy-class minesweeper that served with the Royal Canadian Navy from 1938 to 1943 before being renamed HMCS Nanoose (J35) and decommissioned in 1945.
- HMCS Nootka (R96) was a Tribal-class destroyer that served the Royal Canadian Navy from 1946 to 1964.

== Battle honours ==
- Korea 1951–52
