= International Society of Biomechanics in Sports =

International biomechanics organization

- Formation: 7 May 1983
- Website: https://isbs.org/

The International Society of Biomechanics in Sports, commonly known as the ISBS, is a society dedicated to promoting biomechanics in sports and it is made up of members from around the world. It is affiliated with the International Society of Biomechanics

The primary purposes of the society are the provide a forum for the exchange of ideas between sports biomechanists and people working within sports, to bridge the gap between researchers and practitioners and the gather and disseminate information, and related materials, on biomechanics and sports.

== History ==
The first ISBS conference was held in San Diego, in California, in June 1982 with 123 participants. This conference showed the need for the society and the organization was officially formed on 7 May 1983.

They now hold annual conferences around the world and offer numerous awards and fellowships to recognize the achievements of their members. These awards include the Hans Gros Emerging Researcher Award which recognizes early career researchers and the Geoffrey Dyson Award which recognizes a researchers contribution throughout their career; this award is viewed as being the most prestigious offered by the ISBS.

== Journal ==
The official scientific journal of the society is Sports Biomechanics which began being published in 2002. It is designed to contribute to knowledge regarding how to improve sports performance and reduce injury.

== People associated with the ISBS ==
- Alexandra Atack, a British biomechanist who served on the board of directors from 2020–2022 where she worked on evaluating the society's women's mentor circles.
- Sophie Burton, a British biomechanist who serves on the Equity, Diversity, and Inclusion Committee of the society.
- Ruth Glassow, an American movement scientist and biomechanist who was made a fellow of the ISBS after her death in 1989.
- Patria Hume, a sports biomechanics academic from New Zealand who is a fellow of the society and winner of the 2016 Geoffrey Dyson Award.
- Bruce Mason, an Australian biomechanist and sports scientist and winner of the 2000 Geoffrey Dyson Award.
- Jill L. McNitt-Gray, an American biomechanist and winner of the 2023 Geoffrey Dyson Award.
- Doris Ida Miller, a Canadian biomechanist, winner of the 1992 Geoffrey Dyson Award, and Fellow of the Society from the Class of 2002.
- Gerda Strutzenberger, an Austrian biomechanist and 2012 winner of the Hans Gros Award.
