= Sophie Burton (biomechanist) =

British biomechanist and academic

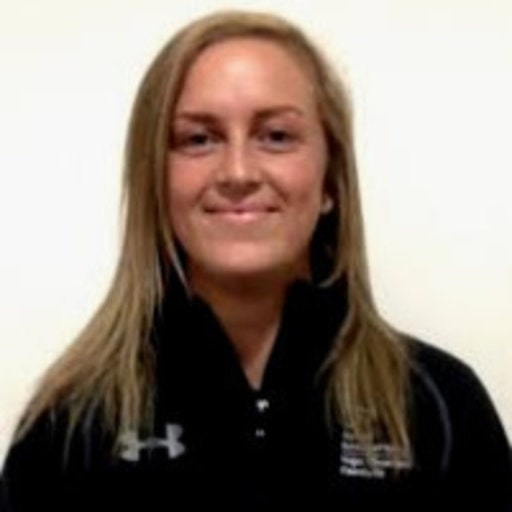
- Organization: Cardiff Metropolitan University
- Known for: Sport biomechanics, gymnastics research
- Notable work: https://orcid.org/0000-0003-4395-9062
- Title: Senior Lecturer in Sport and Exercise Biomechanics

Sophie Burton is a British biomechanist and senior lecturer in sport and exercise biomechanics at Cardiff Metropolitan University. She is a member of the Centre for Applied Sports Science & Medicine (CASSM). Her research focuses on sport biomechanics with particular interest in high-performance sports, including gymnastics.

== Education ==
Burton completed a BSc in Sport and Exercise Science with First-Class Honours. She is pursuing a PhD (MPhil/PhD) in Sport Biomechanics at Cardiff Metropolitan University. She also holds a Postgraduate Certificate in Teaching and Academic Practice and is a Fellow of the Higher Education Academy.

== Academic career ==
Burton teaches modules in sport and exercise biomechanics at Cardiff Metropolitan University, combining theoretical instruction with practical biomechanics laboratory techniques. She is a member of the Athena SWAN committee at her institution and serves on the Equity, Diversity, and Inclusion Committee of the International Society of Biomechanics in Sports.

== Research ==
Her research interests include the biomechanics of gymnastics, movement analysis in high-performance athletes, and technical development in junior and senior athletes. She has collaborated on international studies analyzing the high bar longswing in gymnasts across age groups.

== Selected publications ==
- Burton, S., Newell, K. N., Exell, T., Williams, G. K. R., & Irwin, G. (2023). "The evolving high bar longswing in elite gymnasts of three age groups." Journal of Sports Sciences, 41(24), 2922–2930. https://doi.org/10.1080/02640414.2023.2259201
- Kean, C. O., Burton, S., Janssen, I., Brackley, V., & Atack, A. C. (2024). "Empowering women in sports biomechanics: exploring the impact of mentor circles." Sports Biomechanics. https://doi.org/10.1080/14763141.2024.2388586
- Kean, Crystal O.; Burton, Sophie; Janssen, Ina; Brackley, Victoria; Atack, Alexandra C. (2024). "Empowering women in sports biomechanics: exploring the impact of mentor circles". Sports Biomechanics: 1–15. doi:10.1080/14763141.2024.2388586. PMID 39212154.

== Affiliations ==
- Cardiff Metropolitan University
- Centre for Applied Sports Science & Medicine (CASSM)
- International Society of Biomechanics in Sports (ISBS)

== See also ==
- Sport biomechanics
- Gymnastics
- Biomechanics
