= Lathrop Hall =

- U.S. National Register of Historic Places
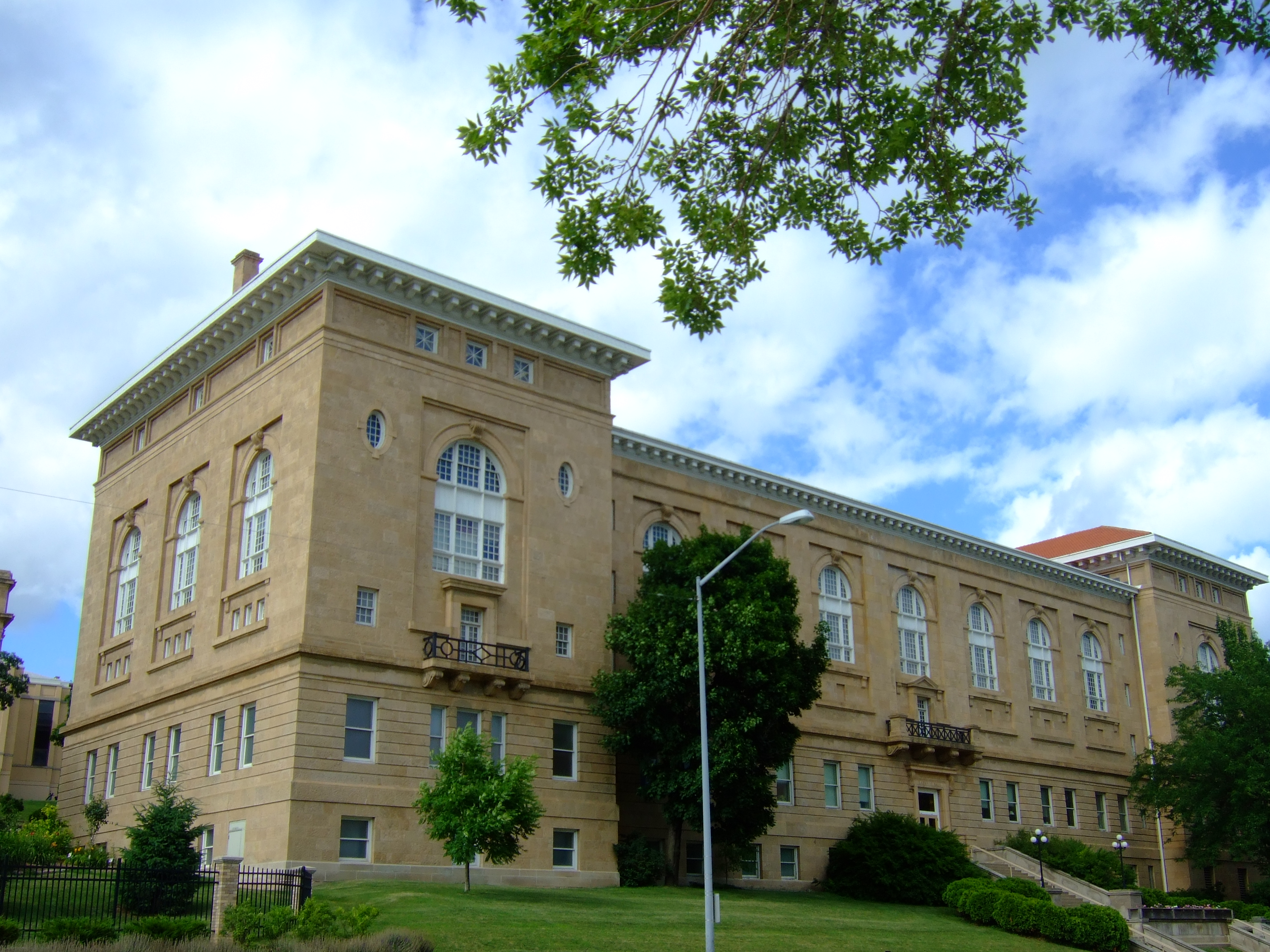
- Lathrop Hall
- Location: 1050 University Ave. Madison, Wisconsin
- Coordinates: 43.07367°N 89.40301°W
- Architect: Cret, Laird and Peabody
- NRHP reference No.: 85001503
- Added to NRHP: July 11, 1985

Lathrop Hall was built in 1908 as a women's gym and union of the University of Wisconsin-Madison in Madison, Wisconsin. In 1985 it was added to the National Register of Historic Places, significant because it is the site of founding of the Athletic Conference of American College Women in 1917, and the site of courses for the first dance major in the U.S. in 1926.

== History ==
When the UW was founded in 1848 there were no phy-ed classes. Studies focused on geography, English grammar, Latin and Greek, and a notion was still around that if a person exerted energy on physical activities, less energy would be available for intellectual tasks. Beyond that, "physical activity for a woman was thought to be especially hazardous because during menstruation she was 'periodically weakened.'"

Early college phy-ed programs in the U.S. were largely inspired by gymnastics clubs brought by German immigrants in the mid-1800s. Their thinking was that "strong bodies promoted well-balanced minds." Despite Wisconsin's many German immigrants, the UW offered no formal physical education until 1890 when it established a department of Physical Training for Men.

There were no women students in the first years of the UW, but in 1864, when many of the male students had left for the Civil War, they were admitted to keep the university financially afloat. A Department of Physical Training for Women was established in 1899, nine years after that for men. It was first located in the women's dormitory Ladies' Hall, where Chadbourne stands now.

With the Red Gym's opening in 1894, male students had a good phy-ed facility. Women asked to share it, but were refused. A gym wing was added to Ladies'/Chadbourne Hall in 1895, but it was soon inadequate. Already in 1902 University president Charles Van Hise outlined the problem: "Last year there were in the university five hundred thirty five young women.... There is an immediate need for a commodious and modern building, which will serve as a gymnasium and social center for the women of the University." By 1907 a plan was finalized for the new building, which was envisioned as the second in a quadrangle of women's buildings after Ladies'/Chadbourne Hall.

The building was designed mainly by Paul Philippe Cret, with input from Warren Laird and Arthur Peabody. Its footprint is a dumb-bell shape, with the center section four stories and each end-wing five stories. The exterior is clad in Madison sandstone blocks. The style is Neoclassical, dominated by large round-topped windows that span the third and fourth stories. At the top of the wall, modillion blocks accent a wood cornice which leads to a hip roof covered in red tile. "When Lathrop Hall was opened in 1910, it boasted four bowling alleys, a cafeteria, a laundry, a theater, a three-story gymnasium with running track, a swimming pool, dressing rooms equipped with lockers and showers, classrooms, and offices for the faculty and the Y.W.C.A.". The hall was named for John Hiram Lathrop, first chancellor of the UW.

During WWI the hall was used as a barracks for the Student Army Training Corps. In 1917 Blanche Trilling founded the national Athletic Conference of American College Women from the building. In the 1920s Margaret H'Doubler started the first college dance curriculum in the U.S., and the UW offered the first dance major in the country in 1926. Also in this building, Ruth Glassow did important work in the field of kinesiology.

Currently Lathrop Hall houses the university's dance program, including the Louise Kloepper Studio, named for the head of the dance program from 1963 to 1975.
