= Julie Steele =

Australian biomechanist

Julie Steele AM
- Awards: 2005 NSW Telstra Businesswoman of the Year, 2019 Member (AM) of the Order of Australia
- Scientific career
- Fields: Biomechanics, applied biomechanics
- Institutions: University of Wollongong

Julie Robyn Steele is a retired Australian professor of bio-mechanics who researched and taught basic, clinical, and applied biomechanics.

Steele spent most of her career at the University of Wollongong, where she joined in 1983 and retired in 2020. It was also where she founded the Biomechanics Research Laboratory and Breast Research Australia (BRA). In 2021, she was awarded with a Emeritus Professorship at the University.

== Biography ==
Steele was born in Adelaide, South Australia. After completing high school, She began a career path in high school teaching. After graduation, she found that there were no positions available and relocated to Perth, where she studied biomechanics under Professor Bruce Elliott.

After completing her honours degree Steele relocated to Wollongong in 1983.

== Research career ==
Steele's early research focused on the mechanics of lower limb injuries, which was used to design footwear to increase the quality of life in the elderly, obese, and those with injuries.

Her later work focused on creating wearable technologies for women suffering from lymphedema and designing the 'bionic bra' that tightens automatically when the wearer moves and relaxes when sitting or still.

Steele said of this focus:

This area of research has been largely ignored. It’s not because researchers are trying to be sexist, but rather, in male-dominated fields, they just haven’t thought about it.

— Julie Steele, 30 April 2021

She was the first Australian elected as President of the International Society of Biomechanics and one of only 44 biomechanists appointed to the World Council of Biomechanics.

== Awards ==
- In 2005, Steele was awarded the NSW Telstra Business Women of the Year.
- In 2019, she was appointed a Member of the Order of Australia for her work in biomechanics, higher education, and professional associations.
