= Brittany Coats =

American biomechanical engineer

Brittany Coats is an American biomechanical engineer whose research is centered on head injuries, especially in infants. She is a professor of mechanical engineering at the University of Utah, and the director of the Utah Head Trauma Lab.

== Education and career ==
Coats majored in mechanical engineering at the University of Utah, graduating in 2000. She completed a Ph.D. in bioengineering at the University of Pennsylvania in 2007, supervised by Susan Margulies, before returning to the University of Utah as a faculty member.

== Recognition ==
In 2021, Coats was elected as an ASME Fellow.
