= HMCS Gaspé (J94) =

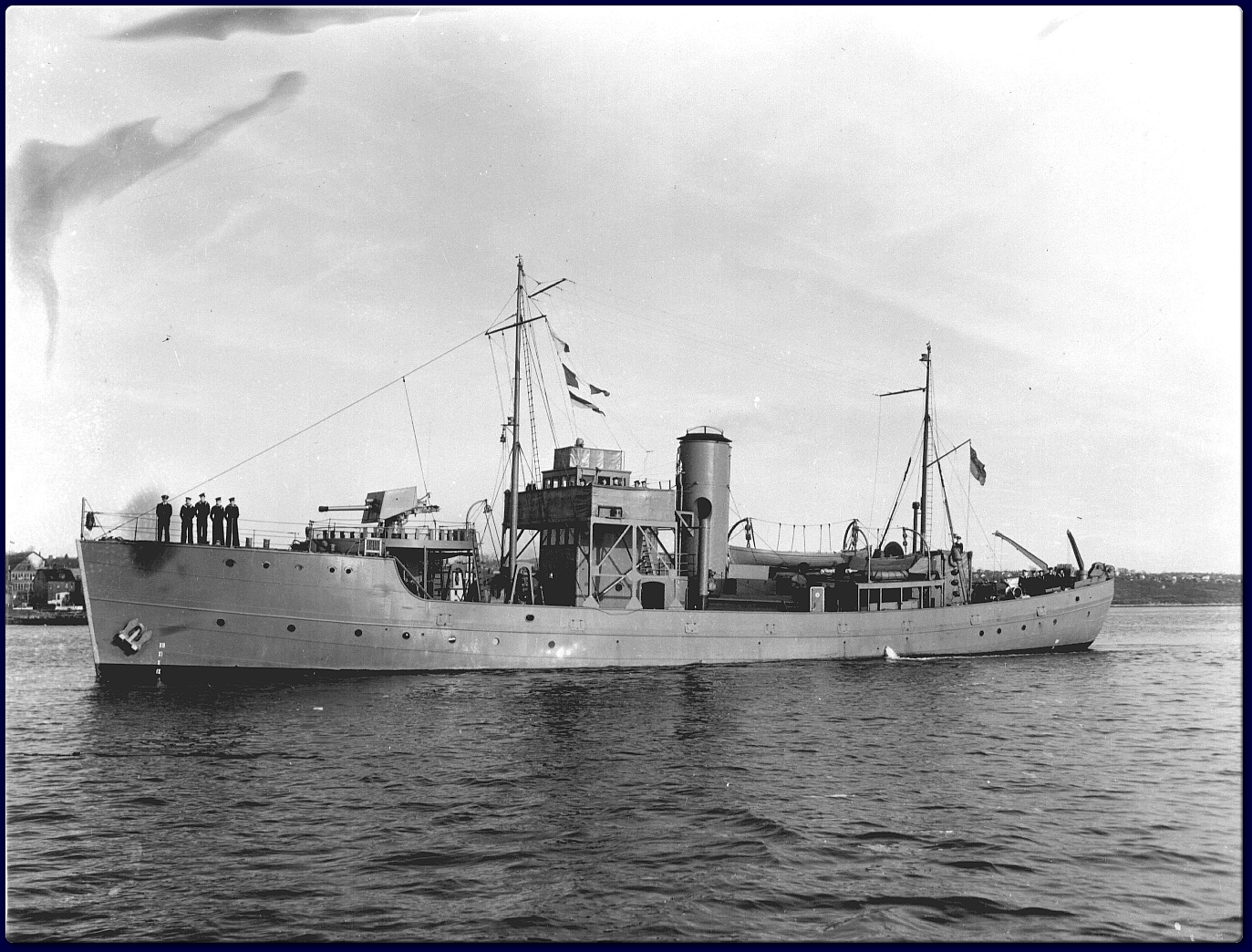
- Gaspé underway

History

Canada
- Name: Gaspé
- Namesake: Gaspé Bay
- Ordered: 23 August 1937
- Builder: Morton Engineering and Dry Dock Co. Quebec City
- Commissioned: 21 October 1938
- Decommissioned: 27 July 1945
- Identification: pennant number: J94
- Honours and awards: Atlantic 1939-45
- Fate: Sold for mercantile use 1946

General characteristics
- Class & type: Fundy-class minesweeper
- Displacement: 460 long tons (470 t; 520 short tons)
- Length: 163 ft (49.7 m)
- Beam: 27.5 ft (8.4 m)
- Draught: 14.5 ft (4.4 m)
- Speed: 12 knots (22.2 km/h)
- Complement: 38
- Armament: 1 × QF 4 in (102 mm) Mk IV gun

HMCS Gaspé was a Fundy-class minesweeper that served in the Royal Canadian Navy from 1938 to 1945. She saw service during the Second World War as part of the local defence of Halifax, Nova Scotia. She was named for Gaspé Bay in Quebec. Following the war the ship was sold for mercantile use, becoming the tugboat Sung Li. The ship's registry was deleted in 1993.

== Design and description ==
In 1936, new minesweepers were ordered for the Royal Canadian Navy. Based on the British Basset class, those built on the east coast would cost $318,000 per vessel. At the outbreak of the Second World War, the Royal Canadian Navy considered constructing more, but chose to build Bangor-class minesweepers instead upon learning of that design due to their oil-burning engines.

The Fundy class, named after the lead ship, displaced 460 long tons (470 t; 520 short tons). They were 163 ft (49.7 m) long, with a beam of 27.5 ft (8.4 m) and a draught of 14.5 ft (4.4 m). They had a complement of 3 officers and 35 ratings.

The Fundy class was propelled by one shaft driven by vertical triple expansion engine powered by steam from a one-cylinder boiler. This created between 850–950 indicated horsepower (630–710 kW) and gave the minesweepers a top speed of 12 knots (22 km/h; 14 mph). The ships were capable of carrying between 180–196 long tons (183–199 t) of coal.

The ships were armed with one QF 4-inch (102 mm) Mk IV gun mounted forward on a raised platform. (Note: Macpherson and Barrie state that the ships were equipped with one QF 12-pounder 12 cwt naval gun.) (Note: Mark IV = Mark 4. Britain used Roman numerals to denote Marks (models) of ordnance until after World War II.) The minesweepers were armed with two 20 mm Oerlikon anti-aircraft cannon. They were later equipped with 25 depth charges.

== Service history ==
Gaspé was ordered on 23 August 1937 for the Royal Canadian Navy. The vessel's keel was laid down on 24 January 1938 by Morton Engineering and Dry Dock Co. at Quebec City. The ship was launched on 12 August later that year. Gaspé was commissioned into the Royal Canadian Navy on 21 October 1938 at Quebec City.

After commissioning, Gaspé was one of two of the Fundy-class minesweepers assigned to the east coast of Canada. She was stationed at Halifax, Nova Scotia when the war broke out. At the onset of war, Gaspé and sister ship Fundy were the only warships available to patrol the entrance to Halifax's harbour. She served with the Halifax Local Defence Force as a local minesweeper. On 14 January 1945, she picked up 56 survivors of the British tanker British Freedom that was torpedoed and sunk east of Halifax by the German submarine U-1232. The ship was paid off on 23 July 1945 at Halifax.

Gaspé was sold into mercantile service in 1946. The ship re-emerged as the tugboat Sung Li, working out of Shanghai. The ship's registry was deleted in 1993.
