= David A. Winter =

David Arthur Winter
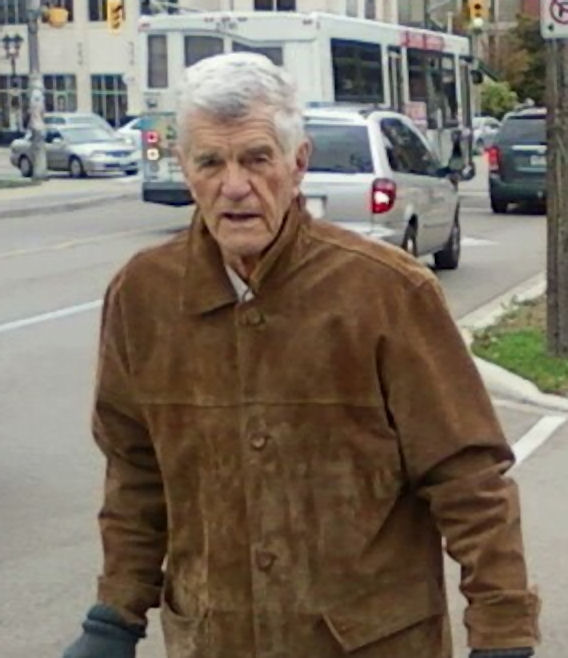
- Born: June 16, 1930; Windsor, Ontario, Canada
- Died: February 6, 2012 (aged 81); Guelph, Ontario
- Education: Queen's University at Kingston
- Known for: Biomechanics, Electromyography, Gait Analysis
- Scientific career
- Fields: Kinesiology, Biomechanics
- Workplaces: University of Waterloo, University of Manitoba, Technical University of Nova Scotia, Royal Military College of Canada

David A. Winter (PhD, PEng) was a distinguished professor emeritus at the University of Waterloo. He played a pivotal role in defining the modern field of biomechanics, through his conceptual framework for analyzing human movement. He was also a founding member of the Canadian Society for Biomechanics and its first Career Award winner. He was later awarded the Muybridge Medal of the International Society of Biomechanics (ISB) and the Lifetime Achievement Award of The Gait and Clinical Movement Analysis Society. Before becoming an academic, he served as an electrical officer with the Royal Canadian Navy on HMCS Nootka from 1952 to 1958. He completed his service at the rank of lieutenant commander. In December 2011, ISB named an award to encourage young people to stay involved in biomechanics research the "David Winter Young Investigator Award."

Winter is notable for introducing many important methods and concepts to the study of human locomotion and balance, such as automated television motion capture, lowpass digital filtering of marker trajectories, measurement of instantaneous segmental energy, and the powers produced by joint moments of force, and the analysis of electromyograms by ensemble averaging.

== Education ==
- BSc, Electrical Engineering, Queen's University, 1953
- MSc, Electrical Engineering, Queen's University, 1961
- PhD, Physiology & Biophysics, Dalhousie University, 1967

== Academic posts ==
Winter started his academic career in 1961 as an assistant professor in electrical engineering at the Royal Military College in Kingston, Ontario. He then took up a similar position at the Technical University of Nova Scotia, where he was eventually promoted to professor in 1969. In 1969, he became director of biomedical engineering at the Shriner's Hospital in Winnipeg with an associate professorship in surgery at the University of Manitoba and an adjunct professorship in electrical engineering. He was then hired as an associate professor in the Department of Kinesiology at the University of Waterloo in 1974. He was promoted to professor in 1976, and when he retired in 1995, he was given the title of distinguished professor emeritus.

== Textbooks ==
- David A. Winter. (2009). Biomechanics and Motor Control of Human Movement, Fourth Edition. Published by John Wiley & Sons, New York. ISBN 978-0-470-39818-0.
- David A. Winter and Aftab E. Patla. (1997). Signal Processing and Linear Systems for the Movement Sciences. Published by Waterloo Biomechanics.
- David A. Winter. (1995). A.B.C. (Anatomy, Biomechanics and Control) of Balance during Standing and Walking. David A. Winter. Published by Waterloo Biomechanics.
- David A. Winter. (1991). The Biomechanics and Motor Control of Human Gait: Normal, Elderly and Pathological, Second Edition. David A. Winter. Published by Waterloo Biomechanics.

== Awards and honours ==
- 1990, Career Investigators Award, Canadian Society for Biomechanics
- 1995, Wartenweiler Memorial Lecture, 15th Congress International Society of Biomechanics
- 1996, Geoffrey Dyson Lecturer, International Society of Biomechanics in Sports, Madeira, June 25
- 2001, Lifetime Achievement Award, The Gait and Clinical Movement Analysis Society
- 2001, Muybridge Medal, The International Society of Biomechanics

=== Additional awards ===
- 1966–1968, Canada Council Fellow in Engineering, Medicine & Science
- 1970–1974, President, Canadian Medical and Biological Engineering Society
- 1973, Listed in American Men and Women of Science
- 1997, Fellow of Institute of Electrical & Electronic Engineers
- 2002, Fellow of Canadian Society for Biomechanics

== Personal life ==
Winter was born in Windsor, Ontario, and moved soon thereafter to Hamilton. He was one of five boys growing up in Hamilton with his dad (Reginald Winter) and mom (Mary Winter, née Moore). After graduating from Westdale Secondary School and completing his BSc at RMC, he joined the Navy and moved to Halifax. Here he met his wife, Judith (Judy) Winter (née Wilson), and the two were married on July 26, 1958. Winter had three children: Merriam, Andrew, and Bruce Winter. Winter has 5 grandchildren (Adam, Samuel, and Joshua Fraser (mother Merriam), and Sarah and Olivia Winter (father Bruce)).
