= Gerda Strutzenberger =

Biomechanics scientist

- Born: 1982 (age 42–43); Kirchdorf an der Krems, Upper Austria
- Awards: Hans-Gros New Investigator Award (2012) DGfB Award, Germany (2013) New Investigator Award, VSOU, Germany (2011) New Investigator Award, ÖSG, Austria (2010)
- Scientific career
- Fields: Clinical biomechanics, sport biomechanics, gait, lower limb amputation, ACL injury
- Institutions: University of Salzburg

Gerda Strutzenberger (born 1982) is an Austrian senior scientist in biomechanics.

== Biography ==
Strutzenberger was born in 1982 in Kirchdorf an der Krems, Upper Austria, and earned her Ph.D. in 2011 from the Karlsruhe Institute of Technology (KIT) in Germany. She is currently a senior scientist at the University of Salzburg, Austria. During her career, she has developed expertise in clinical and sports performance biomechanics, contributing significantly to understanding human movement. Between 2013 and 2014, she undertook a sabbatical at Cardiff Metropolitan University, UK, to work on a FIFA-funded research project.

Beyond research, Strutzenberger teaches sport science, physiotherapy, and medical students, demonstrating commitment to education and mentorship. She has also played an active role in international organisations, including the International Society of Biomechanics in Sports (ISBS), where she currently serves as Vice President of Project and Research.

== Research career ==
Strutzenberger’s research is focused on two primary areas:

- Clinical biomechanics: This includes studying ACL injuries, obesity-related gait challenges, and movement in amputees.
- Sports performance biomechanics: She examines athletic movements in sports such as cycling, sprinting, running, rugby, and football. Her work has involved elite athletes and collaborations with global organisations, including FIFA and the International Rugby Board (IRB).

Her research philosophy emphasises applying biomechanics knowledge to improve health outcomes and enhance athletic performance. She has shared her findings extensively through peer-reviewed publications, international conferences, and invited presentations. Notably, she was an invited speaker at the International Society of Biomechanics in Sports (ISBS) conference in 2013.

In addition to her research, Strutzenberger has made significant contributions to supporting emerging scientists. She established the ISBS Student Mentor Programme, which provides mentorship to early-career researchers and strengthens the conference experience for students.

== Awards ==
Strutzenberger's contributions to biomechanics have been widely recognised with numerous national and international awards:

- Hans Gros New Investigator Award (2012)
- DGfB Award, Germany (2013)
- New Investigator Award, VSOU, Germany (2011)
- New Investigator Award, ÖSG, Austria (2010).
