= Alexandra Atack =

British academic in biomechanics

Alexandra Atack is a British academic in biomechanics, whose work has focused on sports techniques, most particularly kicking and striking skills. She is an associate professor in Sport Biomechanics at St Mary’s University, Twickenham.

== Education ==
Atack received a Bachelor of Science (Honours) in Sports and Exercise Science from the University of Bath in 2010. She earned a Doctor of Philosophy from the University of Surrey in 2016 with a dissertation entitled "The Biomechanics of Rugby Place Kicking".

== Career ==
Atack is the Research Lead for the School of Sport, Exercise, and Applied Science at St Mary's University. She previously served at the same university as the Applied Sport and Exercise Biomechanics MSc Course Lead and the Program Director for both the BSc Sport Science and MSc Aplied SPort and Exercise biomechanics programmes.

=== Research contributions ===
Atack's research uses 3D motion capture technology to analyse sports movements, with a particular focus on kicking and striking skills. Her work includes studying the biomechanics of rugby place kicking, jump landings in ballet, and injuries in netball.

=== Leadership and service ===
Atack served on the Board of Directors of the International Society of Biomechanics in Sports (ISBS) from 2020 to 2022. In this role she was involved with the evaluation of the ISBS's women's mentor circles, finding that the initiative was worthwhile and had a positive impact for women members of the society.

=== Professional sports ===
Leveraging her research background, Atack has worked in biomechanical support roles for both the Rugby Football Union in England and the Harlequins Academy.

=== Honours and awards ===
In 2022 the ISBS named her a Fellow of the ISBS, an award which recognises "substantial scholarly and service contributions to ISBS and Sports Biomechanics."
