= Australian and New Zealand Society of Biomechanics =

Not-for-profit organisation

- Formation: February 1996
- Website: https://www.anzsb.asn.au/

Australian and New Zealand Society of Biomechanics (ANZSB) is an affiliate society of the International Society of Biomechanics and it was founded in February 1996 to be a forum for biomechanists, of all disciplines, within Australia and New Zealand.

== About ==
The main objectives of the society are to:

- Facilitate communication
- Provide a forum
- Promote the dissemination and application of information

Membership of the society is open to all people that have a professional and/or scientific interest in biomechanics; including students.

== Regular events ==
- Every two years the society hosts the Australasian Biomechanics Conference (ABC).
- Annually they promote National Biomechanics Day (5 April), which started in the United States, in the region.
- In Australia they host a nationwide Biomechanics and Research Innovation Challenge which engages high school aged girls with early to mid-career female biomechanists to complete a 100-day research and/or innovation project. The project is led by Celeste Coltman from the University of Canberra.
