= HMCS Comox (J64) =

Fundy-class minesweeper

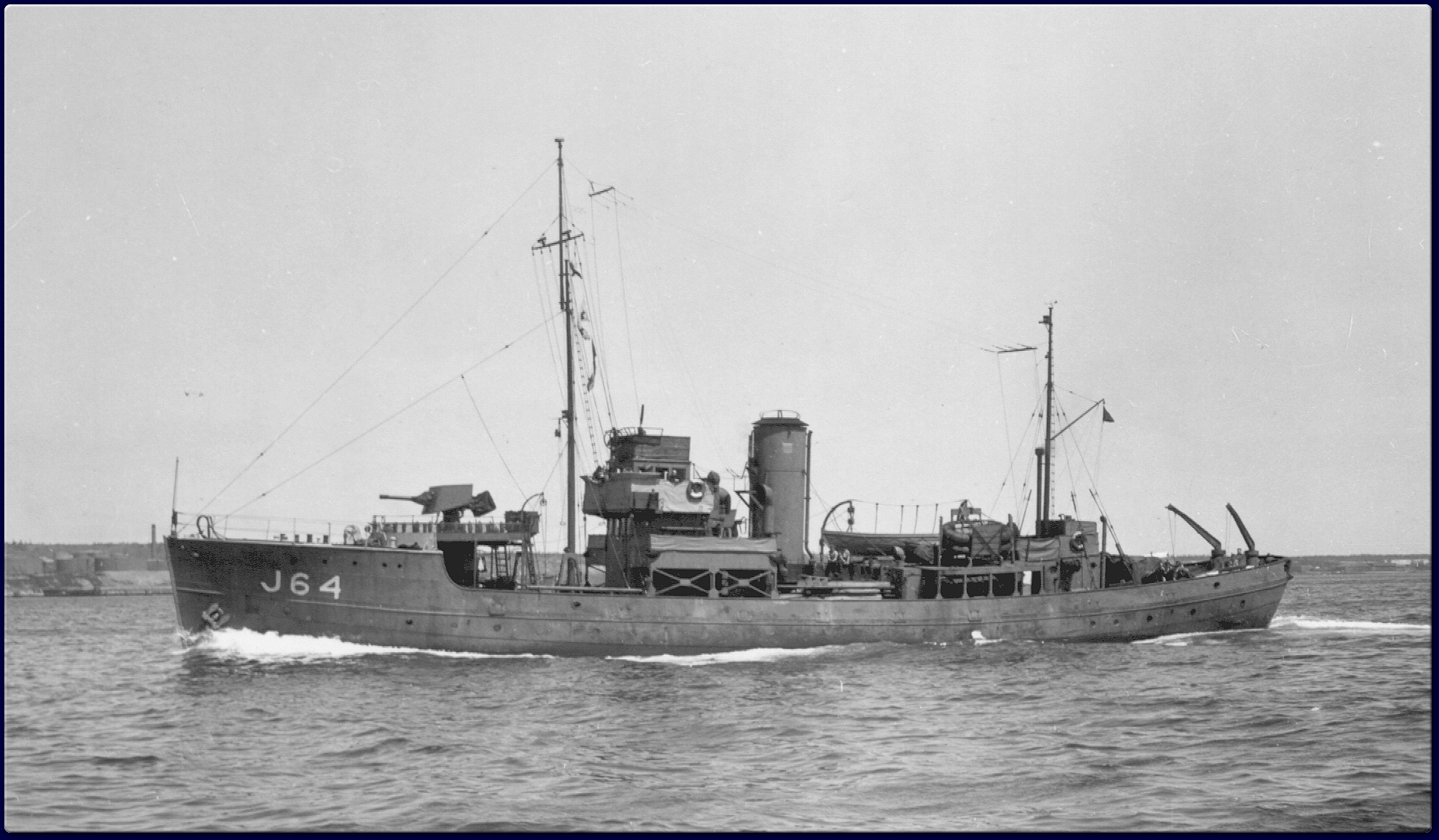
- Comox underway

History

Canada
- Name: Comox
- Namesake: Comox Harbour
- Ordered: 23 August 1937
- Builder: Burrard Dry Dock Co. Ltd., North Vancouver
- Yard number: 117
- Laid down: 5 February 1938
- Launched: 9 August 1938
- Commissioned: 23 November 1938
- Decommissioned: 27 July 1945
- Identification: Pennant number: J64
- Honours and awards: Atlantic 1940-45
- Fate: Sold for mercantile service 1946.
- Renamed: Sung Ming
- Owner: Ming Sung Industrial Co Ltd
- Acquired: 1946
- Identification: IMO number: 5344841
- Fate: Deleted 1993

General characteristics
- Class & type: Fundy-class minesweeper
- Displacement: 460 long tons (470 t; 520 short tons)
- Length: 163 ft (49.7 m)
- Beam: 27.5 ft (8.4 m)
- Draught: 14.5 ft (4.4 m)
- Speed: 12 knots (22.2 km/h)
- Complement: 38
- Armament: 1 × QF 4 in (102 mm) Mk IV gun

HMCS Comox was a Fundy-class minesweeper that served in the Royal Canadian Navy from 1938–1945. She served during the Second World War as a local patrol craft for Esquimalt, British Columbia before transferring to Halifax, Nova Scotia performing general minesweeping duties. After the war she sold for mercantile service and converted to a tugboat named Sung Ming. The ship's registry was deleted in 1993.

== Design and description ==
In 1936, new minesweepers were ordered for the Royal Canadian Navy. Based on the British Basset class, those built on the west coast would cost $403,000 per vessel. At the outbreak of the Second World War, the Royal Canadian Navy considered constructing more, but chose to build Bangor-class minesweepers instead upon learning of that design due to their oil-burning engines.

The Fundy class, named after the lead ship, displaced 460 long tons (470 t; 520 short tons). They were 163 ft (49.7 m) long, with a beam of 27.5 ft (8.4 m) and a draught of 14.5 ft (4.4 m). They had a complement of 3 officers and 35 ratings.

The Fundy class was propelled by one shaft driven by vertical triple expansion engine powered by steam from a one-cylinder boiler. This created between 850–950 indicated horsepower (630–710 kW) and gave the minesweepers a top speed of 12 knots (22 km/h; 14 mph). The ships were capable of carrying between 180–196 long tons (183–199 t) of coal.

The ships were armed with one QF 4-inch (102 mm) Mk IV gun mounted forward on a raised platform. (Note: Macpherson and Barrie state that the ships were equipped with one QF 12-pounder 12 cwt naval gun.) (Note: Mark IV = Mark 4. Britain used Roman numerals to denote Marks (models) of ordnance until after World War II.) The minesweepers were armed with two 20 mm Oerlikon anti-aircraft cannons. They were later equipped with 25 depth charges.

== Service history ==
Comox was ordered on 23 August 1937. The ship was laid down on 5 February 1938 by Burrard Dry Dock Co. Ltd. at Vancouver, British Columbia with the yard number 117 and launched on 9 August later that year. She was commissioned into the Royal Canadian Navy on 23 November 1938.

Comox was initially assigned to the west coast. At the onset of the Second World War, she remained at Esquimalt carrying out local patrol duties. In March 1940, she and her sister ship Nootka were reassigned to the east coast. Arriving in April 1940 Comox spent the rest of the war performing minesweeping duties for Halifax Harbour. Along with her sister ship, Fundy, she rescued survivors of the torpedoed Liberty ship SS Martin Van Buren on 15 January 1945.

Comox was paid off on 27 July 1945. The vessel was sold in 1946 for commercial service to Ming Sung Industrial Co Ltd and converted to the tugboat Sung Ming. The ship was deleted in 1993.
