= Bruce Mason (sports scientist) =

Australian sports scientist

Bruce Robert Mason (born 1945) is an Australian sports scientist in the field of biomechanics. Between 1982 and 2014, he made a significant contribution to the Australian Institute of Sport (AIS) in the area of biomechanics, particularly in the sport of swimming.

== Academic career ==
He was a graduate in mathematics from University of Sydney. In 1980, he graduated from the University of Oregon with a PhD in biomechanics. His thesis was titled A kinematic and kinetic analysis of selected parameters during the support phase of running. From 1980 to 1982, Mason was a Lecturer at the University of Wollongong.

== Australian Institute of Sport ==
Mason was appointed the inaugural Head of Australian Institute of Sport (AIS) Biomechanics department in 1982. In 1982, he was joined at the AIS by Dr Dick Telford, Co-ordinator of Sport Science, Dr Peter Fricker, Sports Physician, Craig Purdam, Physiotherapist and Jeff Bond, Sport Psychologist. In the early days of the AIS, Mason described his role a jack of all trades in biomechanics. He assisted golfers refine their swing and track and field athletes with their technique. As the AIS developed, he focussed on swimming. Mason and his team developed wet-plate analysis, which offers real-time assessment of athletes in the pool. Prior to the 2008 Beijing Olympics, Mason worked with swimwear maker Speedo's to develop its "Beijing suit", a superfast polyurethane-coated bodysuit. The swim suit became known as LZR Racer. In July 2009, FINA changed its rules to ban all body-length swimsuits due to the large number of world records being broken by the new high tech swimsuits.

In 2006, Mason became Head of the AIS's Aquatic Testing, Training and Research Unit, a position that he held until his retirement in September 2014. During this period, Mason was responsible for designing $17million the AIS Aquatics Centre, which opened in 2007. The pool has a range of high-tech performance analysis devices and biomechanical systems including instrumented start blocks and turn walls, timing gates, filming trolleys and strategically placed cameras.

Mason has worked with leading AIS swimmers including Olympic gold medallists Petria Thomas, Michael Klim and Alicia Coutts. From the early 1990s to 2004, Mason worked with the Australian Swim Team including Olympic gold medallists Ian Thorpe, Kieren Perkins, Grant Hackett, Susie O'Neill and Jess Schipper.

== Recognition ==
- 1998 and 1999 – Outstanding Contribution to Swimming in Australia by Australian Swim Coaches and Teachers Association.
- 2000 – Geoffrey Dyson Award of the International Society of Biomechanics in Sports
- 2000 – Australian Sports Medal for services to sports science and medicine
- 2002 – Order of Australia (OAM) for service to sport, particularly through the application of biomechanics to swimming.
