= HMCS Fundy (J88) =

1938 Fundy-class minesweeper

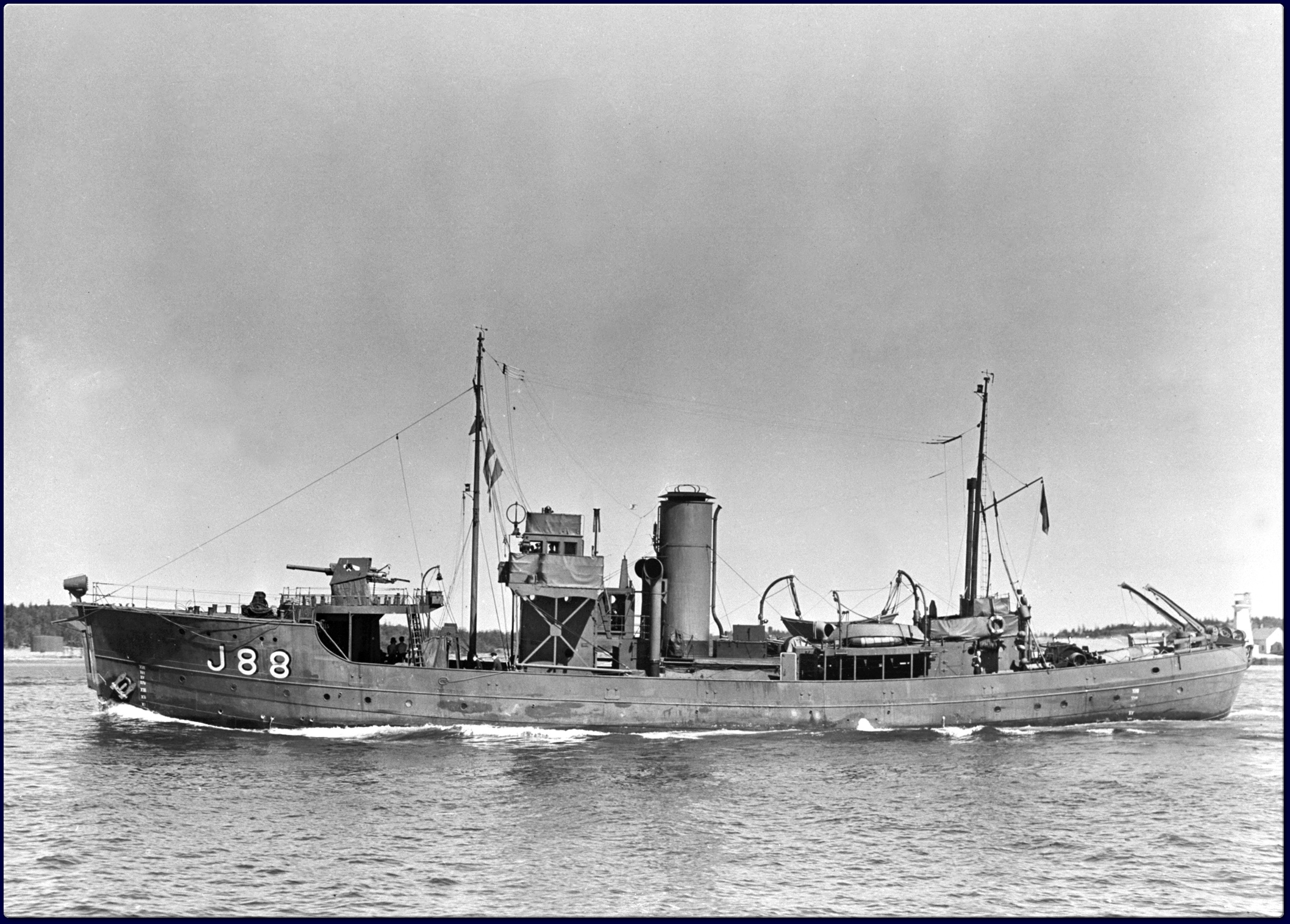
- Fundy underway

History

Canada
- Name: Fundy
- Namesake: Bay of Fundy
- Ordered: 23 August 1937
- Builder: Collingwood Shipyards Ltd., Collingwood, Ontario
- Laid down: 24 January 1938
- Launched: 18 June 1938
- Commissioned: 1 September 1938
- Decommissioned: 27 July 1945
- Identification: pennant number: J88; IMO number: 6808167
- Honours and awards: Atlantic 1939–45
- Fate: Sold to Marine Industries Ltd 1947, scrapped 1987

General characteristics
- Class & type: Fundy-class minesweeper
- Displacement: 460 long tons (470 t)
- Length: 163 ft (49.7 m)
- Beam: 27.5 ft (8.4 m)
- Draught: 14.5 ft (4.4 m)
- Speed: 12 knots (22 km/h; 14 mph)
- Complement: 38
- Armament: 1 × QF 4 in (102 mm) Mk IV gun

HMCS Fundy was a Fundy-class minesweeper that served in the Royal Canadian Navy from 1938 to 1945. The minesweeper was the first warship built for Canada since 1918. She saw service in the Atlantic Ocean during the Second World War. The vessel was named for the Bay of Fundy. After the war she had an extensive civilian career.

== Design and description ==
In 1936, new minesweepers were ordered for the Royal Canadian Navy. Based on the British Basset class, those built on the east coast would cost $318,000 per vessel. At the outbreak of the Second World War, the Royal Canadian Navy considered constructing more, but chose to build Bangor-class minesweepers instead upon learning of that design due to their oil-burning engines.

The Fundy class, named after the lead ship, displaced 460 long tons (470 t). They were 163 ft (49.7 m) long, with a beam of 27.5 ft (8.4 m) and a draught of 14.5 ft (4.4 m). They had a complement of 3 officers and 35 ratings.

The Fundy class was propelled by one shaft driven by vertical triple expansion engine powered by steam from a one-cylinder boiler. This created between 850–950 indicated horsepower (630–710 kW) and gave the minesweepers a top speed of 12 knots (22 km/h; 14 mph). The ships were capable of carrying between 180–196 long tons (183–199 t) of coal.

The ships were armed with one QF 4-inch (102 mm) Mk IV gun mounted forward on a raised platform. (Note: Macpherson and Barrie state that the ships were equipped with one QF 12-pounder 12 cwt naval gun.) (Note: Mark IV = Mark 4. Britain used Roman numerals to denote Marks (models) of ordnance until after World War II.) The minesweepers were armed with two 20 mm Oerlikon anti-aircraft cannon. They were later equipped with 25 depth charges.

== Service history ==
Fundy was ordered on 23 August 1937 as the lead ship of her class of four minesweepers built in Canada. The ship's keel was laid down on 24 January 1938 by Collingwood Shipyards Ltd. at Collingwood, Ontario. The warship was launched on 18 June later that year. Fundy was commissioned into the Royal Canadian Navy on 1 September 1938 at Collingwood.

After commissioning, Fundy was one of two of the Fundy-class minesweepers assigned to the East Coast of Canada. She was stationed at Halifax, Nova Scotia when the war broke out. At the onset of war, Fundy and sister ship Gaspe were the only warships available to patrol the entrance to Halifax's harbour. Fundy saw continuous service in the Second World War as a minesweeper and harbour defence vessel for Halifax Harbour. In July 1942 she escorted a convoy to Boston and one back to Halifax. Along with her sister ship HMCS Comox, Fundy rescued 66 survivors of the torpedoed Liberty ship SS Martin Van Buren on 15 January 1945. Fundy was decommissioned on 27 July 1945 and laid up.

=== Commercial service ===
Fundy was sold in 1947 to Marine Industries Limited and converted for mercantile service with a gross register tonnage of 419 tons. The ship was refitted with a diesel engine giving the vessel a maximum speed of 12 knots (22 km/h; 14 mph). The ship was initially renamed Aigle Marin in 1967, owned by Les Chargeurs Unis Inc. The merchant vessel was sold to Niquelay Incorporated and renamed Anne R.D. in 1977. The vessel was broken up at La Malbaie, Quebec in July 1987. Her bell is preserved at the Maritime Museum of the Atlantic in Halifax.
