= Canadian Society for Biomechanics =

Canadian Society for Biomechanics / Société canadienne de biomécanique (CSB/SCB) was formed in 1973. The CSB is an Affiliated Society with the International Society of Biomechanics (ISB).

The purpose of the Society is to foster research and the interchange of information on the biomechanics of human physical activity.

Biomechanics research is being performed more and more by people from diverse disciplinary and professional backgrounds. CSB/SCB is attempting to enhance interdisciplinary communication and thereby improve the quality of biomechanics research and facilitate application of findings by bringing together therapists, physicians, engineers, sport researchers, ergonomists, and others who are using the same pool of basic biomechanics techniques but studying different human movement problems.
