= HMCS Nootka (J35) =

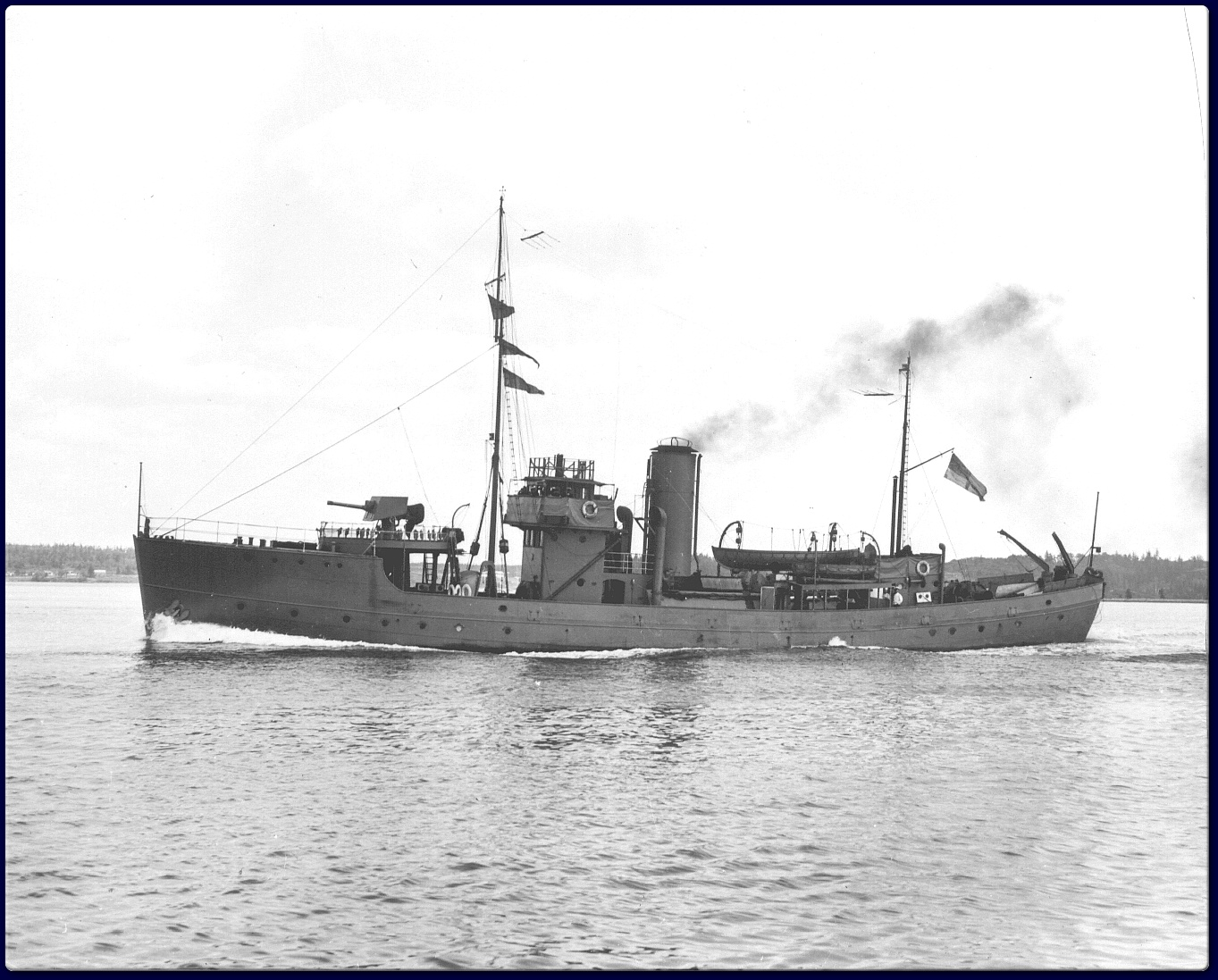
- Nootka underway

History

Canada
- Name: Nootka
- Namesake: Nootka Sound
- Ordered: 23 August 1937
- Builder: Yarrows Ltd., Esquimalt
- Laid down: 1 February 1938
- Launched: 26 September 1938
- Commissioned: 6 December 1938
- Decommissioned: 29 July 1945
- Renamed: Nanoose 1943
- Identification: Pennant number: J35
- Fate: Sold for commercial service 1946.

General characteristics
- Class & type: Fundy-class minesweeper
- Displacement: 460 long tons (470 t; 520 short tons)
- Length: 163 ft (49.7 m)
- Beam: 27.5 ft (8.4 m)
- Draught: 14.5 ft (4.4 m)
- Speed: 12 knots (22.2 km/h)
- Complement: 38
- Armament: 1 × QF 4 in (102 mm) Mk IV gun

HMCS Nootka was a Fundy-class minesweeper that served in the Royal Canadian Navy from 1938–1945. She saw service during the Second World War as a local minesweeper working out of Halifax, Nova Scotia. She was named for Nootka Sound. In 1943 she was renamed HMCS Nanoose to allow the unit name Nootka to be used by the destroyer HMCS Nootka. Following the war the ship was sold for mercantile use, becoming the tugboat Sung Ling. The ship's registry was deleted in 1993.

== Design and description ==
In 1936, new minesweepers were ordered for the Royal Canadian Navy. Based on the British Basset class, those built on the West Coast of Canada would cost $403,000 per vessel. At the outbreak of the Second World War, the Royal Canadian Navy considered constructing more, but chose to build Bangor-class minesweepers instead upon learning of that design due to their oil-burning engines.

The Fundy class, named after the lead ship, displaced 460 long tons (470 t; 520 short tons). They were 163 ft (49.7 m) long, with a beam of 27.5 ft (8.4 m) and a draught of 14.5 ft (4.4 m). They had a complement of 3 officers and 35 ratings.

The Fundy class was propelled by one shaft driven by vertical triple expansion engine powered by steam from a one-cylinder boiler. This created between 850–950 indicated horsepower (630–710 kW) and gave the minesweepers a top speed of 12 knots (22 km/h; 14 mph). The ships were capable of carrying between 180–196 long tons (183–199 t) of coal.

The ships were armed with one QF 4-inch (102 mm) Mk IV gun mounted forward on a raised platform. (Note: Macpherson and Barrie state that the ships were equipped with one QF 12-pounder 12 cwt naval gun.) (Note: Mark IV = Mark 4. Britain used Roman numerals to denote Marks (models) of ordnance until after World War II.) The minesweepers were armed with two 20 mm Oerlikon anti-aircraft cannon. They were later equipped with 25 depth charges.

== Construction and career ==
Nootka was ordered on 23 August 1937. The ship's keel was laid down on 1 February 1938 by Yarrows Ltd. at Esquimalt, British Columbia and the vessel was launched on 26 September later that year. The minesweeper was commissioned into the Royal Canadian Navy on 6 December 1938 at Esquimalt.

After commissioning, Nootka was assigned to Esquimalt. When the Second World War commenced, she remained a part of the Esquimalt force, performing local patrol duties. In March 1940, she and her sister, Comox, transferred to the East Coast, joining the Halifax Local Defence Force upon arrival. Nootka performed local patrol and minesweeping duties in and around Halifax harbour. The minesweeper spent the rest of the war in this service.

On 1 April 1943, Nootka gave up her name so it could be used by a newly constructed Tribal-class destroyer. The ship was renamed Nanoose but kept her pennant number. Nanoose was paid off on 29 July 1945 at Halifax and laid up. In 1946 the minesweeper was sold to Chinese interests and converted for commercial use. She reappeared as the tugboat Sung Ling. The ship's registry was deleted in 1993.
