= Susan Margulies =

American engineer

- Education: Princeton University; University of Pennsylvania
- Scientific career
- Workplaces: Vanderbilt University National Science Foundation; Emory University; Georgia Institute of Technology; University of Pennsylvania Mayo Clinic
- Thesis: Biomechanics of traumatic coma in the primate (1987)
- Doctoral students: Brittany Coats

Susan S. Margulies is an American biomedical engineer who is the Vice Provost for Research and Innovation at Vanderbilt University. She previously served as the assistant director of the U.S. National Science Foundation Directorate for Engineering from 2021-2025, and as the chair of the Wallace H. Coulter Department of Biomedical Engineering at Georgia Institute of Technology and Emory University, where she served as chair from 2017 to 2021. She is a world leader in the biomechanics of head injury in children.

== Early life and education ==
Margulies grew up in Rochester, Minnesota. She completed her Bachelor's at Princeton University, where she majored in mechanical and aerospace engineering. She graduated summa cum laude in 1982. She earned her Master's and PhD at University of Pennsylvania in 1987. Her dissertation, Biomechanics of traumatic coma in the primate, considered diffuse axonal injury.

== Research ==
After completing her PhD, Margulies joined the Mayo Clinic as a postdoctoral associate in Thoracic Diseases Research, and was promoted to Assistant Professor in Biophysics and Physiology. In 1993 she was appointed as Assistant Professor to the Bioengineering Department at the University of Pennsylvania, tenured in 1998, and was promoted to Professor to the Biomedical engineering department at the University of Pennsylvania in Professor in 2004.

In 2017 she was as appointed as the Chair of the Wallace H. Coulter Department of Biomedical Engineering and became the first faculty member tenured in both the Georgia Institute of Technology and Emory University, where she served as department chair in both the College of Engineering at Georgia Institute of Technology and Emory University’s School of Medicine. During her term as Chair, research activity tripled, faculty size increased, space expanded, fundraising increased to record levels, and national rankings rose to #1 in the nation.

During Margulies’ tenure at the U.S. National Science Foundation, the Engineering Directorate provided over 40 percent of federal funding for fundamental research in engineering at academic institutions, leading to innovative nano to macro technologies and sustainable impacts in health, agriculture, clean energy and water, resilient infrastructure, advanced manufacturing, semiconductors, quantum systems, and many other areas. Margulies led the launch of new funding mechanisms to support high risk, high reward projects that expand engineering frontiers. To catalyze strategic priority areas at scale and speed, Margulies launched dozens of partnerships with federal agencies in the US and abroad, and with industry and philanthropic organizations.

In February 2026, Vanderbilt University announced that Margulies would join the university as its new Vice Provost for Research and Innovation, as well as a professor of biomedical engineering in the Vanderbilt School of Engineering, with her appointment beginning June 1, 2026.

As a scholar, Margulies is internationally recognized for pioneering studies to identify mechanisms underlying brain injuries in children and adolescents and lung injuries associated with mechanical ventilation, leading to improved injury prevention, diagnosis and treatments. She has launched numerous training and mentorship programs for students and faculty, created institute-wide initiatives to broaden participation, and led innovative projects in engineering education. With over $35 million in research funding, over 350 peer-reviewed scientific articles and 11 book chapters.[15][16] and 50 graduate and post-doctoral trainees, Margulies’ transdisciplinary scholarly impact has been recognized by her election to the National Academy of Engineering, National Academy of Medicine, American Academy of Arts and Sciences, Association for the Advancement of Science, and the National Academy of Inventors. In her disciplines she is a Fellow of the American Society of Mechanical Engineers, the Biomedical Engineering Society, and the American Institute for Medical and Biological Engineering.

== Honours and awards ==
- 1992 Whitaker Foundation Young Investigator
- 1997 NSF CAREER Award
- 1996 S. Reid Warren Award for Distinguished Teaching
- 2009 Ford Motor Company Award for Faculty Advising
- 2007 American Society of Mechanical Engineering Award
- 2007 Association of Women in Science Elizabeth Bingham Award for the Advancement of Women in Science
- 2006 American Institute for Medical and Biological Engineering, Fellow
- 2009 American Society of Mechanical Engineers, Fellow
- 2009 Biomedical Engineering Society, Fellow
- 2015 Distinguished Lecturer, Sackler Institute for Advanced Studies
- 2020 National Academy of Engineering, Member
- 2020 National Academy of Medicine, Member
- 2023 Elected to the American Academy of Arts and Sciences
- 2023 Elected to the National Academy of Inventors
- 2024 Elected to the Association for the Advancement of Science
- 2026 American Society of Mechanical Engineers Foundation establishes Susan S. Margulies Excellence in Leadership in Bioengineering Medal
