= Fundy-class minesweeper =

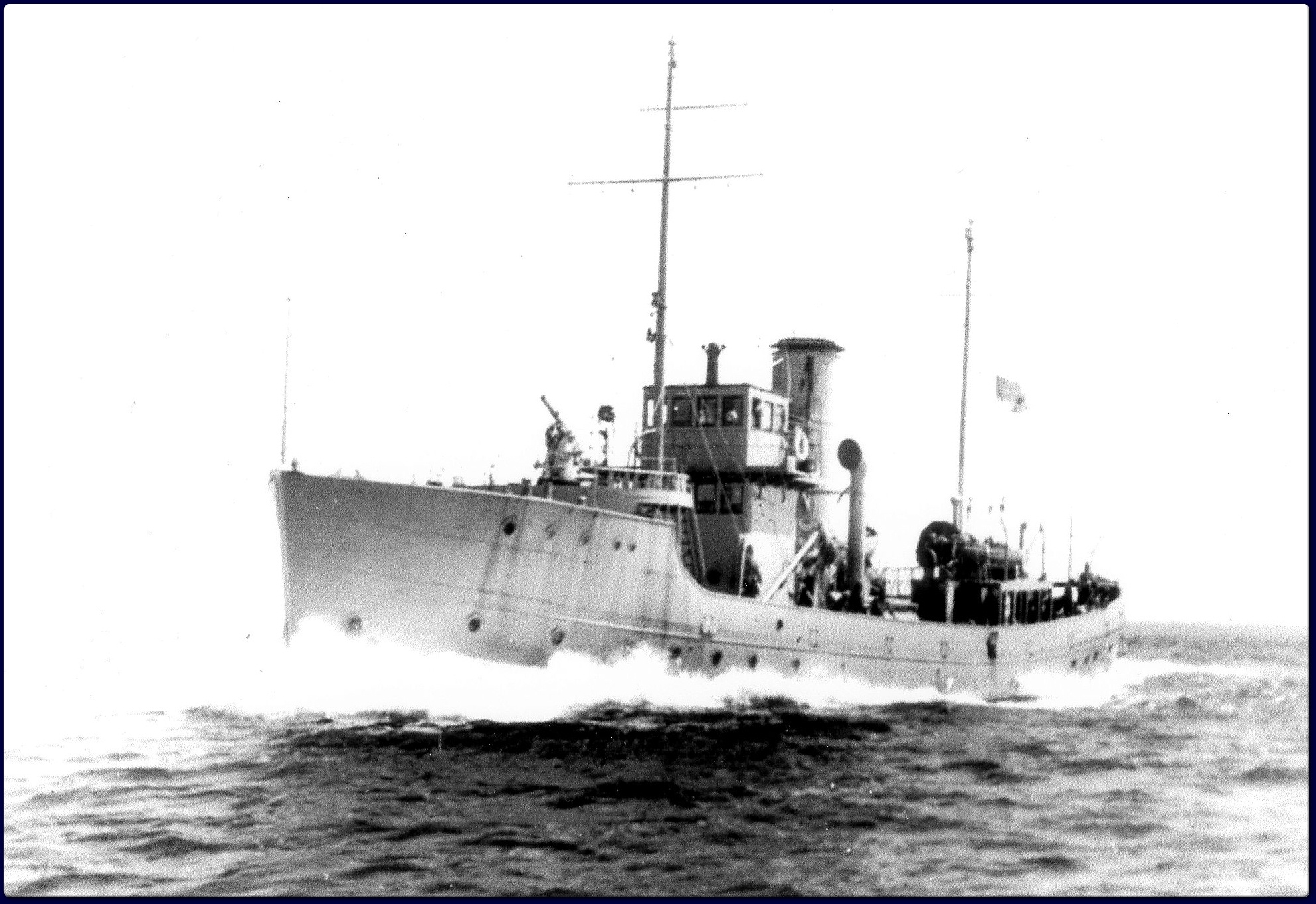
- HMCS Fundy underway

Class overview
- Name: Fundy class
- Builders: Burrard Dry Dock Co. Ltd.; Collingwood Shipyards Ltd.; Morton Engineering & Dry Dock Co.; Yarrows Ltd.
- Operators: Royal Canadian Navy
- Succeeded by: Bangor class
- Built: 1938
- In commission: 1 September 1938 – 29 July 1945
- Completed: 4
- Retired: 4

General characteristics
- Type: Minesweeper
- Displacement: 460 long tons (470 t)
- Length: 163 ft (49.7 m)
- Beam: 27.5 ft (8.4 m)
- Draught: 14.5 ft (4.4 m)
- Installed power: 1-cylinder boiler 850–950 ihp (630–710 kW)
- Propulsion: 1 shaft, vertical triple expansion engine
- Speed: 12 knots (22 km/h; 14 mph)
- Endurance: 180–196 long tons (183–199 t) coal
- Complement: 38
- Armament: 1 × QF 4 in (102 mm) Mk IV gun; 2 × 20 mm Oerlikon AA cannons

The Fundy-class minesweepers were a class of four minesweepers operated by the Royal Canadian Navy during the Second World War. All four ships entered service in 1938 and the class were discarded in 1945, sold for mercantile service. Three ended up sold to Chinese interests, while one remained active in Canada until 1987.

The class derives its name from the lead ship HMCS Fundy and are all named after bays in Canada. The Fundy-class minesweepers were modified versions of the British Basset-class trawler minesweepers. The Canadian ships were given extra strengthening for ice conditions. Two were initially assigned to the West Coast of Canada and two, including Fundy, to the East Coast.

== Design and description ==
By 1930 the Battle-class trawlers which had been re-designated as minesweepers in November 1922 were coming to the end of their effective service lives. In 1935, all three remaining minesweepers active in the Royal Canadian Navy were laid up. In the naval estimates of the 1936 budget, provision was made to replace two of the Battle class with two new, modern minesweepers.

In 1938 four hulls were laid down in four shipyards across the country to be completed by the end of the year. The two minesweepers built on the East Coast would cost $318,000 per vessel and the two constructed on the West Coast, $403,000 per vessel. At the outbreak of the Second World War, the Royal Canadian Navy considered constructing more, but chose to build Bangor-class minesweepers instead upon learning of that design. The Bangors burned oil instead of coal and had much greater endurance.

The vessels, based on the British Basset-class trawlers, displaced 460 long tons (470 t). They were 163 ft (49.7 m) long, with a beam of 27.5 ft (8.4 m) and a draught of 14.5 ft (4.4 m). They had a complement of 3 officers and 35 ratings.

The Fundy class was propelled by one shaft driven by a vertical triple expansion engine powered by steam from a one-cylinder boiler. This created between 850–950 indicated horsepower (630–710 kW) and gave the minesweepers a top speed of 12 knots (22 km/h; 14 mph). The ships were capable of carrying between 180–196 long tons (183–199 t) of coal.

The ships were armed with either one QF 4-inch (102 mm) Mk IV gun mounted forward on a raised platform, or with one QF 12-pounder 12 cwt naval gun. (Note: Mark IV = Mark 4. Britain used Roman numerals to denote Marks (models) of ordnance until after World War II.) The minesweepers were armed with two 20 mm Oerlikon anti-aircraft cannon. They were later equipped with 25 depth charges.

== Ships in class ==
Ship	Original pennant	Builder	Laid down	Launched	Commissioned	Paid off	Fate
Fundy	J88	Collingwood Shipyards Ltd., Collingwood	24 January 1938	18 June 1938	1 September 1938	27 July 1945	Sold in 1947 into mercantile service to Marine Industries Ltd. Sold around 1960 to Rail & Water Terminals in St-Joseph-de-la-Rive and rebuilt as a diesel coaster named Aigle Marin. Resold c. 1972 and renamed Anne R.D. Scrapped in 1987.
Gaspe	J94	Morton Engineering & Dry Dock Co., Quebec City	24 January 1938	12 August 1938	21 October 1938	23 July 1945	Sold in 1946 into mercantile service as the tugboat Sung Li.
Nootka	J35	Yarrows Ltd., Esquimalt	1 February 1938	26 September 1938	6 December 1938	29 July 1945	Renamed Nanoose (J35) in 1943. Sold in 1956 into mercantile service as the tugboat Sung Ling.
Comox	J64	Burrard Dry Dock Co. Ltd., Vancouver	5 February 1938	9 August 1938	23 November 1938	27 July 1945	Sold in 1946 into mercantile service as the tugboat Sung Ming.

== Service history ==
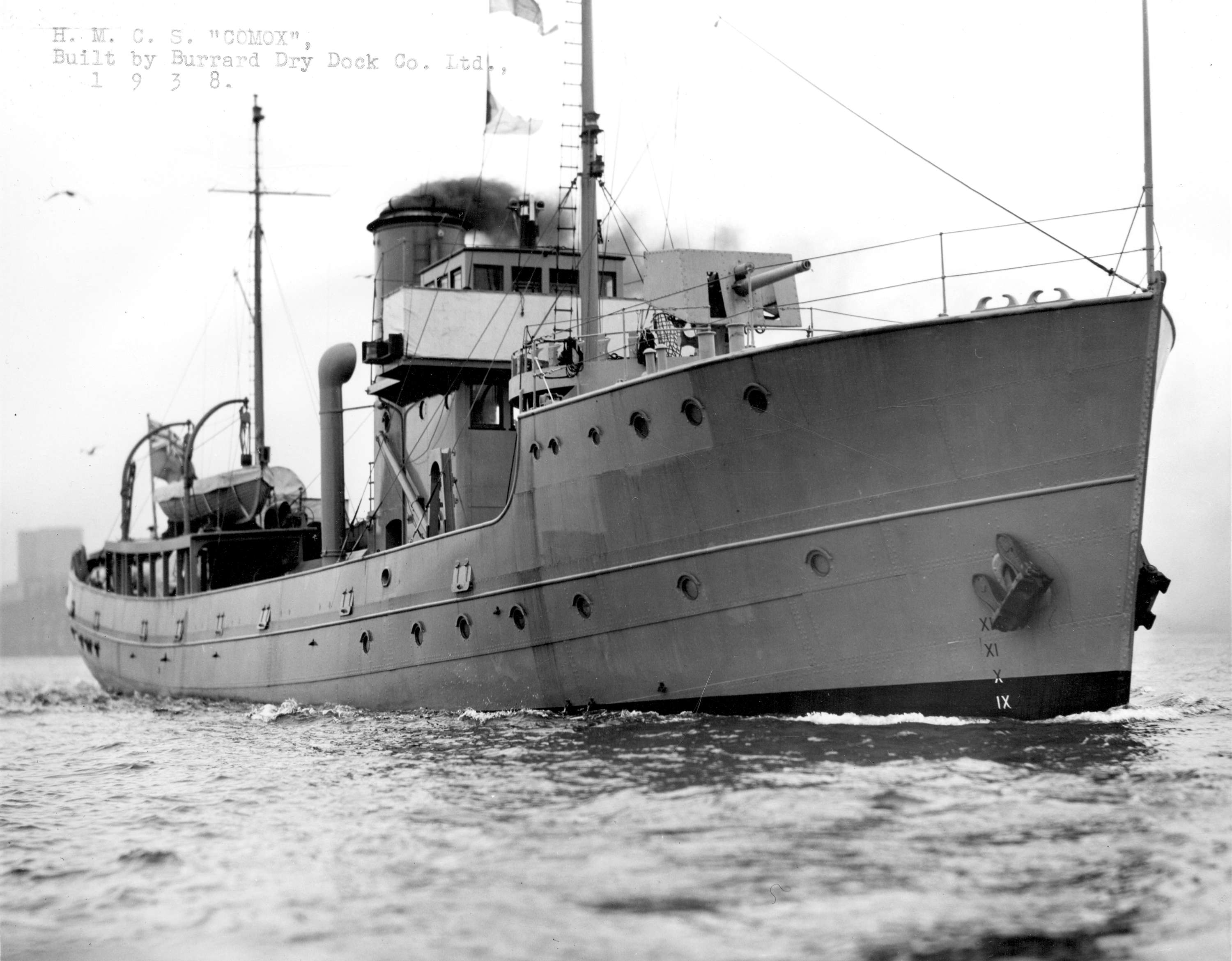
Comox underway

The class was ordered from four different shipyards spread across Canada. Fundy was ordered from Collingwood Shipyards Ltd in Ontario and launched on 18 June 1938; Comox from Burrard Dry Dock in British Columbia, launched on 9 August 1938; Gaspé from Morton Engineering Co in Quebec, launched on 12 August 1938 and Nootka from Yarrows Limited in British Columbia, launched on 26 September 1938.

Initially Comox and Nootka were stationed on the Pacific coast, with Gaspé and Fundy on the East Coast. They continued this way even after the outbreak of the Second World War, until March 1940 when Comox and Nootka were transferred to the East Coast. During the war they spent most of their time performing minesweeping duties around Halifax.

In July 1942, Fundy was used as to escort a convoy from Halifax to Boston, Massachusetts and another back to Halifax in the Battle of the Atlantic. On 1 April 1943, Nootka was renamed Nanoose in order to release her original name to a newly constructed destroyer. In January 1945, Fundy and Comox rescued survivors from the merchant vessel Martin Van Buren which had been torpedoed.

In July 1945, all four ships were paid off to be sold into mercantile service. Three were sold to Chinese interests in 1946 and converted into tugboats. Comox was renamed Sung Ming, Gaspé renamed Sung Li, and Nanoose renamed Sung Ling. Fundy was sold to Marine Industries in 1947 where she was converted for mercantile purposes. Her career ended in 1987 when the ship was broken up at La Malbaie, Quebec.

== See also ==
- List of ships of the Royal Canadian Navy
