= Jill L. McNitt-Gray =

Biomechanist researcher from the USA

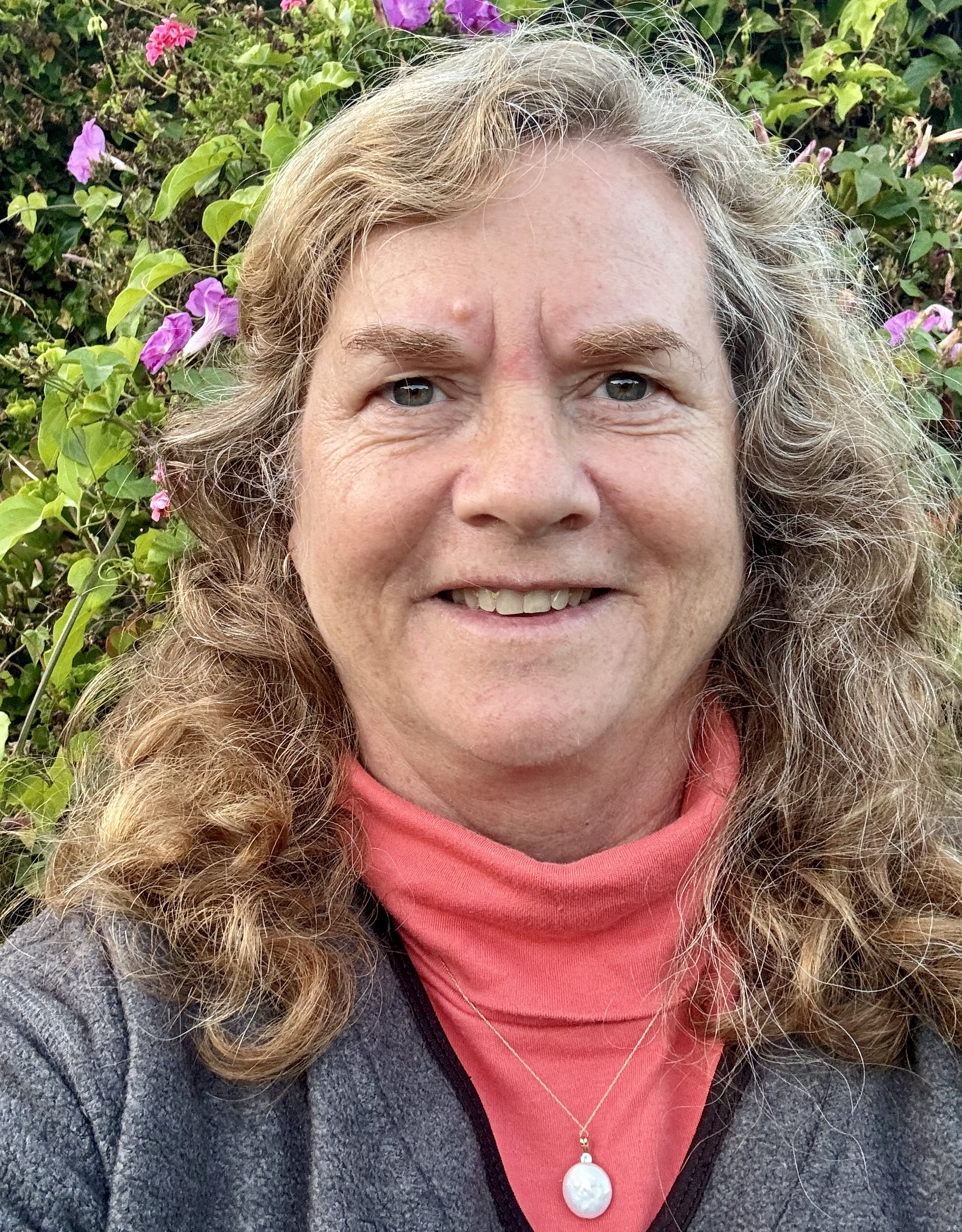
- Education: The Pennsylvania State University, University Park, PA, USA (PhD); The University of North Carolina, Chapel Hill, NC, USA (MA); Miami University, Oxford, OH, USA (AB)
- Occupation: Researcher
- Employer: University of Southern California
- Known for: Research in biomechanics and control during physically demanding tasks
- Awards: 2016 Jim Hay Memorial Award, American Society of Biomechanics
- Website: dornsife.usc.edu/profile/jill-l-mcnitt-gray/

Jill McNitt-Gray is an American biomechanist and Gabilan Distinguished Professor of Science and Engineering at the University of Southern California (USC). She researches human movement, biomechanical load, and performance in both athletic and clinical contexts. She has received awards and fellowships from the American Society of Biomechanics, the International Society of Biomechanics, the National Academy of Kinesiology, and others.

== Education ==
McNitt-Gray completed an undergraduate degree in 1980 from Miami University. She studied mathematics and statistics and completed a certificate in coaching. In 1985 she earned a master's degree from the University of North Carolina at Chapel Hill in biomechanics. While earning her master's degree she also worked for the university as an assistant coach of the women's gymnastics team. In 1989 she completed a PhD in biomechanics at Penn State University.

== Research and career ==
McNitt-Gray is the Gabilan Distinguished Professor of Science and Engineering at the University of Southern California (USC). She has worked with USA Track and Field long jump and triple jump athletes to improve the biomechanics of their jump velocity and angle. She has worked with Olympic and Paralympic athletes across gymnastics, diving, volleyball and basketball, and served as a biomechanist for the International Olympic Committee, the US Olympic Committee and the National Collegiate Athletic Association.

She was a founding member of National Biomechanics Day (now international, The Biomechanics Initiative), which provides informal educational experiences in biomechanics and science, technology, engineering and mathematics (STEM).

Her research focus is the neuromuscular control and dynamics of human movements in real-world contexts for both elite athletes and clinical populations.

She uses modeling approaches to investigate the control and dynamics of movement, focusing on how the neuromuscular system strategically prepares for high velocity interactions with the ground (e.g. landings) to satisfy task performance objectives while effectively mitigating detrimental mechanical loading that may cause injury.

She has collaborated with clinical partners and industry professionals to identify strategies for improving performance, personalizing the fit of assistive devices such as wheelchairs for individuals with disabilities, and translating research into clinical practice to preserve function, health, and well-being across the lifespan.

McNitt-Gray collaborates with professional sports coaches to optimise movement technique and performance whilst limiting injury potential of elite athletes across gymnastics, basketball, long jump, triple jump, and diving.

== Honors ==
McNitt-Gray was selected as a Fellow for the American Society of Biomechanics (ASB) in 2013, the International Society of Biomechanics (ISB) in 2015, and the National Academy of Kinesiology in 2022.

She received the ASB Jim Hay Memorial Award in 2016. As of 2023, she was one of only two women to receive the award.

Mcnitt-Gray also received the Jean Landa Pytel Award in 2020. She received the 2023 Geoffrey Dyson Award from the International Society of Biomechanics in Sport (ISBS).

== Leadership ==
McNitt-Gray served on the ASB Membership Committee (1989–92), and on the ASB Executive Board as Education Chair (1993–95) and Program Chair (2002). She was elected to President of ASB in 2010 and made a Fellow of ASB in 2013.

She served on the ISB Executive Council as Liaison to Affiliated and Economically Developing Societies (2005–2007).

== Selected works ==
- McNitt-Gray, J. L., Sand, K., Ramos, C., Peterson, T., Held, L., & Brown, K. (2015). Using technology and engineering to facilitate skill acquisition and improvements in performance. Proceedings of the Institution of Mechanical Engineers, Part P: Journal of Sports Engineering and Technology, 229(2), 103–115. https://doi.org/10.1177/1754337114565381
- McNitt-Gray, J. L., Yokoi, T., & Millward, C. (1994). Landing Strategies Used by Gymnasts on Different Surfaces. Journal of Applied Biomechanics, 10(3), 237–252. https://doi.org/10.1123/jab.10.3.237
- McNitt-Gray, J. L., Yokoi, T., & Millward, C. (1993). Landing Strategy Adjustments Made by Female Gymnasts in Response to Drop Height and Mat Composition. Journal of Applied Biomechanics, 9(3), 173–190. https://doi.org/10.1123/jab.9.3.173
- McNitt-Gray, J. L. (1993). Kinetics of the lower extremities during drop landings from three heights. Journal of Biomechanics, 26(9), 1037–1046. https://doi.org/10.1016/S0021-9290(05)80003-X
- McNitt-Gray, J. L. (1991). Kinematics and Impulse Characteristics of Drop Landings from Three Heights. Journal of Applied Biomechanics, 7(2), 201–224. https://doi.org/10.1123/ijsb.7.2.201
