= Ruth Glassow =

(1891-1988) movement scientist, kinesiologist and educator

Ruth Glassow (19 December 1891 – 26 August 1988) was a movement scientist, kinesiologist and educator who was a graduate of the faculty member of the University of Wisconsin–Madison from 1930 to 1962. She was a professor of physical education and dance there from 1946 to 1962.

== Education ==
Glassow graduated from the University of Wisconsin–Madison in 1916 and completed her masters degree at Teacher's College, Columbia University.

== Career ==
Glassow returned to the University of Wisconsin in 1930 where she was first a lecturer in kinesiology and biomechanics. Prior to this appointment, she held teaching positions at the University of Illinois Chicago and then in Oregon. In 1946, Glassow became a professor of physical education and dance. She would hold this position until her retirement in 1962.

During her career she made great contributions in regard to the study of human movement and was a pioneer in filming human movement starting from the early 1930s. In her classes Glassow would, with her students, use motion pictures to analyze joint actions in sports skills and study patterns used in movements like throwing, running and jumping in children.

In 1965 Glassow went to Purdue University as a visiting professor and helped develop undergraduate and graduate programs in the field of human movement. Her guidance and help establishing important links in this was viewed as a major triumph for the university and led to the creation of their Department of the Health and Kinesiology.

She retired in 1966 and later died on 26 August 1988 at Madison, Wisconsin.

== Publications ==
Glassow published two manuals focused on physical education: Fundamentals of Physical Education in 1932 and Measuring Achievement in Physical Education in 1938. In 1950 she published a manual entitled A laboratory manual for functional kinesiology which was followed, in 1963, by the simply titled text Kinesiology which she coauthored with John Cooper which was released in multiple editions.

== Awards and recognition ==
Inducted in 1950, she is Fellow #88 in the National Academy of Kinesiology (formerly American Academy of Physical Education; American Academy of Kinesiology and Physical Education), which also recognized her with their highest honor, the Hetherington Award, in 1970.

In 1964 she won the Luther Halsey Gulick Award, conferred by the American Alliance for Health, Physical Education, Recreation and Dance, where she was recognized for her work as a teacher, researcher and author and it was stated that: "her greatest contribution may be her inspiration and influence on her graduate students, where her key mind and skillful guidance have stimulated hundreds to higher standards of excellence".

In 1989, after her death, she was made a fellow of International Society of Biomechanics in sports.

== Legacy ==
Glassow is now recognized as a pioneer in the field of biomechanics and The Ruth B Glassow Biomechanics Award offered by the National Association for Sport and Physical Education is named for her. This annual award honors a biomechanics scholar who has made significant contributions to applied biomechanics research.
