= HMCS Nootka (R96) =

Destroyer of the Royal Canadian Navy

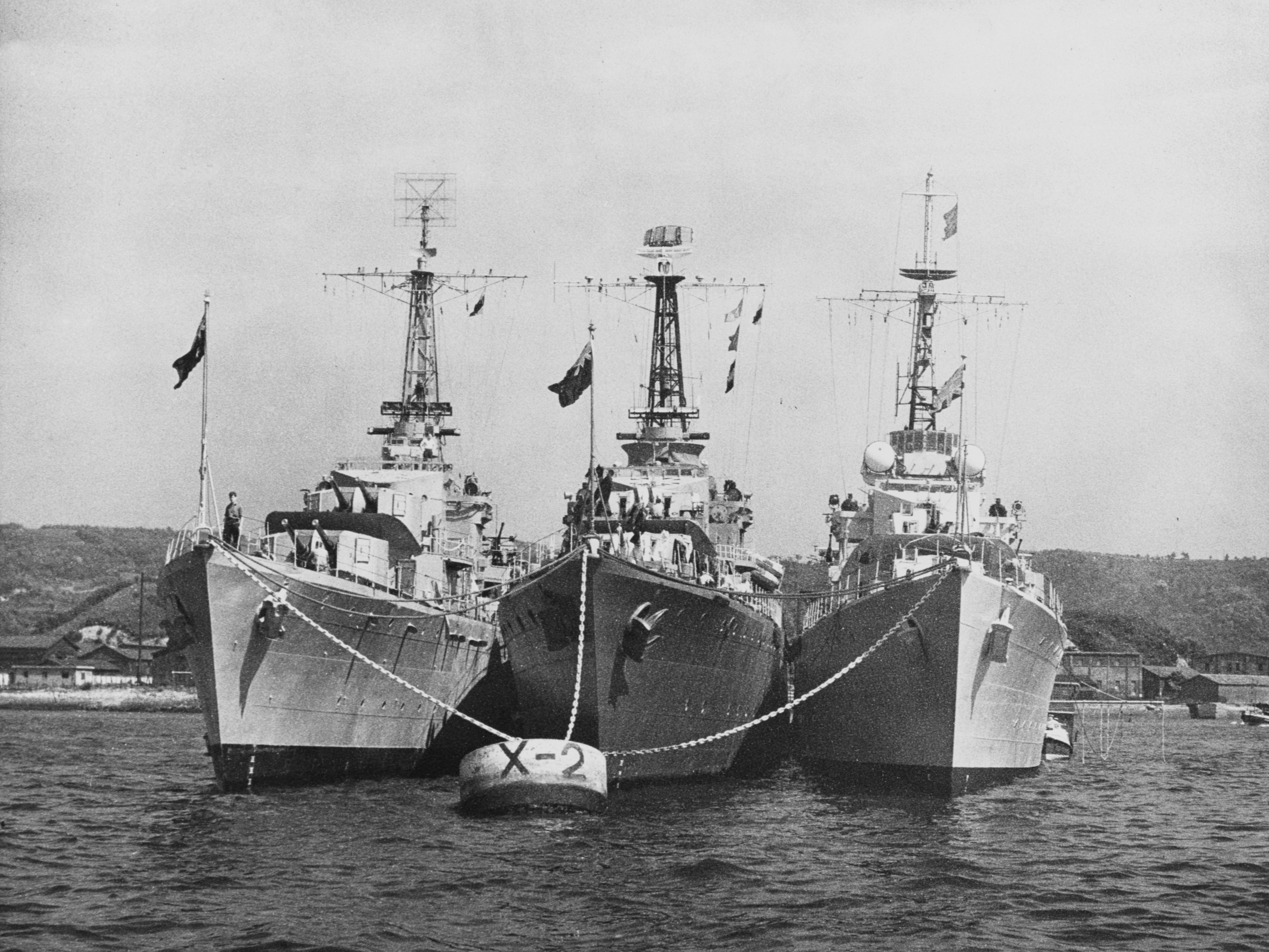
- HMCS Nootka (centre) in 1951

History

Canada
- Name: Nootka
- Namesake: Nuu-chah-nulth people
- Builder: Halifax Shipyards, Halifax, Nova Scotia, Canada
- Cost: $6 million
- Laid down: 20 May 1942
- Launched: 26 April 1944
- Commissioned: 9 August 1946
- Decommissioned: 6 February 1964
- Identification: R96 (1946–1949); DDE 213 (1950–1964)
- Motto: Tikegh mamook solleks (Ready to fight)
- Honours and awards: Korea, 1951–1952
- Fate: Scrapped at Faslane, Scotland in 1965.
- Notes: Colours are white and royal blue.
- Badge: Azure, in base barry wavy of four argent and azure, a killer whale (Orca) proper rising from the sea.

General characteristics as built
- Class & type: Tribal-class destroyer
- Displacement: 1,927 long tons (1,958 t) standard; 2,745 long tons (2,789 t) at deep load
- Length: 335 ft 6 in (102.3 m) pp; 377 ft (114.9 m) oa
- Beam: 36 ft 6 in (11.13 m)
- Draught: 13 ft (4.0 m)
- Installed power: 2 × Parsons single-reduction geared turbines; 3 × Admiralty-type three-drum boilers
- Propulsion: 2 × shafts, 44,000 shp (32,811 kW)
- Speed: 36.5 knots (67.6 km/h; 42.0 mph)
- Range: 5,700 nmi (10,600 km; 6,600 mi) at 15 knots (28 km/h; 17 mph)
- Endurance: 505–516 long tons (513–524 t) fuel oil
- Complement: 259
- Sensors & processing systems: Type 291 radar (air search); Type 293 radar (target indication); Type 285 radar (fire control)
- Armament: As built; 4 × twin 4 in (102 mm)/45 QF Mk XVI (HA); 2 × twin 40 mm Bofors RP.50 Mk V; 2 × single 40 mm Bofors Mk VII; 2 × twin 20 mm Oerlikon Mk VC; 1 × quad 21 inch (533 mm) torpedoes (Mk IX); 1953 refit; 2 × twin 4 in (102 mm)/45 QF Mk XVI (HA); 1 × twin 3 in (76 mm) Mk 22 (HA); 4 x single 40 mm Bofors Boffin; 1 × quad 21 inch (533 mm) torpedoes (Mk IX); 2 × triple 12 in (305 mm) Squid anti-submarine mortars

HMCS Nootka was a Tribal-class destroyer that served in the Royal Canadian Navy (RCN) from 1946 to 1964. Constructed too late to take part in the Second World War, the ship saw service in the Korean War. She received the unit name Nootka while still under construction in Halifax, Nova Scotia after the RCN renamed the Fundy-class minesweeper Nootka (J35) to Nanoose (J35) in 1943. Nootka was the second Canadian Tribal to be constructed in Canada and the second Canadian warship to circumnavigate the world. The ship was sold for scrap and broken up at Faslane, Scotland in 1965.

== Design ==
The Tribal class were ordered by the Canadian Naval Staff's intent to build a stronger, permanent force. The Tribals were designed to fight heavily armed destroyers of other navies, such as the Japanese Fubuki class. Canada chose the design based on its armament, with the size and power of the Tribal class allowing them to act more like small cruisers than as fleet destroyers. The Naval Staff intended to order the construction of a flotilla of Tribals, with two under construction every year. However, due to war demands, British yards could not accommodate such a request. Therefore, it was decided that Canadian shipyards would construct the second batch of Tribals. They were ordered with modified ventilation and heating systems for North Atlantic winter service. Design modifications were made after deficiencies were noted in Iroquois, the lead ship of the Canadian Tribals. Canadian Tribals were a foot longer than their British counterparts and carried an auxiliary boiler for heating and additional power requirements.

During construction delays soon began due to a shortage of skilled labour and engineering personnel. Furthermore, on the first batch, Micmac and Nootka, there was a shortage of high-quality steel in Canada required in the construction of destroyers. The steel was imported from the United States. By the time the second batch of Canadian-built Tribals, Cayuga and the second Athabaskan, began construction, Canada was capable of providing the steel.

== Description ==
=== Initial design ===
The ship was 335 feet 6 inches (102.3 m) long between perpendiculars and 377 feet (114.9 m) long overall with a beam of 36 feet 6 inches (11.1 m) and a draught of 13 feet (4.0 m). As built, the destroyer had a standard displacement of 1,927 long tons (1,958 t) and 2,745 long tons (2,789 t) at deep load. Nootka had a complement of 14 officers and 245 ratings. The destroyer was propelled by two shafts driven by two Parsons single-reduction geared turbines powered by steam created by three Admiralty-type three-drum boilers. Each boiler was housed in a separate compartment and were rated at 300 lbf/in^{2} (2,100 kPa; 21 kgf/cm^{2}). This created 44,000 shaft horsepower (33,000 kW) and gave the ship a maximum speed of 36.5 knots (67.6 km/h; 42.0 mph). The destroyers could carry 505–516 long tons (513–524 t) of fuel oil. Tribals had poor freeboard and were considered "wet" ships. They had a range of 5,700 nautical miles (10,600 km; 6,600 mi) at 15 knots (28 km/h; 17 mph).

As built, Nootka was fitted with six quick firing 4.7-inch (119 mm) Mk XII guns placed in three twin turrets, designated 'A', 'B' and 'Y' from bow to stern. (Note: Mark XII = Mark 12. Britain used Roman numerals to denote Marks (models) of ordnance until after the Second World War.) The turrets were placed on 40° mountings with open-backed shields. The ship also had one twin turret of QF 4-inch (102 mm) Mk XVI guns in the 'X' position. The mounts were powered by turbo generators and turbo-hydraulic units. For secondary anti-aircraft armament, Nootka was fitted with twin Mk 5 40 mm Bofors guns situated side by side. The vessel was also fitted with four 21-inch (533 mm) torpedo tubes in one quad mounting, situated behind the second funnel for Mk IX torpedoes. Along the stern of the ships were racks for depth charges positioned along the centreline, holding six depth charges at a time and space for nine reloads. A depth charge thrower was set high on each side of the superstructure ahead of the tripod main mast.

The ship was equipped Type 291 radar for air search, Type 293 radar for target indication and Type 285 for 4.7-inch gun control and a DCT controller, utilizing a Fuze Keeping Clock, for the 4-inch guns (working with the Type 285 radar). The radar was carried on a lattice mast and the HF/DF was situated on a pole aft.

=== Refit and alterations ===
In 1949, Nootka underwent a conversion to a destroyer escort (DDE). The DDE conversion was composed of removing the existing 4.7-inch armament and replacing the 'A' and 'X' mounts with twin 4-inch mounts to give the ship uniform armament. The 'Y' mount was replaced by two triple-barrelled Mark IV Squid anti-submarine mortars. In 1951, the ship underwent another alteration, replacing the 4-inch gun in 'X' mount with a twin 3-inch (76 mm)/50 caliber gun mount. The secondary armament was also upgraded, with four single 40 mm Bofors guns also installed. The 4-inch guns, all Mk XVI, were controlled by the US Mark 63 fire control system, replacing the DCT controller and the vessels were fitted with SPS-6C air search and Sperry surface search radar. Nootka's final sensor layout was the SPS-6C, SPS-10, Type 293 and Type 262 radars and Type 170 and Type 174 sonars. A short, aluminum lattice mast was installed and the funnels were capped.

== Construction and career ==
Nootka was ordered as part of the 1942–43 building programme by the RCN in June 1941. The second Tribal to be constructed in Canada, the ship's keel was laid down on 20 May 1942 at Halifax Shipyards in Halifax, Nova Scotia. Construction of the ship was slowed by a shortage of skilled labour and engineering personnel. By the end of 1943, Nootka's construction was several months behind schedule. This delayed the construction of the fourth Canadian-built Tribal as there were only two slips at Halifax capable of building the destroyers. Further delays were caused by the contractor for the ships' boilers ad engines, John Inglis Company. The contractor had been overwhelmed by the complexity of the design and the engines for the first Canadian Tribal, Micmac arrived only one full year after the ship's launch. Nootka was christened by Miss R. Gallant, a shipyard employee and named for the Nuu-chah-nulth people, formerly called the "Nootka", an aboriginal people of the Canadian Pacific Coast. The destroyer was launched on 26 April 1944 and commissioned into the RCN on 7 August 1946, performing sea trials off of Halifax.

After commissioning, Nootka served as a training ship for the Atlantic Fleet. She was one of the ships assigned to take part in Operation Scuttled, the training exercise designed to sink U-190, a German U-boat that had surrendered to the RCN at the end of the Second World War. However, before Nootka and her fellow ships could find the range on the submarine, the aircraft of the Naval Air Arm successfully attacked the vessel and sank her. In September 1948, she joined the aircraft carrier HMCS Magnificent and sister ship HMCS Haida on a training cruise to the Ungava Peninsula in Quebec. There the two destroyers left the aircraft carrier and toured the north, visiting Churchill, Manitoba, becoming the first RCN warships to penetrate Hudson Bay. She remained as a training vessel until her conversion to a destroyer escort after being paid off on 15 August 1949.

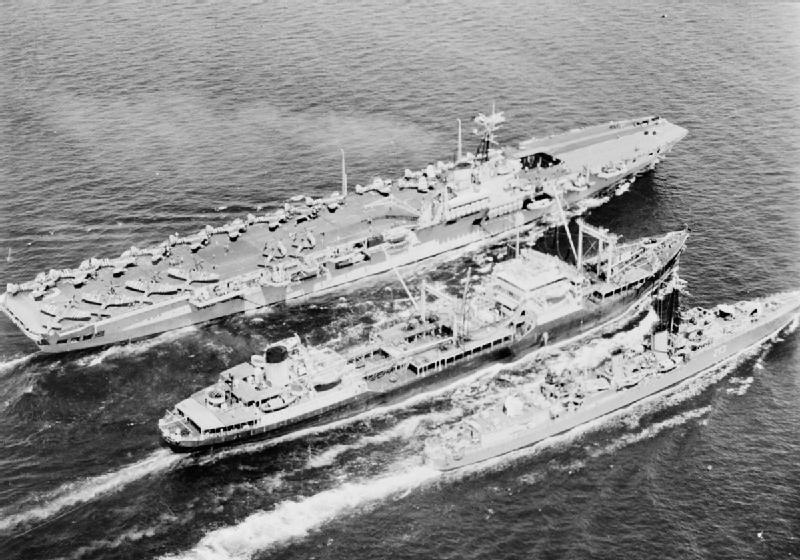
RFA Wave Sovereign replenishing HMS Ocean and HMCS Nootka off Korea, 1952

During the Korean War, Canada rotated its destroyers in and out of the theatre. Nootka departed from Halifax on 25 November 1950 and transited the Panama Canal for the first of two tours of duty. On her first tour, she relieved HMCS Sioux, taking her place as one of the three Canadian destroyers assigned to the region. On 25 January, she was sent for shore bombardment duties in the Inchon area in January and was fired upon by Communist guns. For the first three months of 1951, the three Canadian destroyers in theatre spent the majority of their time screening aircraft carriers and performing inshore patrols. On 16 March 1950 she became the Senior Officer's Ship for the Canadian force in the theatre, replacing Cayuga. In early April 1951, Nootka was assigned to the west coast blockade patrol. On 13–14 May, Nootka captured two junks, five sampans and 28 prisoners after encountering a Chinese fishing fleet off the west coast. Later in May, the destroyer transferred to the east coast, performing bombardment, aircraft carrier screening and patrol missions. Nootka sailed for home on 20 July, replaced by Cayuga.

Her second tour in Korean waters took place from 12 February 1952 until 9 February 1952. Nootka was assigned to the Island Campaign on the west coast, supporting guerrillas and Republic of Korea troops in the islands around Chodo. The ship took part in the Island Campaign in the Haeju region in March. For the majority of 1952, Nootka supported the Island campaign off the west coast. During one inshore patrol around the islands on 26 September, Nootka sank a North Korean minelaying junk, rescuing its crew of five. She returned to Halifax on 17 December 1952 via the Mediterranean Sea, having become the second Canadian warship to circumnavigate the globe and the first destroyer to do so by the Suez Canal. Nootka underwent further conversion and modernization in 1953–1954 and resumed training duties with the Atlantic Fleet. In January 1958, Nootka collided with HMCS Algonquin while operating in the Atlantic with the First Canadian Escort Squadron. She participated in the massive RCN deployment for the Cuban Missile Crisis in 1962; Nootka was assigned a patrol area off the northern tip of Cuba during the crisis.

In summer 1963, Nootka joined Haida for a tour of the Great Lakes. Her last deployment was for a NATO exercise in Bermuda in fall 1963 where she sustained hull damage while docking in strong winds. She was temporarily patched and returned to Halifax and was decommissioned at Halifax on 6 February 1964. She was scrapped at Faslane, Scotland in 1965.
