= International Society of Biomechanics =

International biomechanics organization

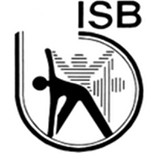
- Formation: August 29th, 1973
- Website: http://www.isbweb.org/

The International Society of Biomechanics, commonly known as the ISB, is a society dedicated to promoting biomechanics in its various forms. It promotes the study of all areas of biomechanics at the international level, although special emphasis is given to the biomechanics of human movement. The Society encourages international contacts amongst scientists, promotes the dissemination of knowledge, and forms liaisons with national organizations. The Society's membership includes scientists from a variety of disciplines including anatomy, physiology, engineering (mechanical, industrial aerospace, etc.), orthopedics, rehabilitation medicine, sport science and medicine, ergonomics, electro-physiological kinesiology and others.

== History ==
The decision to establish the society was made at the 3rd International Seminar on Biomechanics held in Rome in 1971. This meeting was organized by the “Working Group on Biomechanics” which was part of the International Council of Sport and Physical Education, which itself was part of the United Nations Educational, Scientific, and Cultural Organization (UNESCO). At this meeting on September 29 it was voted to form the ISB at the next meeting. The 4th International Seminar on Biomechanics was held at Penn State University from August 26 until August 31, 1973. The constitution was voted on and approved on August 29. Two hundred and fifty of those present became charter members of the society.

== Executive Council ==
The ISB is governed by its Executive Council. This council is elected every two years, by ballot, and is composed of officers and council members that represent countries from throughout the world and scientific areas that span all facets of biomechanics. The council, which meets annually, provides leadership for the continued development of the Society. Many on-going activities are performed by Council appointed sub-committees. The council also publishes a quarterly newsletter, known as ISB NOW, to inform members of Society developments and future events.

== Congresses ==
The ISB was formed in 1973 and has held a conference every other year since then. The counting of the congress started with the 1st International Seminar on Biomechanics held in Zurich in 1967. The list of conferences and their geographical locations are given below.

Conference Number	Year	Location
I	1967	Zurich, Switzerland
II	1969	Eindhoven, Netherlands
III	1971	Rome, Italy
IV	1973	State College, USA
V	1975	Jyvaskyla, Finland
VI	1977	Copenhagen, Denmark
VII	1979	Warsaw, Poland
VIII	1981	Nagoya, Japan
IX	1983	Waterloo, Canada
X	1985	Umea, Sweden
XI	1987	Amsterdam, Netherlands
XII	1989	Los Angeles, USA
XIII	1991	Perth, Australia
XIV	1993	Paris, France
XV	1995	Jyvaskyla, Finland
XVI	1997	Tokyo, Japan
XVII	1999	Calgary, Canada
XVIII	2001	Zurich, Switzerland
XIX	2003	Dunedin, New Zealand
XX	2005	Cleveland, USA
XXI	2007	Taipei, Taiwan
XXII	2009	Cape Town, South Africa
XXIII	2011	Brussels, Belgium
XXIV	2013	Natal, Brazil
XXV	2015	Glasgow, Scotland
XXVI	2017	Brisbane, Australia
XXVII	2019	Calgary, Canada
XXVIII	2021	Stockholm, Sweden (virtual)
XXIX	2023	Fukuoka, Japan
XXX	2025	Stockholm, Sweden

== Wartenweiler Memorial Lecture ==
At each ISB Congress the Wartenweiler Memorial Lecture is presented. This lecture is named to honor Jurg Wartenweiler (1915-1976) who was the first president of the ISB. He organized The First International Seminar on Biomechanics in Zürich, Switzerland in 1967. This conference eventually morphed into the biennial ISB Congresses. He was a faculty member at the ETH Zürich. Typically this lecture has been the first academic presentation of the conference. The list of Wartenweiler Memorial Lecturers and their topics follow.

Year	Speaker	Topic
1977	Giovanni A. Cavagna	Efficiency and inefficiency of locomotion.
1979	Marian Alan Weiss	Tasks and needs of rehabilitation engineering.
1981	Phillip D. Gollnick	Muscle characteristics and biomechanics.
1983	Uros Stanic	Movement and electrical stimulation.
1985	Don B. Chaffin	Computerized models for occupational biomechanics.
1987	Savio Woo	Advances in ligament research.
1989	Benno Nigg	Approaches to load analysis for reduction of sports injuries.
1991	James G. Hay	Biomechanics of long jumping.
1993	Carlo A. De Luca	Limitations of EMG in biomechanics research.
1995	David A. Winter	Biokinetics: The synergies of human movement.
1997	V. Reggie Edgerton	Force transmissions in mammalian skeletal muscles.
1999	Andrew Huxley	Crossbridge action: Present views, prospects & unknowns.
2001	Richard C. Nelson	The history of ISB.
2003	Steven Vogel	Twist versus bend: Flexibility in the face of flow.
2005	Bruce Latimer	Biomechanics and evolution.
2007	Kai-Nan An	Application of medical imaging in biomechanics.
2009	Patrick Prendergast	Mechanoregulation in the skeletal tissues.
2011	Jan Pieter Clarys	The schizophrenic balance of old techniques and new technologies in body composition and their (assumed) support in biomechanics, ergonomics and health care.
2013	Miguel Nicolelis	Brain machine interfaces to restore mobility.
2015	Aurelio Cappozzo	History of Biomechanics
2017	Jaap Van Dieen	Trunk stabilization, adaptations to environment, task and pain
2019	Hugh Herr	On the design of bionic leg devices: the science of tissue-synthetic interface
2021	Susan S. Margulies	Bridging the species gap: Scaling traumatic brain injury loads and assessments across species to accelerate prevention and diagnosis
2023	Julie Steele	Pioneering Women of ISB: Tales from the Archives and Beyond

== Muybridge Award ==
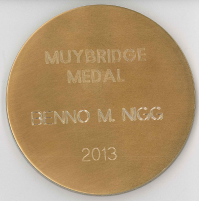
The Muybridge Medal

At the ISB Congress every two years, the ISB presents the Muybridge Award. This award is the most prestigious award of the Society and is awarded for career achievements in biomechanics. The award is named after Eadward Muybridge (1830-1904), who was one of the first to use cinematography for the study of human and animal movement. The list of Muybridge Award winners and their lecture topics follow,

Year	Speaker	Topic
1987	Peter R. Cavanagh	Studies in the biomechanics of distance running and plantar pressure distribution.
1989	Gunnar Andersson	Spine biomechanics.
1991	R. McNeil Alexander	Optimization of structure and movement of the legs of animals.
1993	Malcolm H. Pope	Spinal biomechanics.
1995	Savio L-Y. Woo	Biomechanics of knee ligament healing, repair and reconstruction.
1997	John Paul	Strength requirements for internal and external prostheses.
1999	Paavo Komi	Stretch-shortening cycle: a powerful model to study normal and fatigued muscle.
2001	David Winter	Gait and balance - from the micro to the macro.
2003	Tetsuo Fukunaga	Effects of elastic properties of muscle-tendon complex on sports performances.
2005	Rik Huiskes	Bone: The engineer's ultimate dream material
2007	Peter Huijing	Epimuscular myofascial force transmission: a historical review and implications for new research.
2009	Mimi Koehl	Effects of ambient wind or water flow on locomotion.
2011	Roger Enoka	Muscle fatigue – from motor units to clinical symptoms
2013	Benno Nigg	From biomechanik to biomechanics to biomechanigg
2015	Kai-Nan An	Biomechanics of Upper Extremities
2017	Walter Herzog	Reflections on Muscle: or the Accidental Scientist
2019	Ralph Müller	From mechanics to mechanomics: a journey through bone
2021	Scott Delp	How Muybridge predicted the future of biomechanics and what the 21st century holds
2023	Irene S. Davis	Born to Move: Embracing our Evolutionary Legacy

== Honorary Member ==
The ISB has a number of categories of membership including: student, charter, full, and emeritus. The remaining category is that of honorary member, which is restricted to a few individuals whose work has made outstanding contributions to the development of Biomechanics. The honorary membership currently consists of 16 individuals. Unfortunately some of these members have died (Levan Chkhaidze, James Hay, Ernst Jokl, Chauncey Morehouse, John Paul, Jacquelin Perry, David Winter). The other honorary members and their current academic affiliations are,

- Peter R. Cavanagh, University of Washington, USA
- Paavo Komi, University of Jyvaskyla, Finland
- Hideji Matsui, University of Nagoya, Japan
- Doris Miller, University of Western Ontario, Canada
- Mitsumasa Miyashita, University of Tokyo, Japan
- Richard C. Nelson, Penn State University, USA
- Benno Nigg, University of Calgary, Canada
- Robert Norman, University of Waterloo, Canada
- Fred Yeadon, Loughborough University, UK

== Affiliated Groups ==
Many other biomechanics groups and societies are affiliate members of the ISB. These groups include:

- American Society of Biomechanics
- Australian and New Zealand Society of Biomechanics
- Brazilian Society of Biomechanics
- British Association of Sport and Exercise Sciences
- Bulgarian Society of Biomechanics
- Canadian Society of Biomechanics
- Chinese Society of Sports Biomechanics
- Czech Society of Biomechanics
- Danish Society of Biomechanics
- German Society of Biomechanics
- Hellenic Society of Biomechanics (Greece)
- International Society of Biomechanics in Sports
- Japanese Society of Biomechanics
- Korean Society for Orthopaedic Research, Biomechanics, and Basic Science
- Polish Society of Biomechanics
- Portuguese Society of Biomechanics
- Russian Society of Biomechanics
- Societe de Biomecanique (France)
- Taiwanese Society of Biomechanics
- International Women in Biomechanics

== Technical and Working Groups ==
The Society also supports technical and working groups, which are groups of individuals dedicated to enhancing knowledge of specialized areas within biomechanics. Currently active technical sections include,

- Computer Simulation
- Shoulder Biomechanics
- Footwear Biomechanics
- 3-D Motion Analysis
