= List of corvettes of the Indian Navy =

In naval terminology, corvettes are considered as the smallest warship by its size, just below a frigate. The ships have played a significant role in the naval history of India. First ships of that category to have served the Indian Navy — Flower and Bathurst class — were commissioned during the World War II.

== Active ships ==
Corvette (23)
Class	Image	Boat	No.	Disp. (t)	Comm.	Origin	Homeport	Note
Arnala class	Arnala Sub-class	INS Arnala	P68	1,490	2025	India	Visakhapatnam	ASW SWC vessels for anti-submarine warfare in littoral waters. To replace the former Abhay-class corvette.
Arnala class	Arnala Sub-class	INS Androth	P69	1,490	2025	India	Visakhapatnam	ASW SWC vessels for anti-submarine warfare in littoral waters. To replace the former Abhay-class corvette.
Arnala class	Arnala Sub-class	INS Anjadip	P73	1,490	2026	India	Visakhapatnam	ASW SWC vessels for anti-submarine warfare in littoral waters. To replace the former Abhay-class corvette.
Arnala class	Arnala Sub-class	INS Agray	P36	1,490	2026	India	Visakhapatnam	ASW SWC vessels for anti-submarine warfare in littoral waters. To replace the former Abhay-class corvette.
Mahe class	Mahe sub-class	INS Mahe	P80	1,100	2025	India	Mumbai	ASW SWC vessels for anti-submarine warfare in littoral waters. To replace the former Abhay-class corvette.
Mahe class	Mahe sub-class	INS Malwan	P81	1,100	2026	India	Karwar	ASW SWC vessels for anti-submarine warfare in littoral waters. To replace the former Abhay-class corvette.
Kamorta class		INS Kamorta	P28	3,300	2014	India	Visakhapatnam	Dedicated anti-submarine warfare vessels.
Kamorta class		INS Kadmatt	P29	3,300	2016	India	Visakhapatnam	Dedicated anti-submarine warfare vessels.
Kamorta class		INS Kiltan	P30	3,300	2017	India	Visakhapatnam	Dedicated anti-submarine warfare vessels.
Kamorta class		INS Kavaratti	P31	3,300	2020	India	Visakhapatnam	Dedicated anti-submarine warfare vessels.
Kora class		INS Kora	P61	1,400	1998	India	Visakhapatnam	Dedicated anti-surface warfare vessels.
Kora class		INS Kirch	P62	1,400	2001	India	Visakhapatnam	Dedicated anti-surface warfare vessels.
Kora class		INS Kulish	P63	1,400	2001	India	Sri Vijaya Puram	Dedicated anti-surface warfare vessels.
Kora class		INS Karmuk	P64	1,400	2004	India	Sri Vijaya Puram	Dedicated anti-surface warfare vessels.
Khukri class		INS Kuthar	P46	1,350	1990	India	Visakhapatnam	Successor to the IN's Petya II corvettes.
Khukri class		INS Khanjar	P47	1,350	1991	India	Visakhapatnam	Successor to the IN's Petya II corvettes.
Veer class		INS Vibhuti	K45	455	1991	India	Mumbai	Customised derivative of the Tarantul-class corvette; used in an anti-surface role.
Veer class		INS Vipul	K46	455	1992	India	Mumbai	Customised derivative of the Tarantul-class corvette; used in an anti-surface role.
Veer class		INS Vinash	K47	455	1993	India	Mumbai	Customised derivative of the Tarantul-class corvette; used in an anti-surface role.
Veer class		INS Vidyut	K48	455	1995	India	Mumbai	Customised derivative of the Tarantul-class corvette; used in an anti-surface role.
Veer class		INS Nashak	K83	455	1994	India	Mumbai	Customised derivative of the Tarantul-class corvette; used in an anti-surface role.
Veer class		INS Pralaya	K91	455	2002	India	Mumbai	Customised derivative of the Tarantul-class corvette; used in an anti-surface role.
Veer class		INS Prabal	K92	455	2002	India	Mumbai	Customised derivative of the Tarantul-class corvette; used in an anti-surface role.

== Decommissioned ships ==
Ship	Pennant	Class	Commissioned	Decommissioned	Fate	Notes
Corvettes
HMIS Gondwana	K348	Flower class	15 May 1945	1946	returned to Royal Navy and sold to the Thai Navy as HTMS Bangpakong	
HMIS Sind	K274	Flower class	24 August 1945	1946	returned to Royal Navy and sold to the Thai Navy as HTMS Prasae	
HMIS Mahratta	K395	Flower class	1946		Constructive total loss after running aground in 1947.	
HMIS Assam	K306	Flower class	19 February 1945	1947	returned to Royal Navy and scrapped	
HMIS Punjab	J239	Bathurst class	20 March 1942	1949	Transferred to Pakistan post-partition	
HMIS Bombay renamed INS Bombay post republic.	J249	Bathurst class	24 April 1942	1960	scrapped	Was involved in defence during the attack on Sydney Harbour
HMIS Bengal renamed INS Bengal post republic.	J243	Bathurst class	8 August 1942	1960	scrapped	Sank the Imperial Japanese Navy commerce raider Hōkoku Maru in 1942 while in Indian service.
HMIS Madras renamed INS Madras post republic.	J237	Bathurst class	12 May 1942	1960	scrapped	
INS Arnala	P68	Arnala class	29 June 1972	9 April 1999		
INS Androth	P69	Arnala class	30 June 1972	9 April 1999		
INS Anjadip	P73	Arnala class	23 December 1972	13 December 2003		
INS Andaman	P74	Arnala class	28 December 1973		Lost in a storm 22 August 1990	
INS Amini	P75	Arnala class	12 December 1974	16 September 2002		
INS Kamorta	P77	Arnala class	21 November 1968	31 October 1991		
INS Kadmatt	P78	Arnala class	23 December 1968	30 November 1992		
INS Kiltan	P79	Arnala class	30 October 1969	30 June 1987		Participated in Operation Trident (1971).
INS Kavaratti	P80	Arnala class	23 December 1969	31 July 1986		Participated in Operation Trident (1971).
INS Katchall	P81	Arnala class	23 December 1969	31 December 1988		
INS Amindivi	P83	Arnala class		1986–88		
INS Hosdurg	K73	Durg class	15 January 1978	5 June 1999	Sunk in a Sea Eagle AShM test in June 2000.	
INS Vijaydurg	K71	Durg class	25 December 1976	30 September 2002		
INS Sindhudurg	K72	Durg class	29 May 1977	24 September 2004		
INS Prahar	K98	Veer Class	1 March 1997		Sunk in collision on 22 April 2006	
INS Veer	K40	Veer Class	26 March 1987	28 April 2016		
INS Nipat	K42	Veer Class	5 December 1988	28 April 2016		
INS Khukri	P49	Khukri Class	23 August 1989	23 December 2021	Preserved as museum in Diu, India	
INS Kirpan	P44	Khukri Class	16 August 1988	22 July 2023	Donated to Vietnam People's Navy	
INS Abhay	P33	Abhay-class	10 March 1989	10 March 2025		
INS Ajay	P34	Abhay-class	24 January 1990	19 September 2022		
INS Akshay	P35	Abhay-class	10 December 1990	3 June 2022		
INS Agray	P36	Abhay-class	30 January 1991	27 January 2017		
Anti-Submarine Naval Trawler
HMIS Agra	T254	Basset class				
HMIS Ahmedabad	T264	Basset class				
HMIS Amritsar	T261	Basset class				
HMIS Baroda	T249	Basset class		1948	Transferred to Pakistan	
HMIS Berar	T256	Basset class				
HMIS Calcutta	T339	Basset class				
HMIS Cochin	T315	Basset class				
HMIS Cuttack	T251	Basset class				
HMIS Karachi	T262	Basset class				
HMIS Lahore	T253	Basset class				
HMIS Lucknow	T267	Basset class				
HMIS Madura	T268	Basset class				
HMIS Multan	T322	Basset class				
HMIS Nagpur	T269	Basset class				
HMIS Nasik	T258	Basset class				
HMIS Patna	T255	Basset class				
HMIS Peshawar	T263	Basset class				
HMIS Poona	T260	Basset class				
HMIS Quetta	T332	Basset class				
HMIS Rampur	T212	Basset class		1948	Transferred to Pakistan	
HMIS Shillong	T250	Basset class				
HMIS Travancore	T312	Basset class				

== Future ships ==
Class	Picture	Type	No. of Ships	Origin	Displacement	Status	Note
Anti Submarine Warfare Shallow Water Craft		Corvette (ASW)	16	India	890–1,490 tonnes	6 Active; 1 Delivered; 8 Launched; 1 Under Construction	Designed for ASW roles in coastal waters. Out of the pending ships of this class, seven are being constructed by GRSE (Arnala sub-class) and eight by Cochin Shipyard (Mahe sub-class).
Next Generation Missile Vessels		Corvette (ASuW)	6	India	1,437 tonnes	1 under construction 5 planned	The contract for acquisition of six Next Generation Missile Vessels (NGMV) was signed with Cochin Shipyard Limited (CSL) at a cost of Rs 9,805 crore. The delivery of ships is scheduled to commence from March 2027 .
Next generation corvette		Corvette	8	India	3,500 tonnes	Planned	In May 2025, Garden Reach Shipbuilders & Engineers secured the lowest bidder (L1) position for constructing five Next Generation Corvettes (NGC) for the Indian Navy, under a ₹36,000 crore (US$4.3 billion) program approved by the Defence Acquisition Council. The contract for GRSE, valued at over ₹25,000 crore (US$3.0 billion), covers five of the eight NGCs, with the remaining three to be built by the second-lowest bidder (L2) at the same unit cost.

== See also ==
- List of active Indian Navy ships
- Future of the Indian Navy
- List of historical ships of the Indian Navy
- List of submarines of the Indian Navy
- List of destroyers of the Indian Navy
- List of frigates of the Indian Navy
- Weapon systems of the Indian Navy
