= List of ships of World War II (A) =

The List of ships of the Second World War contains major military vessels of the war, arranged alphabetically and by type. The list includes armed vessels that served during the war and in the immediate aftermath, inclusive of localized ongoing combat operations, garrison surrenders, post-surrender occupation, colony re-occupation, troop and prisoner repatriation, to the end of 1945. For smaller vessels, see also list of World War II ships of less than 1000 tons. Some uncompleted Axis ships are included, out of historic interest. Ships are designated to the country under which they operated for the longest period of the Second World War, regardless of where they were built or previous service history. Submarines show submerged displacement.

Click on headers to sort column alphabetically.

List of ships of World War II (A)
Ship	Country or organization	Class	Type	Displacement (tons)	First commissioned	Fate
Aaron Ward (DD-483)	United States Navy	Gleaves	destroyer	1,630	4 March 1942	Sunk 7 April 1943
Aaron Ward (DM-34)	United States Navy	Robert H. Smith	minelayer destroyer	2,200	28 October 1944	Constructive loss 30 April 1945, scrapped 1946
Abbot	United States Navy	Fletcher	destroyer	2,050	23 April 1943	Decommissioned 1965, scrapped 1975
Abdiel	Royal Navy	Abdiel	minelayer	2,650	15 April 1941	Sunk 10 September 1943
Abelia	Royal Navy	Flower	corvette	925	3 February 1941	Constructive loss 9 January 1944
Abercrombie	Royal Navy	Roberts	monitor	8,536	5 May 1943	Scrapped 1954
Abercrombie	United States Navy	John C. Butler	destroyer escort	1,350	1 May 1944	Decommissioned 1946, sunk as target 1968
Abner Read	United States Navy	Fletcher	destroyer	2,050	5 February 1943	Sunk 1 November 1944
Abukuma	Imperial Japanese Navy	Nagara	light cruiser	5,088	26 May 1925	Sunk 26 October 1944
Acasta	Royal Navy	A	destroyer	1,350	11 February 1930	Sunk 8 June 1940
Acavus	Royal Navy	Rapana	merchant aircraft carrier	8,010	October 1943	Returned to merchant service post-war
Achates	Royal Navy	A	destroyer	1,350	27 March 1930	Sunk 31 December 1942
Acheron	Royal Navy	A	destroyer	1,350	13 October 1931	Sunk 17 December 1940
Achilles	Royal NavyRoyal New Zealand Navy	Leander	light cruiser	7,270	6 October 1933	Sold to India 1948
Aconit	French Navy	Flower	corvette	925	23 July 1941	30 April 1947
Acree	United States Navy	Cannon	destroyer escort	1,240	19 July 1943	Decommissioned 1946, scrapped 1973
Action	United States Navy	Flower modified	corvette	1,015	22 November 1942	6 September 1945
Active	Royal Navy	A	destroyer	1,350	9 February 1930	Scrapped 1947
Adams	United States Navy	Robert H. Smith	minelayer destroyer	2,200	10 October 1944	Decommissioned 1947, scrapped 1971
Adelaide	Royal Australian Navy	Birmingham	light cruiser	5,550	5 August 1922	Scrapped 1949
Admiral Graf Spee	Kriegsmarine	Deutschland	cruiser	12,103	6 January 1936	scuttled 17 December 1939
Admiral Hipper	Kriegsmarine	Admiral Hipper	heavy cruiser	14,000	25 April 1939	Scuttled 2 May 1945
Admiral Scheer	Kriegsmarine	Deutschland	cruiser	12,100	12 November 1934	Sunk 9 April 1945
Admiralty Islands	United States Navy	Casablanca	escort carrier	7,800	13 June 1944	Scrapped 1947
Adrias	Hellenic Navy	Hunt	destroyer escort	1,050	5 August 1942	Damaged by mine 22 October 1943, scrapped 1945
Adventure	Royal Navy		minelayer cruiser	6,850	4 November 1916	Landing repair ship 1944; scrapped 1947
Adula	Royal Navy	Rapana	merchant aircraft carrier	16,000	February 1944	Returned to merchant service post-war
Aetos	Hellenic Navy	Aetos	destroyer	1,030	19 October 1912	Decommissioned 1946
Afridi	Royal Navy	Tribal	destroyer	2,020	3 May 1938	Sunk 3 May 1940
Agano	Imperial Japanese Navy	Agano	light cruiser	6,650	31 October 1942	Sunk 15 February 1944
Agassiz	Royal Canadian Navy	Flower	corvette	925	23 January 1941	Paid off 14 June 1945
Agra	Royal Indian Navy	Basset	minesweeper	529	1941–1944	1941–1944
Ahmedabad	Royal Indian Navy	Basset	minesweeper	529	1941–1944	1941–1944
Ahrens	United States Navy	Buckley	destroyer escort	1,400	12 February 1944	Decommissioned 1946, scrapped 1967
Airedale	Royal Navy	Hunt	destroyer escort	1,050		Sunk June 1942
Ajax	Royal Navy	Leander	light cruiser	7,220	3 June 1935	Scrapped 1949
Akagi	Imperial Japanese Navy	Amagi	aircraft carrier	36,500	27 March 1927	Sunk 5 June 1942
Akitsu Maru	Imperial Japanese Army	Type C	landing craft carrier escort carrier	11,800	30 January 1942	sunk 15 November 1944
Akizuki	Imperial Japanese Navy	Akizuki	destroyer	2,700	11 June 1942	Sunk 25 October 1944
Alabama	United States Navy	South Dakota	battleship	35,000	16 August 1942	Decommissioned 9 January 1947, museum ship
Alacrity	United States Navy	Flower modified	corvette	1,015	10 December 1942	4 October 1945
Alaska	United States Navy	Alaska	battlecruiser ("large cruiser")	27,500	17 June 1944	Scrapped 1960
Albatross	Royal Navy		seaplane carrier	6,350	29 September 1938	Torpedoed 1944, not repaired, scrapped 1954
Albatros	Kriegsmarine	1923 Raubvogel-class	torpedo boat	1,290	5 May 1927	Beached 10 April 1940
Alberico da Barbiano	Regia Marina	Condottieri	light cruiser	5,200	9 June 1931	Sunk 13 December 1941
Alberni	Royal Canadian Navy	Flower	corvette	925	4 February 1941	Sunk on 21 August 1944 by U-480
Albert T. Harris	United States Navy	John C. Butler	destroyer escort	1,350	29 November 1944	Sunk as target 1969
Albert W. Grant	United States Navy	Fletcher	destroyer	2,050	24 November 1943	Decommissioned 1971, scrapped 1972
Alberto di Giussano	Regia Marina	Condottieri	light cruiser	5,200	1 January 1931	Sunk 13 December 1941
Albrighton	Royal Navy	Hunt	destroyer escort	1,050	22 February 1942	Paid off 6 January 1956
Alcantara	Royal Navy		Armed merchant cruiser	22,181	1927	Scrapped 1958
Aldea	Chilean Navy	Serrano	destroyer	1,090	26 July 1929	Discarded 1957
Alden	United States Navy	Clemson	destroyer	1,250	24 November 1919	Scrapped 30 November 1945
Aldenham	Royal Navy	Hunt	destroyer escort	1,050	5 February 1942	Sunk 14 December 1944
Alexander J. Luke	United States Navy	Buckley	destroyer escort	1,400	19 February 1944	Decommissioned 1947, sunk as target 1970
Alexia	Royal Navy	Rapana	merchant aircraft carrier	8,010	1 December 1943	Returned to merchant service post-war
Alfred A. Cunningham	United States Navy	Allen M. Sumner	destroyer	2,200	23 November 1944	Decommissioned 1971, sunk as target 1979
Alger	United States Navy; Brazilian Navy	Cannon	destroyer escort	1,240	12 November 1943	To Brazil 10 March 1945 as Babitonga, scrapped 1964
Algérie	French Navy		heavy cruiser	10,000	15 September 1934	scuttled 27 November 1942
Algérien	Free French Naval Forces	Cannon	destroyer escort	1,240	23 January 1944	To France after war, scrapped November 1965
Algoma	Royal Canadian Navy	Flower	corvette	925	11 July 1941	paid off 6 July 1945
Algonquin	Royal Canadian Navy	V	destroyer	2,700	28 February 1944	paid off 1 April 1970
Alisma	Royal Navy	Flower	corvette	925	13 February 1941	
Allen M. Sumner	United States Navy	Allen M. Sumner	destroyer	2,200	26 January 1944	Scrapped 1974
Almirante Brown	Argentine Navy	Veinticinco de Mayo	heavy cruiser	6,800	18 July 1931	scrapped 1962
Almirante Condell	Chilean Navy	Almirante Lynch	destroyer	1,430	January 1914	Decommissioned 1945
Almirante Latorre	Chilean Navy	Almirante Latorre	super dreadnought	28,550	1 August 1920	Scrapped 1959
Almirante Lynch	Chilean Navy	Almirante Lynch	destroyer	1,430	1913	Decommissioned 1945
Almirante Simpson	Chilean Navy	Capitan O'Brien	submarine	2,020	1929	Discarded 1957
Altamaha	United States Navy	Bogue	escort carrier	7,900	15 September 1942	Scrapped 1946
Alvin C. Cockrell	United States Navy	John C. Butler	destroyer escort	1,350	7 October 1944	Sunk as target 1969
Alysse	French Navy	Flower	corvette	925	17 June 1941	9 February 1942
Amagi	Imperial Japanese Navy	Unryū	aircraft carrier	17,150	10 August 1944	Sunk 27 July 1945
Amaranthus	Royal Navy	Flower	corvette	925	12 February 1941	
Amastra	Royal Navy	Rapana	merchant aircraft carrier	16,000	1 September 1943	
Amazon	Royal Navy	prototype	destroyer	1,350	5 May 1927	Scrapped 25 October 1948
Ambuscade	Royal Navy	prototype	destroyer	1,173	15 March 1927	Scrapped 1946
Ameer	Royal Navy	Ruler	escort carrier	11,400	20 July 1943	paid off 20 March 1946, scrapped 1969
Amesbury	United States Navy	Buckley	destroyer escort	1,400	31 August 1943	sold for scrap, sank under tow 1962
Amethyst	Royal Navy	Black Swan	Sloop	1,350	2 November 1943	Scrapped 19 January 1957
Amherst	Royal Canadian Navy	Flower	corvette	925	5 August 1941	paid off 16 July 1945
Amick	United States Navy	Cannon	destroyer escort	1,240	26 July 1943	To Japan 1955, to Philippines 1976, scrapped 1989
Amiral Murgescu	Romanian Naval Forces; Soviet Navy	Amiral Murgescu	minelayer	812	14 June 1939	To Romania 1939, to Soviet Union 1944, scrapped 1989
Ammen	United States Navy	Fletcher	destroyer	2,050	12 March 1943	Scrapped 1960
Amritsar	Royal Indian Navy	Basset	minesweeper	529	1941–1944	1941–1944
Amsterdam	United States Navy	Cleveland	light cruiser	11,800	8 January 1945	Scrapped 1971
Anacapa	United States Navy		Q-ship	7,500	31 August 1942	21 March 1946
Anchusa	Royal Navy	Flower	corvette	925	1 March 1941	
Ancylus	Royal Navy	Rapana	merchant aircraft carrier	16,000	October 1943	
Andenes	Royal Norwegian Navy	Flower	corvette	925	1 October 1941	
Anderson	United States Navy	Sims	destroyer	1,570	19 May 1939	Sunk in nuclear bomb test 1946
Andrea Doria	Regia Marina	Andrea Doria	battleship	25,920	13 March 1916	Scrapped 1956
Andres	United States Navy	Evarts	destroyer escort	1,140	15 March 1943	Scrapped 1946
Anemone	Royal Navy	Flower	corvette	925	12 August 1940	
Annan	Royal Canadian Navy	River	frigate	1,445	13 January 1944	paid off 20 June 1945
Annapolis	Royal Canadian Navy	Town	destroyer	1,190	24 September 1940	paid off 4 June 1945
Anson	Royal Navy	King George V	battleship	35,000	22 June 1942	Scrapped 1957
Antelope	Royal Navy	A	destroyer	1,350	20 March 1930	Scrapped 1946
Anthony (H40)	Royal Navy	A	destroyer	1,350	14 February 1930	Scrapped 1948
Anthony (DD-515)	United States Navy	Fletcher	destroyer	2,050	26 February 1943	To West Germany 1958, sunk as target 1979
Antietam	United States Navy	Essex	aircraft carrier	30,800	28 January 1945	Decommissioned 8 May 1963, scrapped 1974
Antigonish	Royal Canadian Navy	River	frigate	1,445	4 July 1944	paid off 30 November 1966
Antiquois	Colombian National Navy	Guadiana	destroyer	1,219		former Douro (Portugal)
Antoine	Royal Navy		Special Service Ship	1,030		paid off March 1941
Aoba	Imperial Japanese Navy	Aoba	heavy cruiser	5,088	20 September 1927	Sunk 28 July 1945
Apollo	Royal Navy	Abdiel	minelayer	2,650	9 October 1943	Scrapped 1962
Aquila	Regia Marina		aircraft carrier	23,500	not completed	Scrapped 1952
Arabis (I)	Royal Navy; United States Navy	Flower	corvette	925	5 April 1940	to US 30 April 1942, to UK 26 August 1945
Arabis (II)	Royal New Zealand Navy	Flower modified	corvette	1,015	16 March 1944	paid off 1948
Äran	Swedish Navy	Äran	coastal defence ship	3,650	7 September 1902	paid off 16 June 1947, scrapped 1961
Arbiter	Royal Navy	Ruler	escort carrier	7,800	31 December 1943	paid off 12 April 1946, scrapped 1972
Arbutus (I)	Royal Navy	Flower	corvette	925	12 October 1940	sunk on 5 February 1942 by U-136
Arbutus (II)	Royal New Zealand Navy	Flower modified	corvette	1,015	5 July 1944	paid off 1948
Archer	Royal Navy	Avenger	escort carrier	8,200	17 November 1941	paid off 6 November 1943, scrapped 1962
Arcona	Kriegsmarine		Floating anti-aircraft battery	2,657	18 May 1901	Scrapped 1948/1949
Ardent	Royal Navy	A	destroyer	1,350	14 April 1930	Sunk 8 June 1940
Argus	Royal Navy		aircraft carrier	14,860	September 1918	Scrapped 1946
Ariadne	Royal Navy	Abdiel	minelayer	2,650	12 February 1944	Scrapped 1965
Ariguani	Royal Navy		fighter catapult ship		1940	1943
Arizona	United States Navy	Pennsylvania	super dreadnought	32,600	17 October 1916	Sunk 7 December 1941, war memorial
Arkansas	United States Navy	Wyoming	battleship	26,100	17 September 1912	Sunk 25 July 1946 in A-bomb test
Ark Royal	Royal Navy		aircraft carrier	22,000	16 December 1938	Sunk 14 November 1941
Armada	Royal Navy	Battle	destroyer	2,325	2 July 1945	paid off 1960, scrapped 1965
Armando Diaz	Regia Marina	Condottieri	light cruiser	5,316	29 April 1933	Sunk 25 February 1941
Armeria	Royal Navy	Flower	corvette	925	28 March 1941	
Arrow	Royal Navy	A	destroyer	1,350	14 April 1930	Irreparably damaged, 1944
Arrowhead	Royal Navy; Royal Canadian Navy	Flower	corvette	925	22 November 1940	to Canada 15 May 1941, paid off 27 June 1945
Arteveld	Belgian Navy		patrol boat	1,640		Commissioned as Lorelei (Germany)
Arunta	Royal Australian Navy	Tribal	destroyer	2,020	30 March 1942	Scrapped 1968
Arvida	Royal Canadian Navy	Flower	corvette	925	22 May 1941	paid off 14 June 1945
Asbestos	Royal Canadian Navy	Flower modified	corvette	1,015	16 June 1944	8 July 1945
Ashanti	Royal Navy	Tribal	destroyer	2,020	21 December 1938	Scrapped 1949
Ashigara	Imperial Japanese Navy	Myōkō	heavy cruiser	13,300	20 August 1929	Sunk 8 June 1945
Ashland	United States Navy	Ashland	Dock landing ship	7,930	5 June 1943	Stricken 25 November 1969
Asphodel	Royal Navy	Flower	corvette	925	11 September 1940	sunk 10 March 1944 by U-575
Assam	Royal Indian Navy	Flower modified	corvette	1,015	19 February 1945	paid off 1947
Assiniboine	Royal Canadian Navy	C	destroyer	1,390	30 May 1932	transferred to RCN 19 October 1939, paid off 8 August 1945
Aster	Royal Navy	Flower	corvette	925	9 April 1941	
Asterion	United States Navy		Q-ship	6,610	March 1942	transferred to Coast Guard 16 December 1943 converted to weather ship
Astoria (CA-34)	United States Navy	New Orleans	heavy cruiser	9,950	28 April 1934	Sunk 9 August 1942 Battle of Savo Island
Astoria (CL-90)	United States Navy	Cleveland	light cruiser	11,800	17 May 1944	Scrapped 1971
Atago	Imperial Japanese Navy	Takao	heavy cruiser	14,616	30 March 1932	Sunk 23 October 1944
Athabaskan	Royal Canadian Navy	Tribal	destroyer	2,020	3 February 1943	Sunk 29 April 1944
Atheling	Royal Navy	Ruler	escort carrier	7,800	28 October 1943	paid off 6 December 1946, scrapped 1967
Atherstone	Royal Navy	Hunt	destroyer escort	1,000	23 March 1940	paid off 23 September 1945, scrapped 1957
Atherton	United States Navy	Cannon	destroyer escort	1,240	29 August 1943	To Japan 1955, to Philippines 1976, active as of 2012
Atholl	Royal Canadian Navy	Flower modified	corvette	1,015	14 October 1943	17 July 1945
Atik	United States Navy		Q-ship	6,610	5 March 1942	sunk 26 March 1942
Atlanta (CL-51)	United States Navy	Atlanta	light cruiser	6,000	24 December 1941	Sunk 13 November 1942 Guadalcanal
Atlanta (CL-104)	United States Navy	Cleveland	light cruiser	11,800	3 December 1944	Sunk as target 1970
Atlantis	Kriegsmarine		auxiliary cruiser	7,862	19 December 1939	Sunk 21 November 1941
Attacker	Royal Navy	Attacker	escort carrier	11,400	30 September 1942	paid off 5 January 1946, scrapped 24 May 1980
Attilio Regolo	Regia Marina	Capitani Romani	light cruiser	3,750	August 1942	ceded to France 1948
Attu	United States Navy	Casablanca	escort carrier	7,800	30 June 1944	Scrapped 1947
Aubrietia	Royal Navy	Flower	corvette	925	23 December 1940	
Augusta	United States Navy	Northampton	heavy cruiser	9,200	30 January 1931	Scrapped 1960
Aulick	United States Navy	Fletcher	destroyer	2,050	27 October 1942	To Greece 1959, scrapped 1997
Ault	United States Navy	Allen M. Sumner	destroyer	2,200	31 May 1944	Scrapped 1974
Auricula	Royal Navy	Flower	corvette	925	5 March 1941	6 May 1942
Aurora	Soviet Navy		Protected cruiser	6,731	29 July 1903	In 1957 became a museum ship.
Austin	United States Navy	Evarts	destroyer escort	1,140	13 February 1943	Scrapped 1947
Australia	Royal Australian Navy	County	heavy cruiser	9,850	24 April 1928	Scrapped 1955
Avenger	Royal Navy	Avenger	escort carrier	8,200	2 March 1942	Sunk 15 November 1942
Avon Vale	Royal Navy	Hunt	destroyer escort	1,050	17 February 1941	scrapped 1958
Ayanami	Imperial Japanese Navy	Fubuki	destroyer	2,090	30 April 1930	Sunk 15 November 1942
Aylwin	United States Navy	Farragut	destroyer	1,365	1 March 1935	Scrapped 1947
Azalea	Royal Navy	Flower	corvette	925	27 January 1941	
