= List of mine warfare vessels of World War II =

This is a list of mine warfare vessels of World War II.

The List of ships of World War II contains major military vessels of the war, arranged alphabetically and by type. The list includes armed vessels that served during the war and in the immediate aftermath, inclusive of localized ongoing combat operations, garrison surrenders, post-surrender occupation, colony re-occupation, troop and prisoner repatriation, to the end of 1945.

For smaller vessels, see also List of World War II ships of less than 1000 tons. Some uncompleted Axis ships are included, out of historic interest. Ships are designated to the country under which they operated for the longest period of the World War II, regardless of where they were built or their previous service history.

List of mine warfare vessels of World War II
Ship	Country	Class	Type	Displacement (tons)	First commissioned	Fate
Aaron Ward	United States Navy	Smith	destroyer minelayer	2,200	28 October 1944	constructive loss 30 April 1945, scrapped 1946
Abdiel	Royal Navy	Abdiel	minelayer cruiser	2,650	15 April 1941	Sunk 10 September 1943
Adams	United States Navy	Smith	destroyer minelayer	2,200	10 October 1944	Decommissioned 1947, scrapped 1971
Adventure	Royal Navy		minelayer cruiser	6,850	4 November 1916	landing repair ship 1944; scrapped 1947
Agra	Royal Indian Navy	Basset	minesweeper	529	15 April 1942	Decommissioned 1946
Ahmedabad	Royal Indian Navy	Basset	minesweeper	529	4 September 1944	Sold April 1947
Amiral Murgescu	Royal Romanian Navy; Soviet Navy	Amiral Murgescu	destroyer minelayer	1,068	1941	To Soviet Union 1944, scrapped 1988
Amritsar	Royal Indian Navy	Basset	minesweeper	529	20 November 1942	Decommissioned 1947
Apollo	Royal Navy	Abdiel	minelayer cruiser	2,650	9 October 1943	Scrapped 1962
Ariadne	Royal Navy	Abdiel	minelayer cruiser	2,650	12 February 1944	Scrapped 1965
Baroda	Royal Indian Navy	Basset	minesweeper	529	December 1942	Transferred to Pakistan 1948
Berar	Royal Indian Navy	Basset	minesweeper	529	October 1942	Decommissioned 1946
Boggs	United States Navy	Wickes	minesweeper destroyer	1,190	23 September 1918	scrapped 1946
Brandenburg	Kriegsmarine		minelayer	3,894	1 May 1943	captured French transport Kita, sunk 21 September 1943
Breese	United States Navy	Wickes	destroyer minelayer	1,190	23 October 1918	scrapped May 1946
Brummer	Kriegsmarine		minelayer	1,924	9 April 1940	Captured from Norway 9 April 1940, sunk May 1945
Calcutta	Royal Indian Navy	Basset	minesweeper	529	18 August 1944	Decommissioned 1947
Chandler	United States Navy	Clemson	minesweeper destroyer	1,200	5 September 1919	scrapped 1946
Clive	Royal Indian Navy	24	minesweeper sloop	1,748	20 April 1920	Scrapped 1947
Cochin	Royal Indian Navy	Basset	minesweeper	529	9 April 1946	Decommissioned 1950
Cuttack	Royal Indian Navy	Basset	minesweeper	529	21 August 1944	Decommissioned 1946
Drache	Kriegsmarine		minelayer	1,870	17 April 1941	captured from Yugoslav, Zmaj, sunk 22 September 1944
Gamble	United States Navy	Wickes	destroyer minelayer	1,090	29 November 1918	Damaged 17 February 1945, scuttled 16 July 1945.
Gryf	Poland	Gryf	minelayer	2,085	27 February 1938	sunk 3 September 1939
Icarus	Royal Navy	I	destroyer minelayer	1,370	3 May 1937	paid off 29 August 1946, scrapped 29 October 1946.
Ilex	Royal Navy	I	destroyer minelayer	1,370	7 July 1937	paid off August, scrapped in Sicily 1948.
Imogen	Royal Navy	I	destroyer minelayer	1,370	2 June 1937	sunk in collision 16 July 1940
Imperial	Royal Navy	I	destroyer minelayer	1,370	30 June 1937	sunk 29 May 1941
Impulsive	Royal Navy	I	destroyer minelayer	1,370	29 January 1938	paid off 1946, scrapped 22 January 1946.
Inglefield	Royal Navy	I	destroyer minelayer	1,370	25 June 1937	sunk 25 February 1944
Intrepid	Royal Navy	I	destroyer minelayer	1,370	29 July 1937	sunk 26 September 1943
Isis	Royal Navy	I	destroyer minelayer	1,370	2 June 1937	sunk 20 July 1944.
Ivanhoe	Royal Navy	I	destroyer minelayer	1,370	24 August 1937	sunk 1 September 1940
J-826	Royal Navy	BYMS	minesweeper	360	February 1943	Post-war oceanographic research vessel RV Calypso
Karachi	Royal Indian Navy	Basset	minesweeper	529	21 December 1942	Decommissioned 1946
Lahore	Royal Indian Navy	Basset	minesweeper	529	17 November 1942	Decommissioned 1946
Lamberton	United States Navy	Wickes	minesweeper destroyer	1,090	22 August 1918	scrapped 9 May 1947
Latona	Royal Navy	Abdiel	minelayer cruiser	2,650	4 May 1941	lost 25 October 1941
Lawrence	Royal Indian Navy	24	minesweeper sloop	1,748	27 December 1919	Scrapped 1947
Lothringen	Kriegsmarine		minelayer cruiser	1,975	December 1941	sold to merchant service post-war
Lucknow	Royal Indian Navy	Basset	minesweeper	529	April 1946	Decommissioned 1946
Madura	Royal Indian Navy	Basset	minesweeper	529	27 May 1943	Decommissioned 1946
Manxman	Royal Navy	Abdiel	minelayer cruiser	2,650	20 June 1941	scrapped 1971
Multan	Royal Indian Navy	Basset	minesweeper	529	1941–1944	1941–1944
Nagpur	Royal Indian Navy	Basset	minesweeper	529	1941–1944	1941–1944
Nasik	Royal Indian Navy	Basset	minesweeper	529	24 May 1944	Decommissioned 1950
Oribi	Royal Navy	O	destroyer minelayer	1,540	3 September 1942	paid off 1948, scrapped 1965
Obedient	Royal Navy	O	destroyer minelayer	1,540	30 October 1942	paid off 1957, scrapped 1962
Okinoshima	Imperial Japanese Navy		minelayer	4,290	30 September 1936	sunk 12 May 1942
Oldenburg	Kriegsmarine		minelayer	1,141	13 September 1943	captured Italian water tanker Garigiliano
Opportune	Royal Navy	O	destroyer minelayer	1,540	14 August 1942	paid off 1954, scrapped 1955
Orwell	Royal Navy	O	destroyer minelayer	1,540	17 October 1942	
Patna	Royal Indian Navy	Basset	minesweeper	529	24 January 1943	Decommissioned 1946
Peshawar	Royal Indian Navy	Basset	minesweeper	529		Cancelled September 1945
Poona	Royal Indian Navy	Basset	minesweeper	529	24 December 1942	Decommissioned 1946
Quetta	Royal Indian Navy	Basset	minesweeper	529		Cancelled February 1945
Rampur	Royal Indian Navy	Basset	minesweeper	529	17 October 1945	Transferred to Pakistan 1948
Ramsay	United States Navy	Wickes	destroyer minelayer	1,090	15 February 1919	Decommissioned 19 October 1945, scrapped 1947
Shillong	Royal Indian Navy	Basset	minesweeper	529	27 March 1943	
Skate	Royal Navy	R (Admiralty)	destroyer minelayer	991	19 February 1917	scrapped 1947
Tannenberg	Kriegsmarine		minelayer	1,098	2 September 1939	former ferry; sunk 9 July 1941
Travancore	Royal Indian Navy	Basset	minesweeper	529	January 1942	Decommissioned in 1947
Welshman	Royal Navy	Abdiel	minelayer cruiser	2,650	25 August 1941	sunk 1 February 1943
