= Bullmastiff =

English breed of dog

Bullmastiff Dog
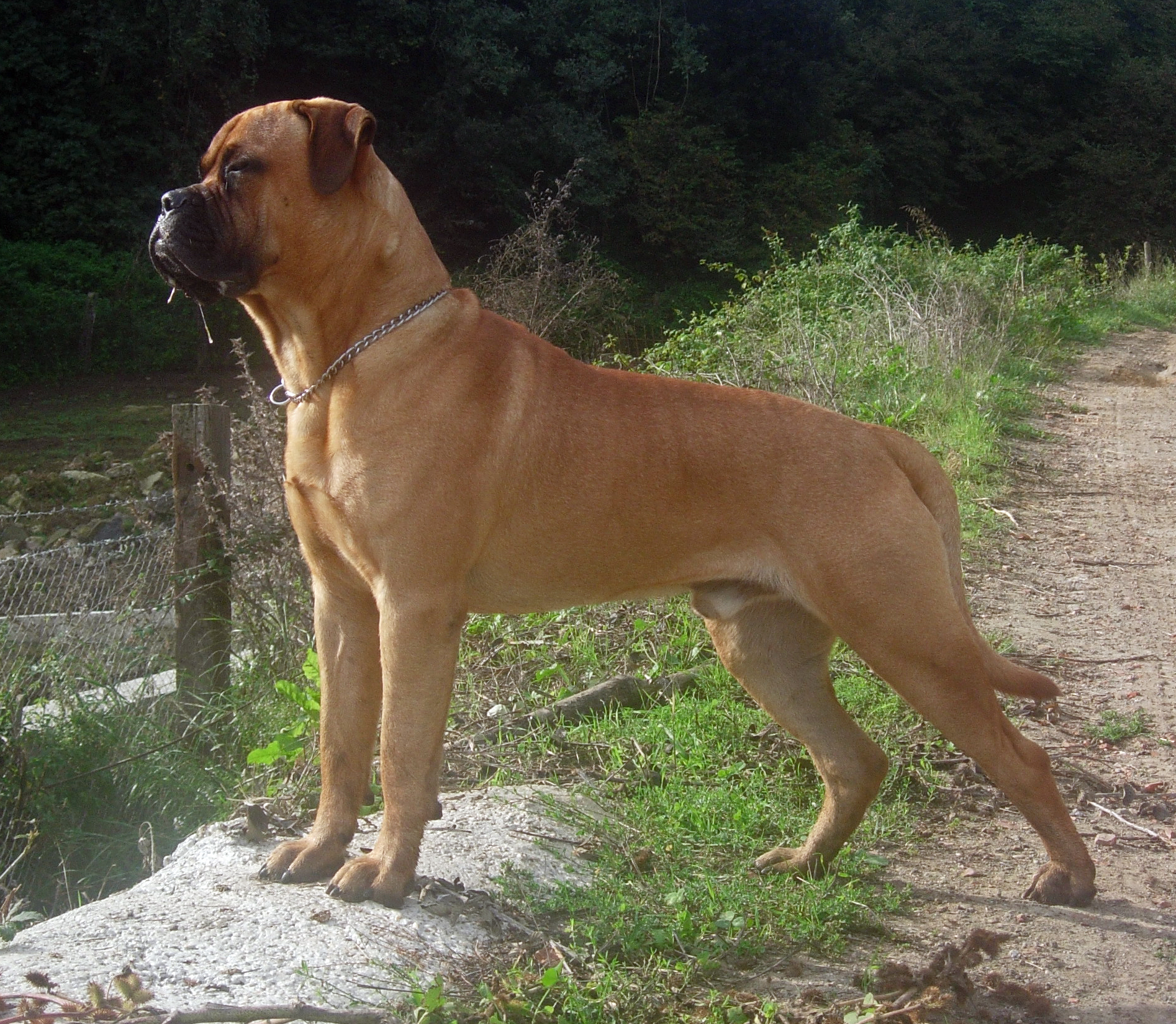
- Origin: England
Traits
| Height | Males | 64–69 cm (25–27 in) |
| | Females | 61–66 cm (24–26 in) |
| Weight | Males | 50–59 kg (110–130 lb) |
| | Females | 41–50 kg (90–110 lb) |
- Coat: Short and weather resistant
- Colour: Any shade of brindle; red; fawn
Kennel club standards
- The Kennel Club: standard
- Fédération Cynologique Internationale: standard

The Bullmastiff is an English breed of dog of mastiff type and large size, with a solid build and a short muzzle. It was developed as a guard dog in the nineteenth century by cross-breeding the English Mastiff with the now-extinct Old English Bulldog. It was recognised as a breed by The Kennel Club in 1924.

== History ==
The origins of the Bullmastiff are unclear. In the 18th century, in some regions of England, the English Mastiff and Old English Bulldog were commonly inter-bred to produce dogs suitable for guarding people and their property. By the beginning of the 20th century, this cross-breed was in widespread use as an aid to gamekeepers in the control of poaching. They were bred for strength, size and speed using a cross of the tough, heavy and aggressive 19th century bulldog with the large, strong, less aggressive mastiff. As a result, the Bullmastiff is known as the Gamekeeper's Night Dog.

The Bullmastiff was recognised as a breed by The Kennel Club in 1924. Dogs had to have a minimum of four generations of descent from Bullmastiff stock without input from either Bulldog or Mastiff; cross-bred animals could not be registered. The American Kennel Club recognised it in 1934.
It was definitively accepted by the Fédération Cynologique Internationale in 1955.

In 1928, the De Beers diamond mining company imported Bullmastiffs to South Africa to guard the mines.

== Appearance ==
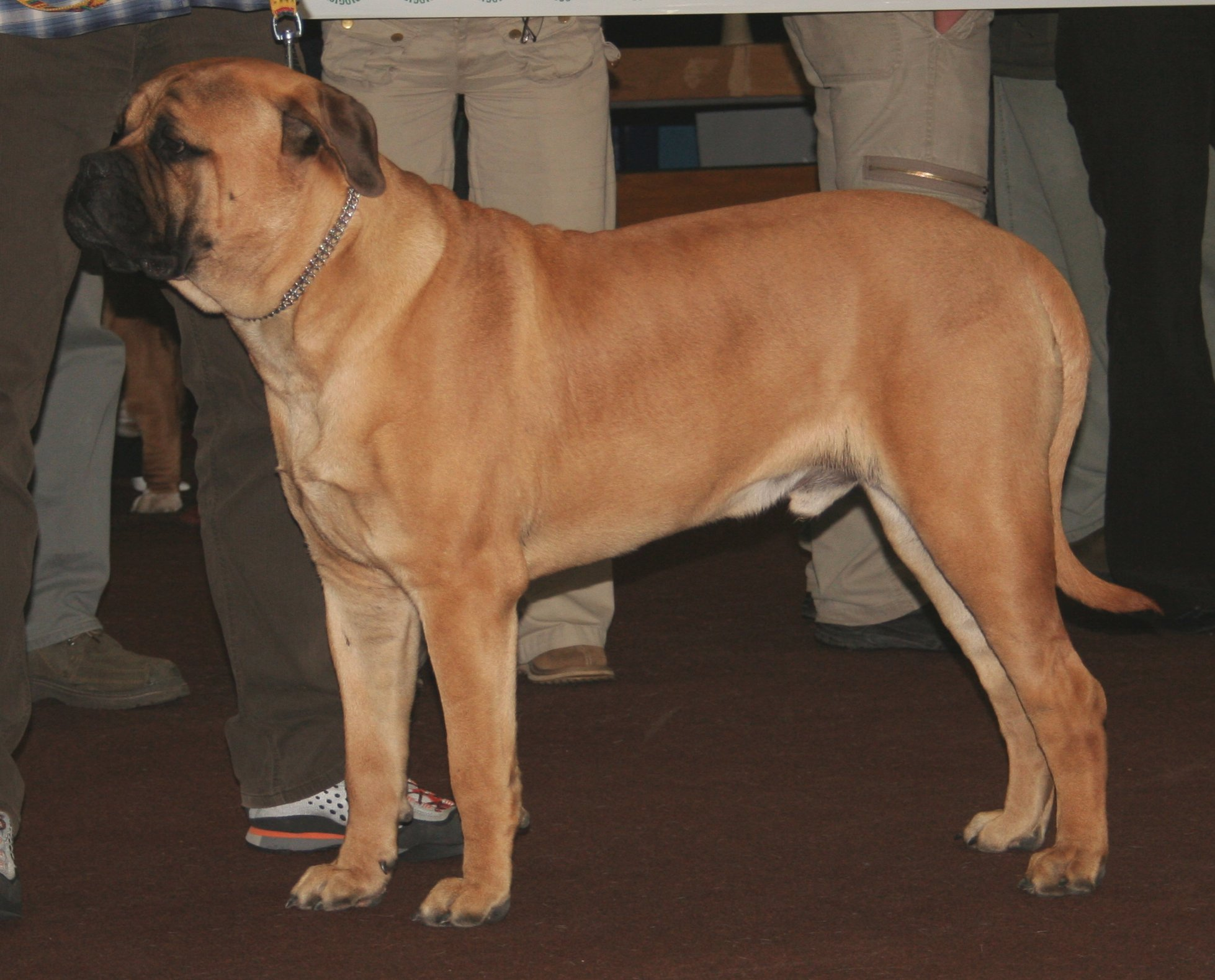
A male, fawn Bullmastiff

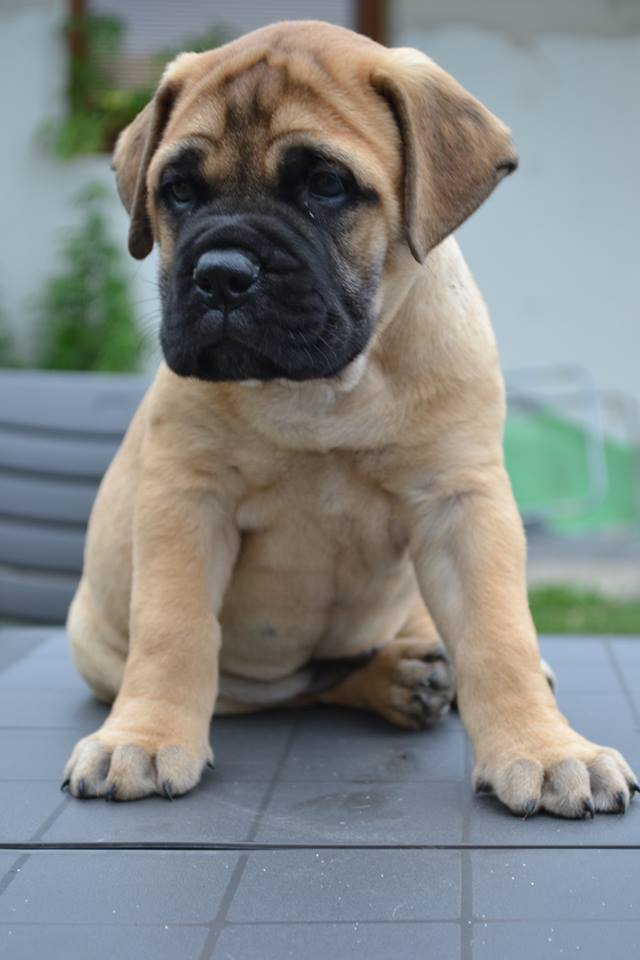
Puppy

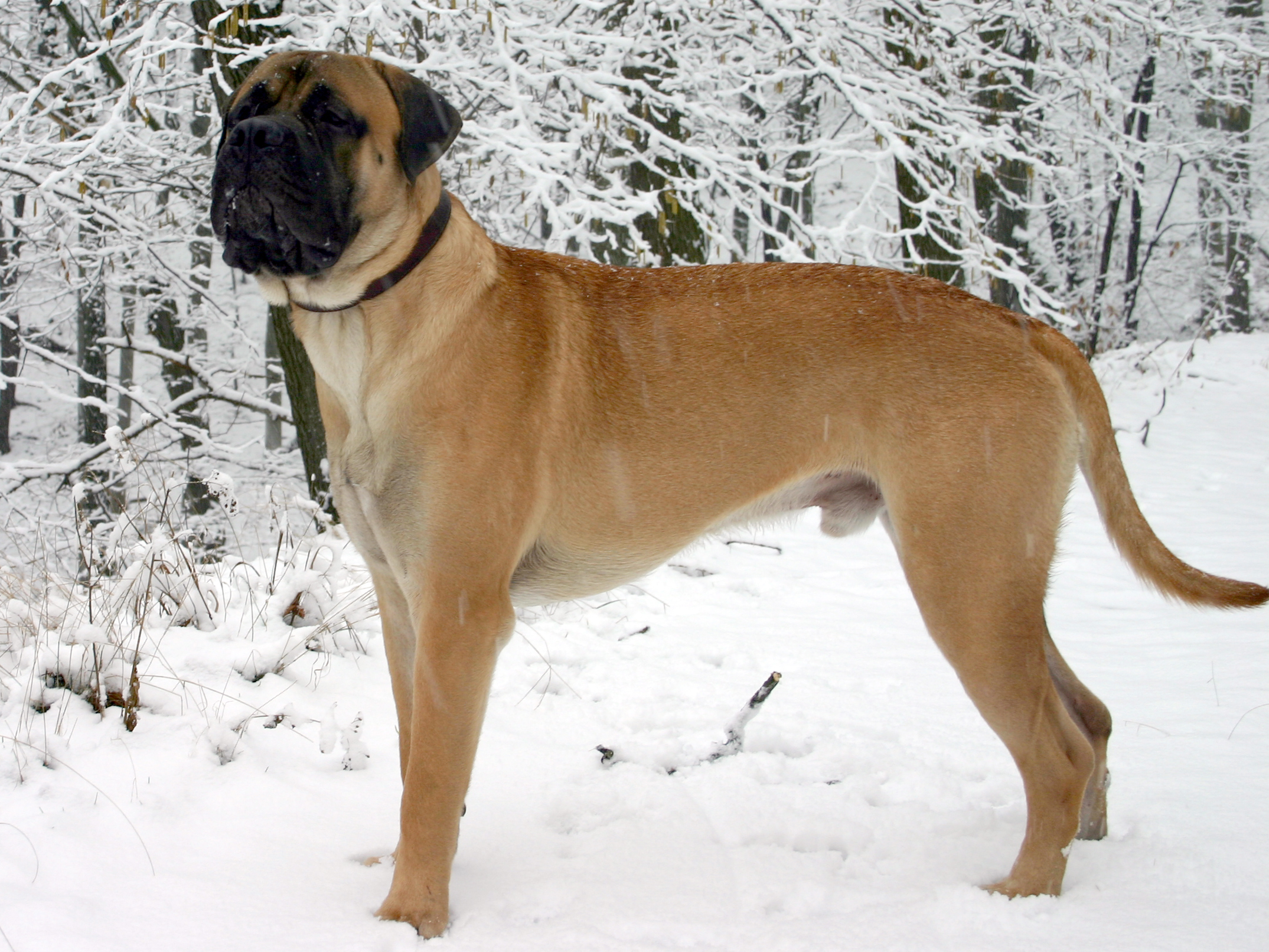
Young Bullmastiff male standing in the snow

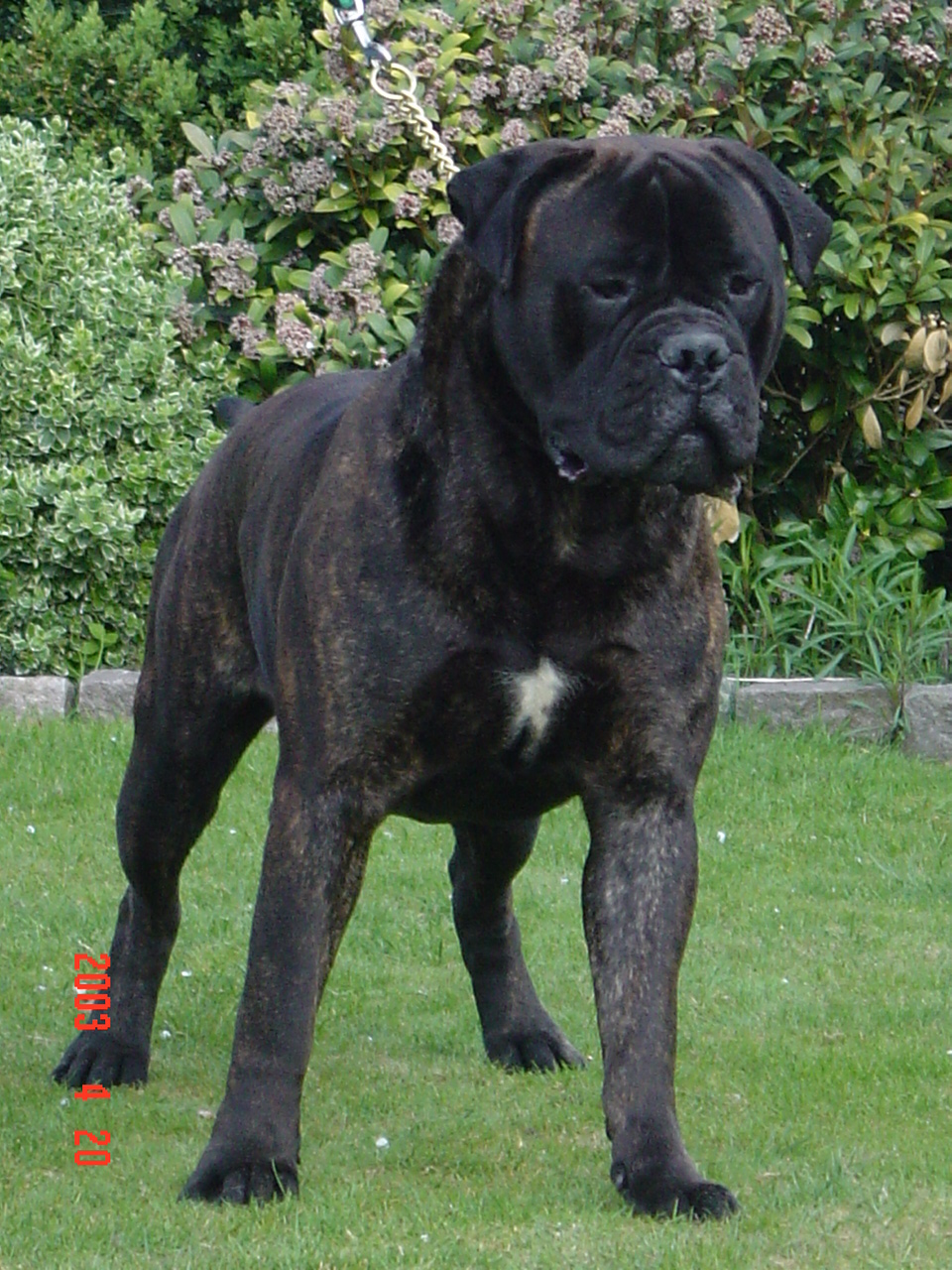
Brindle Bullmastiff

The Bullmastiff is a large dog. Bitches stand some 61–66 cm at the withers, and usually weigh 41–50 kg; on average, dogs stand about 3 cm taller and weigh 9 kg more.

The coat may be fawn, red, or brindle, in any shade; some limited white marking on the chest is allowed. The muzzle is black, becoming paler towards the eyes.

The Bullmastiff is brachycephalic, flat-faced and short-muzzled, but this does not affect its breathing.

== Health ==
A 2024 UK study found a life expectancy of 10.2 years for the breed compared to an average of 12.7 for purebreeds and 12 for crossbreeds.

Health concerns within the breed include hip and elbow dysplasia, progressive retinal atrophy, bloat, and cancer, with a relatively high incidence of lymphoma and mast cell tumours. Bullmastiffs are prone to certain hereditary diseases, including:

- Hip dysplasia, affecting 24.5% of individuals
- Elbow dysplasia, affecting 13.8% of individuals,
- Entropion, hypothyroidism affecting 2.8% of individuals,
- Lymphoma

An autosomal dominant form of progressive retinal atrophy is common in the breed. A mutation to the RHO gene is responsible.

Bullmastiffs also are prone to ear infections.

== See also ==
- List of dog breeds
- Mastiff (disambiguation)
- See Spot Run
