= Asbestos (disambiguation) =

Asbestos is a carcinogenic fibrous mineral with several applications such as a flame retardant.

It may also refer to:

== Places ==
- Asbestos, Maryland, former name for an unincorporated area
- Val-des-Sources, a city in Quebec known as Asbestos until 2020
  - The former Asbestos Regional County Municipality, Quebec, now renamed Les Sources Regional County Municipality
- Asbestos Range National Park, Tasmania, Australia, is now the Narawntapu National Park
- Port Asbestos (fictional), a fictional location on the Red Green show
- Asbest, town in Russia

== Other ==
- Asbestos-ceramic, types of Scandinavian pottery c. 1900 BC – 200 AD
- Asbestos Records, a record label
- HMCS Asbestos (K358), a Canadian warship
- AsbestOS, a bootloader to run on Linux on PlayStation 3
- Asbestos, a Hawthorn Leslie saddle tank locomotive
