= K71 =

K71 or K-71 may refer to:

- K-71 (Kansas highway), a state highway in Kansas
- INS Vijaydurg (K71), an Indian Navy ship
