= HMS Hound =

Fifteen ships of the Royal Navy have borne the name Hound:

- English ship Hound (1652) was a 36-gun ship captured in 1652, a hulk in 1656 and broken up in 1660.
- HMS Hound (1656) was an 18-gun ship captured in 1656 and expended as a fire ship in 1666.
- HMS Hound (1673) was a 4-gun sloop built in 1673 and sold in 1686.
- HMS Hound (1690) was an 8-gun fire ship launched in 1690 and expended in 1692.
- HMS Hound (1700) was a 4-gun sloop launched in 1700 and broken up in 1714.
- HMS Hound (1732) was a 14-gun sloop launched in 1732 and broken up in 1745.
- HMS Hound (1745) was a 14-gun sloop launched in 1745 and sold in 1773.
- HMS Hound (1776) was a 14-gun sloop launched in 1776. She was in French hands between 1780 and 1782, when she was renamed Levrette. She was recaptured and broken up in 1784.
- HMS Hound (1790) was a 16-gun sloop launched in 1790. In 1794 the French frigates Seine and Galatee captured her in the Atlantic. She became the French Navy corvette Levrette (or Levrette No.2), and was last listed in 1796.
- HMS Hound (1796) was a 16-gun brig-sloop launched in 1796 and wrecked in 1800 off Shetland, together with all her crew of 120 men and 45 Dutch prisoners of war.
- HMS Hound (1801) was a 16-gun sloop previously named Monarch. She was purchased in 1801, converted to a bomb vessel in 1808 and broken up in 1812.
- HMS Hound was to have been an 8-gun brig, ordered in 1839 from Chatham Dockyard. The order was cancelled in 1844 and transferred to Deptford Dockyard where she was completed as the next HMS Hound.
- HMS Hound (1846) was an 8-gun brig launched in 1846, used as a breakwater from 1872 and sold in 1887.
- HMS Hound was to have been an Albacore-class gunboat, but was renamed HMS Mastiff in 1855, prior to launching.
- HMS Hound (J307) was an Algerine-class minesweeper launched in 1942 and broken up in 1962.
