= HMS Mastiff =

EIght Royal Navy vessels have borne the name HMS Mastiff, named after the mastiff, a type of dog:

- HMS Mastiff (1797) was the mercantile Herald, launched at Hull in 1790 that the Royal Navy purchased in 1797 and fitted as a gun brig (12 guns); she was lost after running aground in 1800.
- HMS Mastiff (1813) was a gun brig (12 guns) launched in 1813, converted to a survey vessel in 1824 and sold 1851.
- HMS Mastiff (1855) was a mortar vessel launched in 1855 but renamed Mortar Vessel 7 later that year; transferred to HM Coastguard in 1846 and renamed Watch Vessel 37.
- HMS Mastiff (1856) was a screw gunboat launched in 1856, originally laid down as HMS Hound; sold in 1863.
- HMS Mastiff (1871) was an iron screw third-class gunboat launched in 1871. Converted to a tender in 1890, renamed HMS Snapper in 1914 and was sold in 1931.
- HMS Mastiff (1914) was a Thornycroft M-class destroyer launched in 1914 and sold in 1921.
- HMS Mastiff (1938) was a naval trawler of the Basset class launched in 1938, sunk by a mine in 1939.
- HMS Mastiff (1941), pennant FY350, was a 1929 Norwegian whaler, Busen 9, hired by the RN for the duration of the war and returned to Norway in December 1945.
