= Mastiff (disambiguation) =

A mastiff is a type of dog.

Mastiff may also refer to:

== Military ==
- HMS Mastiff, eight Royal Navy vessels serving between 1797 and 1939
- Tadiran Mastiff, a battlefield unmanned aerial vehicle (UAV) built by Tadiran Electronic Industries
- Mastiff PPV, British Army designation for the Cougar armoured fighting vehicle, with extra armour

== Arts and entertainment ==
- Mastiff (company), an American video game company
- Mastiff (novel), a 2011 fantasy novel by Tamora Pierce

== Other ==
- Mount Mastiff, a mountain in Washington, USA
