= Durg-class corvette =

Variant of the Soviet Nanuchka-class corvettes

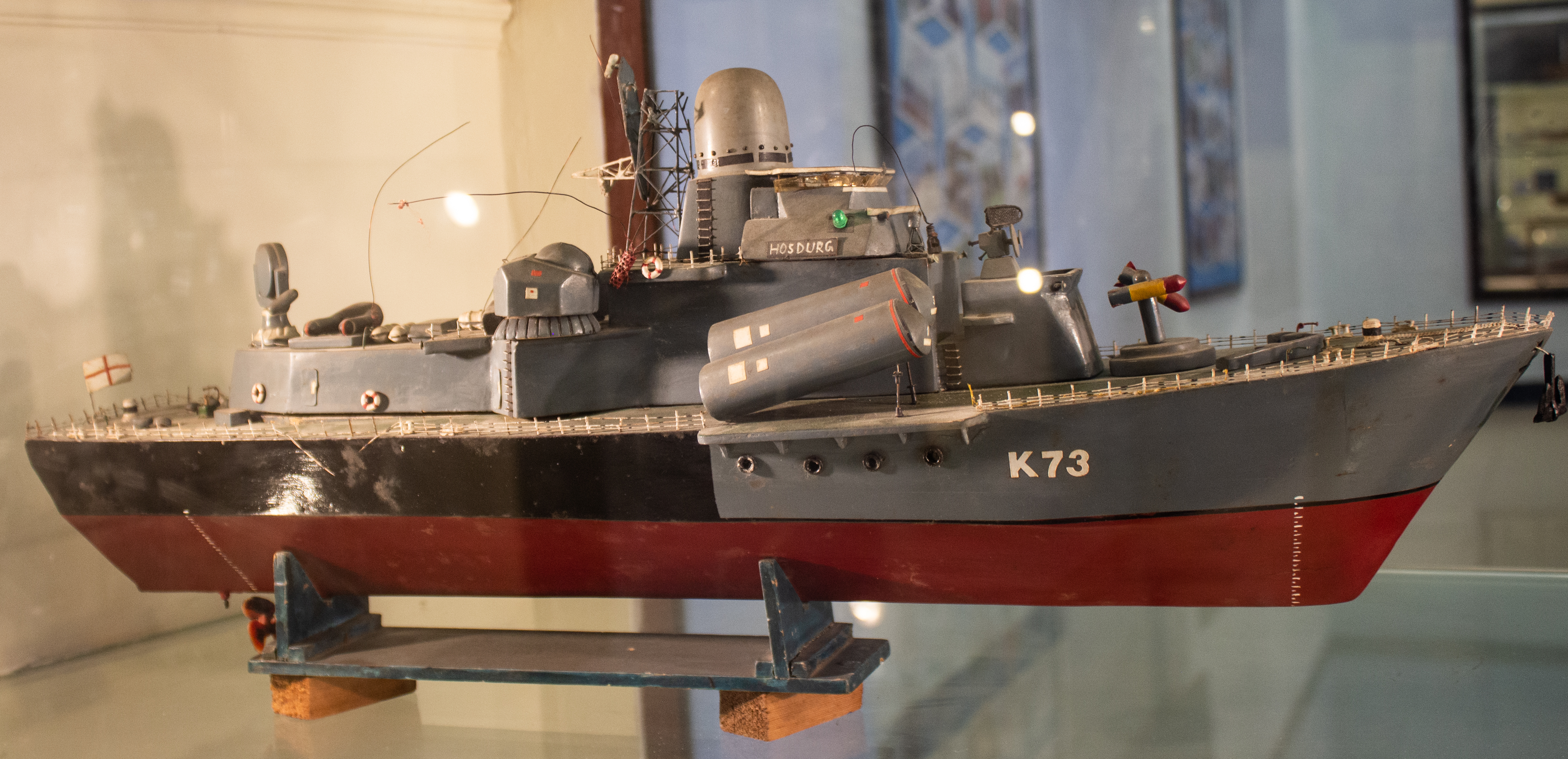
- Model of INS Hosdurg

Class overview
- Name: Durg class
- Operators: Indian Navy
- Preceded by: Arnala class
- Succeeded by: Abhay class by precedence; Veer class by role
- In commission: 1976 – 2004
- Planned: 3
- Completed: 3
- Retired: 3

General characteristics
- Type: Corvette
- Displacement: ~570t standard; 670t full load
- Length: 59 m (194 ft)
- Beam: 12.5 m (41 ft)
- Draught: 2.5 m (8 ft 2 in)
- Speed: 32 knots (59 km/h; 37 mph)
- Complement: 42 (incl 7 officers)
- Armament: 4 × P-15 (SS-N-2 'Styx') anti-ship missiles; 20 × 4K33 (SA-N-4 'Gecko') surface-to-air missiles; Twin 57mm AK-257 gun

The Durg-class corvettes of the Indian Navy were customized variants of the Soviet Navy Nanuchka-class corvettes. Three vessels of this class served in the Indian Navy, where they formed the 21st Missile Vessel Squadron (K21).

Durg-class vessels take their names from famous historical forts in India. The Durg class was primarily intended for coastal patrol and defence. They were the first class of vessels in the Indian Navy to primarily rely on surface-to-air missiles and anti-ship missiles for defence.

== Design ==
The Durg class is also known as the Nanuchka II class. Some design improvements made for the Durg class were incorporated into the Nanuchka III class, commissioned into the Soviet Navy in the 1980s.

== Ships of the class ==
Name	Pennant	Commissioned	Decommissioned	Status
INS Vijaydurg	K71	25 December 1976	30 September 2002	
INS Sindhudurg	K72	29 May 1977	24 September 2004	
INS Hosdurg	K73	15 January 1978	5 June 1999	Sunk in a Sea Eagle AShM test
