= INS Hosdurg =

Retired Indian Corvette

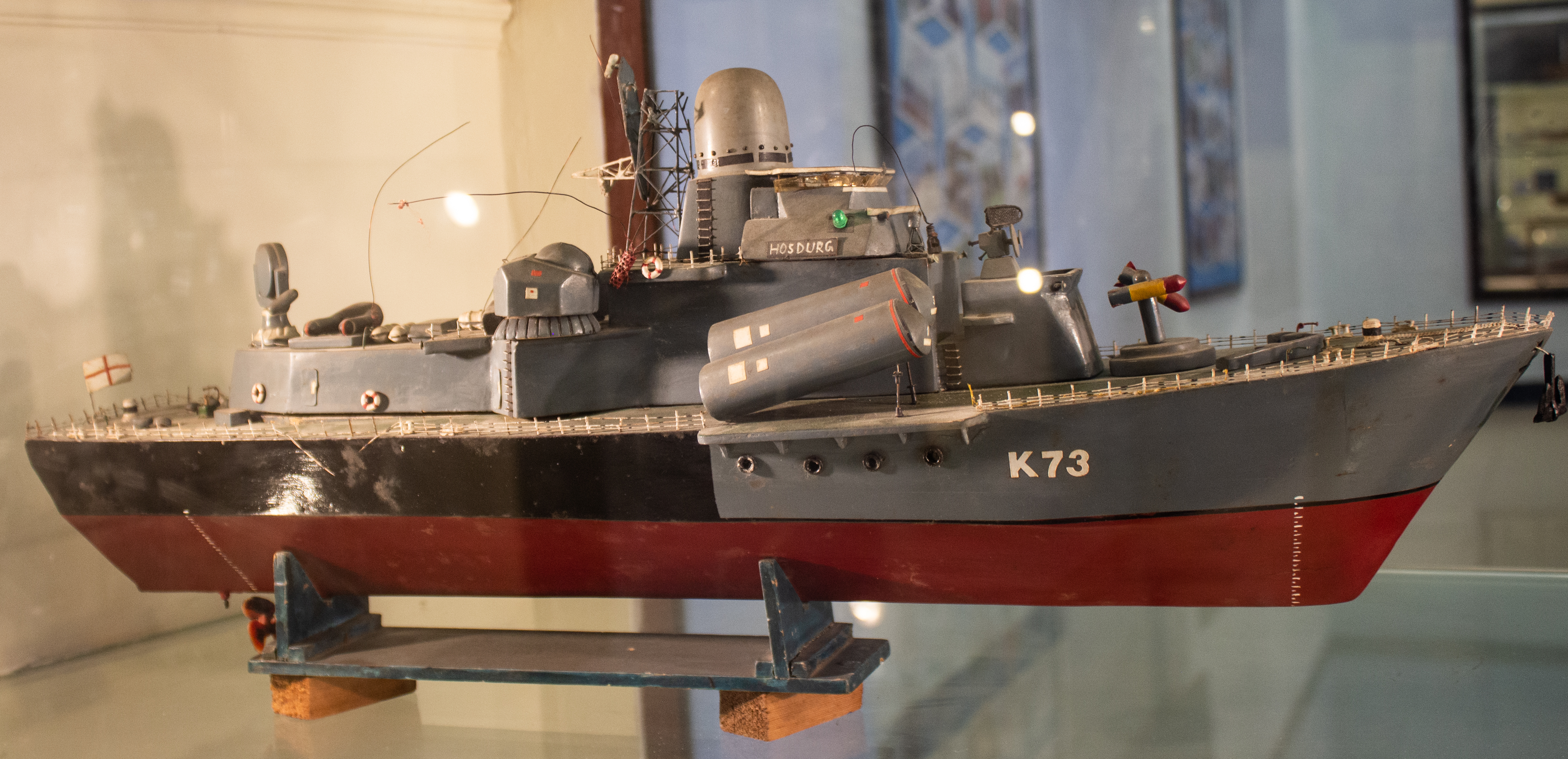
- Model of INS Hosdurg (K73), on display at Visakha Museum

History

India
- Name: INS Hosdurg
- Namesake: Hosdurg Fort
- Commissioned: 15 January 1978
- Decommissioned: 5 June 1999
- Fate: Sunk in June 2000, in a Sea Eagle test

General characteristics
- Class & type: Durg class corvette
- Displacement: 670 tons (full load)
- Length: 59 meters
- Beam: 12.5 meters
- Draught: 2.5 meters
- Speed: 32 knots
- Complement: 42 (incl 7 officers)
- Armament: 4 × SS-N-2C Anti-Ship Missile; 1 × OSA-M (SA-N-4) Surface to air missile; 2 × 57 millimetres (2.2 in) guns

INS Hosdurg (K73) was the third ship of the Durg class corvettes of the Indian Navy. The ship was commissioned on 15 January 1978 and decommissioned on 5 June 1999. The ship was named after Hosdurg Fort, a fort in Kerala. It was built at Leningrad, Russia.

== Decommissioning ==
The Hosdurg was decommissioned on 5 June 1999. In June 2000, she was sunk in a test of a long-range Sea Eagle Anti-Ship Missile fired by a Jaguar IM of the Indian Air Force.
