= INS Sindhudurg =

Retired Indian Corvette

History

India
- Name: INS Sindhudurg
- Namesake: Sindhudurg Fort
- Commissioned: 29 May 1977
- Decommissioned: 24 September 2004
- Fate: Decommissioned, Sunk as part of a weapons test.

General characteristics
- Class & type: Durg class corvette
- Displacement: 670 tons (full load)
- Length: 59 meters
- Beam: 12.5 meters
- Draught: 2.5 meters
- Speed: 32 knots
- Complement: 42 (incl 7 officers)

INS Sindhudurg (K72) was the second ship of the Durg class corvettes of the Indian Navy. It is the second of the three Nanuchka class missile corvettes procured from the former USSR.

The ship was commissioned on 29 May 1977 and decommissioned on 24 September 2004 after 27 years of service. The ship has the distinction of bringing down a surface-to-air missile during an exercise.

The Vessel was subsequently sunk while being used as a target in order to test the Brahmos missile system.
