= Basset-class trawler =

Class of Royal Navy trawlers

Class overview
- Operators: Royal Navy; Royal Canadian Navy; Indian Navy
- Subclasses: Fundy class
- Built: 1935–1938 (RN); 1937–1939 (RCN); 1941–1944 (RIN)
- Completed: 2 (RN); 4 (RCN); 22 (RIN)
- Lost: 1 (RN)

General characteristics
- Type: Naval trawler
- Displacement: 521 long tons (529 t)
- Length: 160 ft 6 in (48.92 m)
- Beam: 27 ft 1 in (8.26 m)
- Draught: 10 ft 7 in (3.23 m) (mean)
- Propulsion: 1 triple expansion reciprocating engine, 1 shaft, 850 ihp (634 kW)
- Speed: 12.5 knots (23.2 km/h; 14.4 mph)
- Complement: 33 (RIN 48)
- Armament: 1 × 12-pounder gun, or, 1 x 4in gun; 4 × depth charges

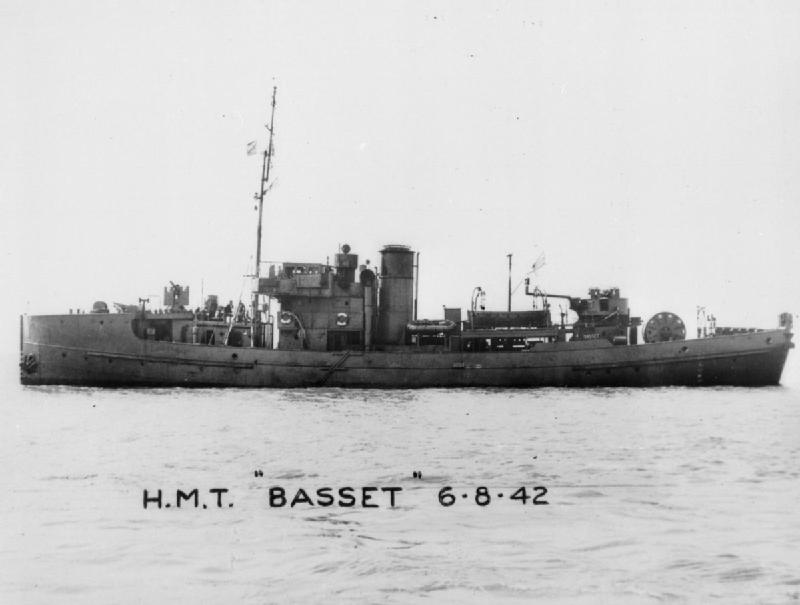
British naval trawler HMT Basset

The Basset class of Admiralty trawlers was a class of trawlers built for the British Royal Navy prior to the outbreak of Second World War. The vessels were intended for use as minesweepers and for anti-submarine warfare, and the design was based on commercial types, adapted for naval use. The purpose of the order was to make use of specialist mercantile shipyards to provide vessels for war use by adapting commercial designs to Admiralty specifications. Orders were placed at shipyards in Britain, Canada and India for the Royal Navy, the Royal Canadian Navy and the Royal Indian Navy.

== Royal Navy ==
Two vessels, Basset and Mastiff, were built by Henry Robb, of Leith. The main difference between them was that Basset had coal-fired, and Mastiff had oil-fired, engines. With the onset of war, Bassett served as the prototype for a series of Admiralty trawlers, of which a total of 180 were built during the conflict using a variety of naming schemes. The first 20 vessels were ordered under the 1939 programme (the Tree class), 30 vessels under the 1939 War Emergency programme in two groups (20 Dance class, and 10 Shakespearian class), and a further 130 over the next four years (the Western Isles (or, simply, Isles) class).

== Royal Canadian Navy ==
Four vessels were built for the Royal Canadian Navy at various yards; these ships had strengthened hulls to cope with pack ice conditions and were also known as the Fundy class.

A further 16 vessels were ordered from Canadian shipyards in the war years, also bearing Canadian names. These were for the Royal Navy, though eight of these were transferred on completion to the Royal Canadian Navy. These are usually referred to as Canadian Isles-class trawlers.

== Royal Indian Navy ==
A total of 50 vessels were ordered from Indian yards (including two for the Ceylon Government) though in the event more than half were cancelled. Twenty-two were completed during the war; another 25 were cancelled and four were destroyed before completion when invading Japanese forces in 1942 over-ran their shipyards in Burma. These vessels bore the names of Indian cities, but are variously referred to as Indian Basset class or Indian Isles-class trawlers.

== Ships ==
=== Royal Navy ===
- Basset (T68)
- Mastiff (T10), mined 20 November 1939 in the Thames estuary

=== Royal Canadian Navy (Fundy-class minesweepers) ===
- Comox (J64)
- Fundy (J88)
- Gaspe (J94)
- Nanoose (J35)(ex Nootka)

=== Royal Indian Navy ===
- Agra (T254)
- Ahmedabad (T264)
- Amritsar (T261)
- Baroda (T249)
- Berar (T256)
- Calcutta (T339)
- Cochin (T315)
- Cuttack (T251)
- Karachi (T262)
- Lahore (T253)
- Lucknow (T267)
- Madura (T268)
- Multan (T322)
- Nagpur (T269)
- Nasik (T258)
- Patna (T255)
- Peshawar (T263)
- Poona (T260)
- Quetta (T332)
- Rampur (T212)
- Shillong (T250)
- Travancore (T312)

== See also ==
- Trawlers of the Royal Navy
