= HMIS Baroda =

Minesweeper of the Royal Indian Navy

History

India
- Name: Baroda
- Namesake: Baroda, city in Gujarat
- Owner: Royal Indian Navy
- Ordered: 29 July 1940
- Builder: Shalimar Engineering and Shipbuilding (Seebpore)
- Laid down: 28 October 1940
- Launched: 22 October 1941
- Commissioned: December 1942
- Decommissioned: 1946
- Fate: Transferred 1948, to Pakistan

General characteristics
- Class & type: Basset-class naval trawler
- Displacement: 521 long tons (529 t)
- Length: 160 ft 6 in (48.92 m)
- Beam: 27 ft 1 in (8.26 m)
- Draught: 10 ft 7 in (3.23 m) (mean)
- Propulsion: 1 triple expansion reciprocating engine, 1 shaft, 850 ihp (634 kW)
- Speed: 12.5 knots (14.4 mph; 23.2 km/h)
- Complement: 33 (RIN 48)
- Armament: 1 × 12-pounder gun, or, 1 x 4in gun; 4 × depth charges

HMIS Baroda (T249) was a Basset-class minesweeping trawler of the Royal Indian Navy, one of twenty-two built during the Second World War, and the second HMIS vessel produced within India. She was laid down in October 1940, and launched in October 1941, serving until 1948 when she was transferred to Pakistan.
