= INS Vijaydurg =

Retired Indian Corvette

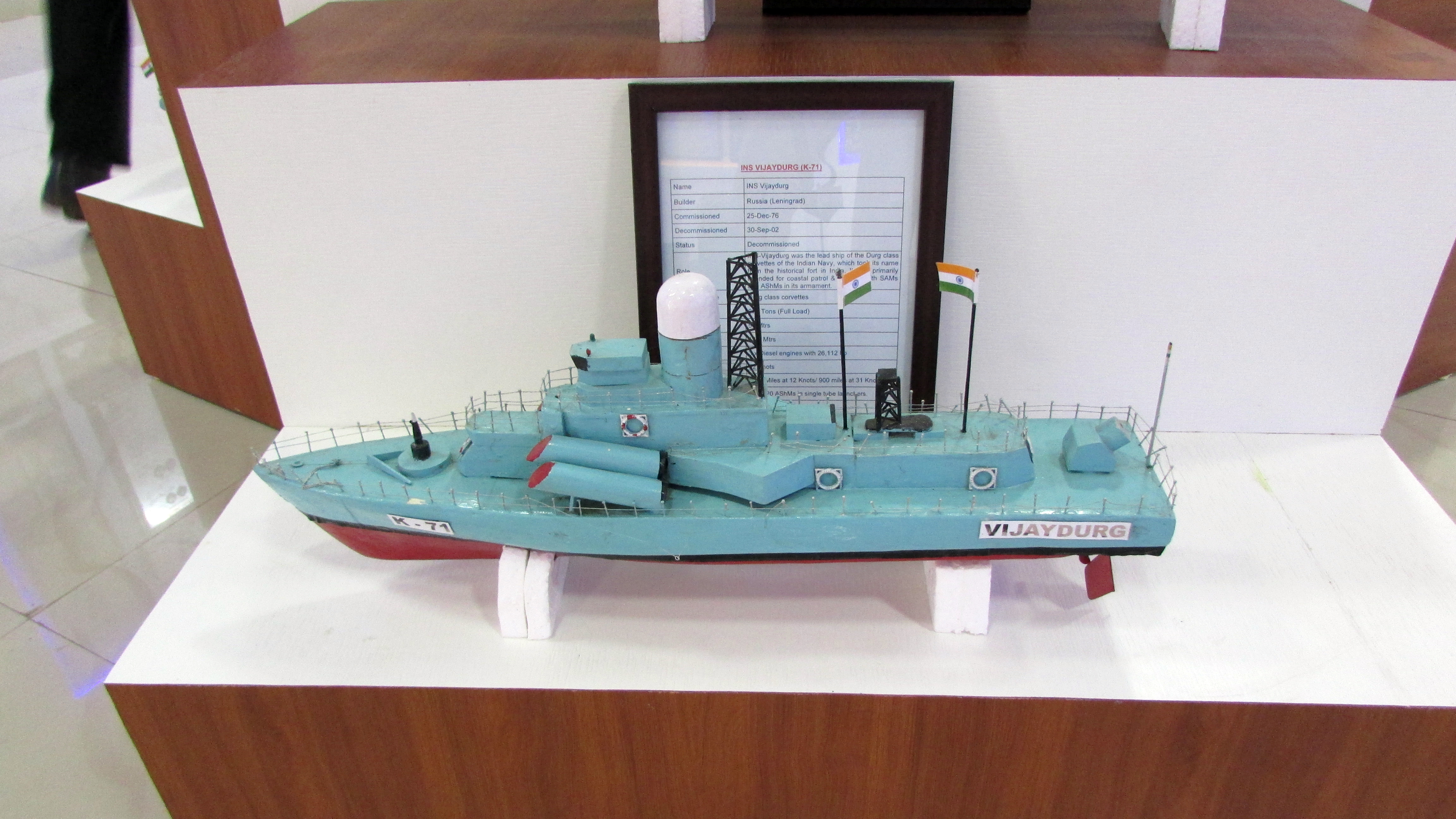
- a scale model in Yodhasthal Museum

History

India
- Name: INS Vijaydurg
- Namesake: Vijaydurg fort
- Commissioned: 25 December 1976
- Decommissioned: 30 September 2002
- Fate: Decommissioned

General characteristics
- Class & type: Durg-class corvette
- Displacement: 670 tons (full load)
- Length: 59 meters
- Beam: 12.5 meters
- Draught: 2.5 meters
- Speed: 32 knots
- Complement: 42 (incl 7 officers)

INS Vijaydurg (K71) was the lead ship of the Durg-class corvettes of the Indian Navy.

The ship was commissioned on 25 December 1976 and decommissioned on 30 September 2002.
