= HMCS Asbestos =

Modified Flower-class corvette

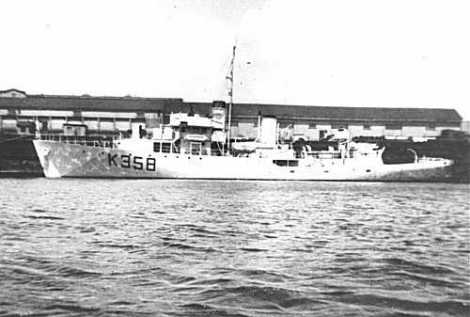
- HMCS Asbestos

History

Canada
- Name: Asbestos
- Namesake: Asbestos, Quebec
- Ordered: June 1942
- Builder: Morton Engineering & Dry Dock Co., Quebec City
- Laid down: 20 July 1943
- Launched: 22 November 1943
- Commissioned: 16 June 1944
- Decommissioned: 8 July 1945
- Identification: Pennant number: K358
- Honours and awards: Atlantic 1944-45
- Fate: Sold 1947. Wrecked off Cuba 13 February 1949. Wreck salvaged and scrapped in March 1949 at New Orleans.

General characteristics
- Class & type: Flower-class corvette (modified)
- Displacement: 1,015 long tons (1,031 t; 1,137 short tons)
- Length: 208 ft (63.40 m)o/a
- Beam: 33 ft (10.06 m)
- Draught: 11 ft (3.35 m)
- Propulsion: single shaft, 2 × oil fired water tube boilers, 1 triple-expansion reciprocating steam engine, 2,750 ihp (2,050 kW)
- Speed: 16 knots (29.6 km/h)
- Range: 3,500 nautical miles (6,482 km) at 12 knots (22.2 km/h)
- Complement: 90
- Sensors & processing systems: One Type 271 SW2C radar, one Type 144 sonar
- Armament: 1 × 4 in (102 mm) BL Mk.IX single gun; 1 × 2-pounder Mk.VIII single "pom-pom"; 2 × 20 mm Oerlikon single; 1 × Hedgehog A/S mortar; 4 × Mk.II depth charge throwers; 2 depth charge rails with 70 depth charges

HMCS Asbestos was a Flower-class corvette that served in the Royal Canadian Navy during the Second World War. She fought primarily in the Battle of the Atlantic as a convoy escort. She was named for Asbestos, Quebec.

== Background ==
Flower-class corvettes like Asbestos serving with the Royal Canadian Navy during the Second World War were different from earlier and more traditional sail-driven corvettes. The "corvette" designation was created by the French as a class of small warships; the Royal Navy borrowed the term for a period but discontinued its use in 1877. During the hurried preparations for war in the late 1930s, Winston Churchill reactivated the corvette class, needing a name for smaller ships used in an escort capacity, in this case based on a whaling ship design. The generic name "flower" was used to designate the class of these ships, which – in the Royal Navy – were named after flowering plants.

Corvettes commissioned by the Royal Canadian Navy during the Second World War were named after communities for the most part, to better represent the people who took part in building them. This idea was put forth by Admiral Percy W. Nelles. Sponsors were commonly associated with the community for which the ship was named. Royal Navy corvettes were designed as open sea escorts, while Canadian corvettes were developed for coastal auxiliary roles which was exemplified by their minesweeping gear. Eventually the Canadian corvettes would be modified to allow them to perform better on the open seas.

== Construction ==
Asbestos followed the design of the modified Flower-class corvettes and was ordered June 1942 as part of the 1943-44 Flower class building program. The only significant difference is that the majority of the 43-44 program replaced the 2-pounder Mk.VIII single "pom-pom" anti-aircraft gun with 2 twin 20-mm and 2 single 20-mm anti-aircraft guns. She was laid down on 20 July 1943 by Morton Engineering & Dry Dock Co. at Quebec City, Quebec and launched on 22 November 1943. She was commissioned into the RCN on 16 June 1944 at Quebec City.

== War service ==
Asbestos arrived at Halifax on 9 July before moving on to Bermuda for working up. Following working up she headed for St John's after being assigned to the Mid-Ocean Escort Force on 21 August. She joined convoy HXF.307 on 10 September as a member of Escort Group C-2. She continued on as a member of this group on convoy duties until the end of the war in Europe.

== Fate ==
She was paid off from the RCN on 8 July 1945 and laid up on Sorel, Quebec. She was transferred to the War Assets Corporation and sold to the Dominican Navy in 1947. She was wrecked off Cuba whilst en route on 13 February 1949. The wreck was salvaged and taken to New Orleans, Louisiana for scrapping in March 1949.
