= HMIS Amritsar =

Minesweeper of the Royal Indian Navy

History

India
- Name: Amritsar
- Namesake: Amritsar, city in Punjab, India
- Owner: Royal Indian Navy
- Ordered: 16 February 1941
- Builder: Garden Reach Shipbuilders & Engineers Ltd. (Calcutta)
- Laid down: 4 August 1941
- Launched: 19 December 1941
- Commissioned: 20 November 1942
- Decommissioned: 1947
- Fate: Decommissioned in 1947

General characteristics
- Class & type: Basset-class naval trawler
- Displacement: 521 long tons (529 t)
- Length: 160 ft 6 in (48.92 m)
- Beam: 27 ft 1 in (8.26 m)
- Draught: 10 ft 7 in (3.23 m) (mean)
- Propulsion: 1 triple expansion reciprocating engine, 1 shaft, 850 ihp (634 kW)
- Speed: 12.5 knots (14.4 mph; 23.2 km/h)
- Complement: 33 (RIN 48)
- Armament: 1 × 12-pounder gun, or, 1 × 4 in gun; 4 × depth charges

HMIS Amritsar (T261) was a Basset-class minesweeping trawler of the Royal Indian Navy, one of twenty-two built during the Second World War She was laid down in August 1941, and launched in December 1941, serving until 1947 when she was decommissioned.
