= Minesweeper =

Vessel for locating and removing naval mines

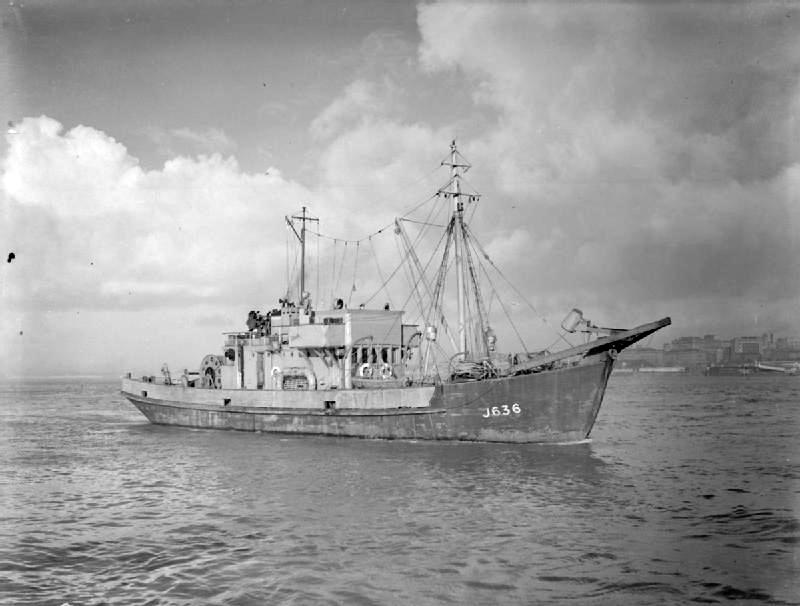
Minesweeper J 636 underway in British coastal waters during World War II

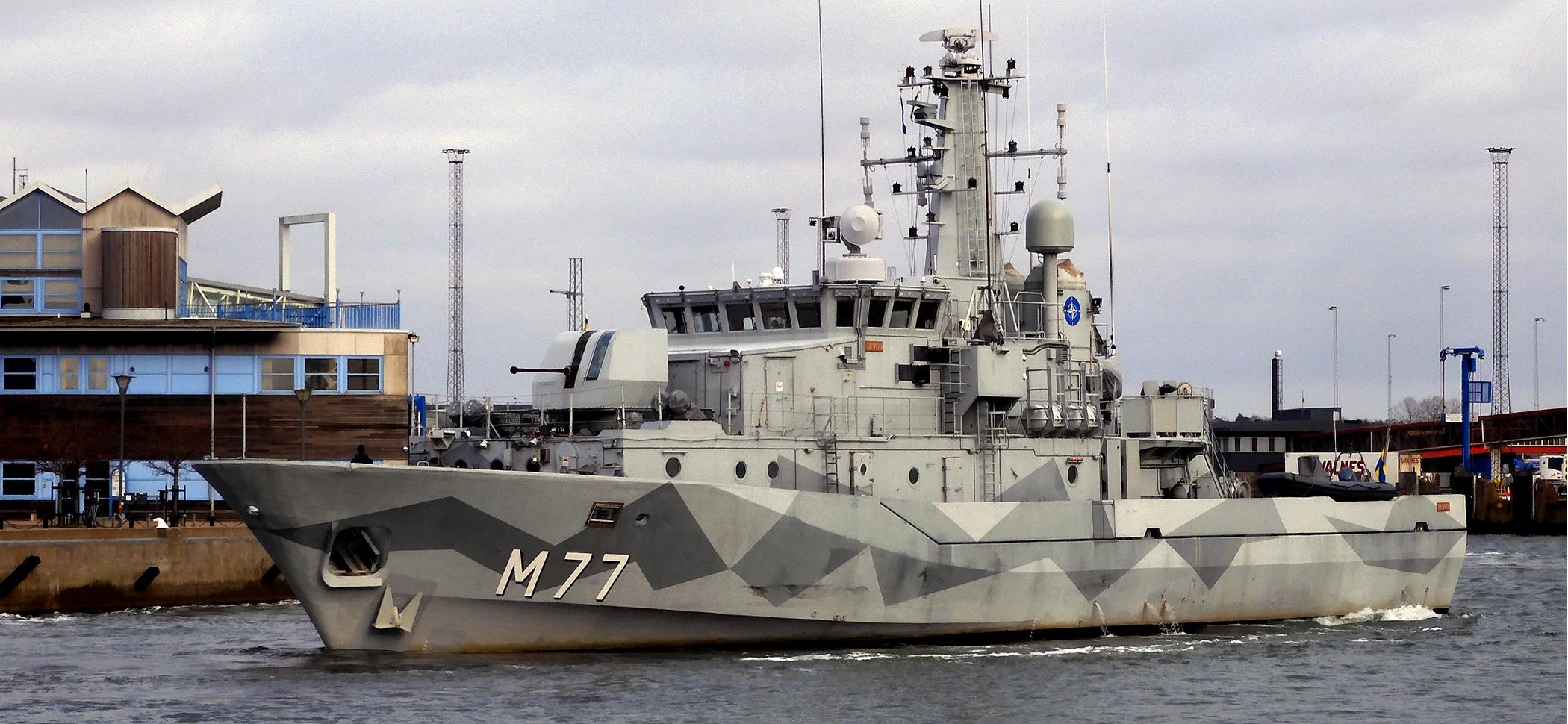
The Swedish minesweeper HMS Ulvön visiting Ystad March 3, 2025

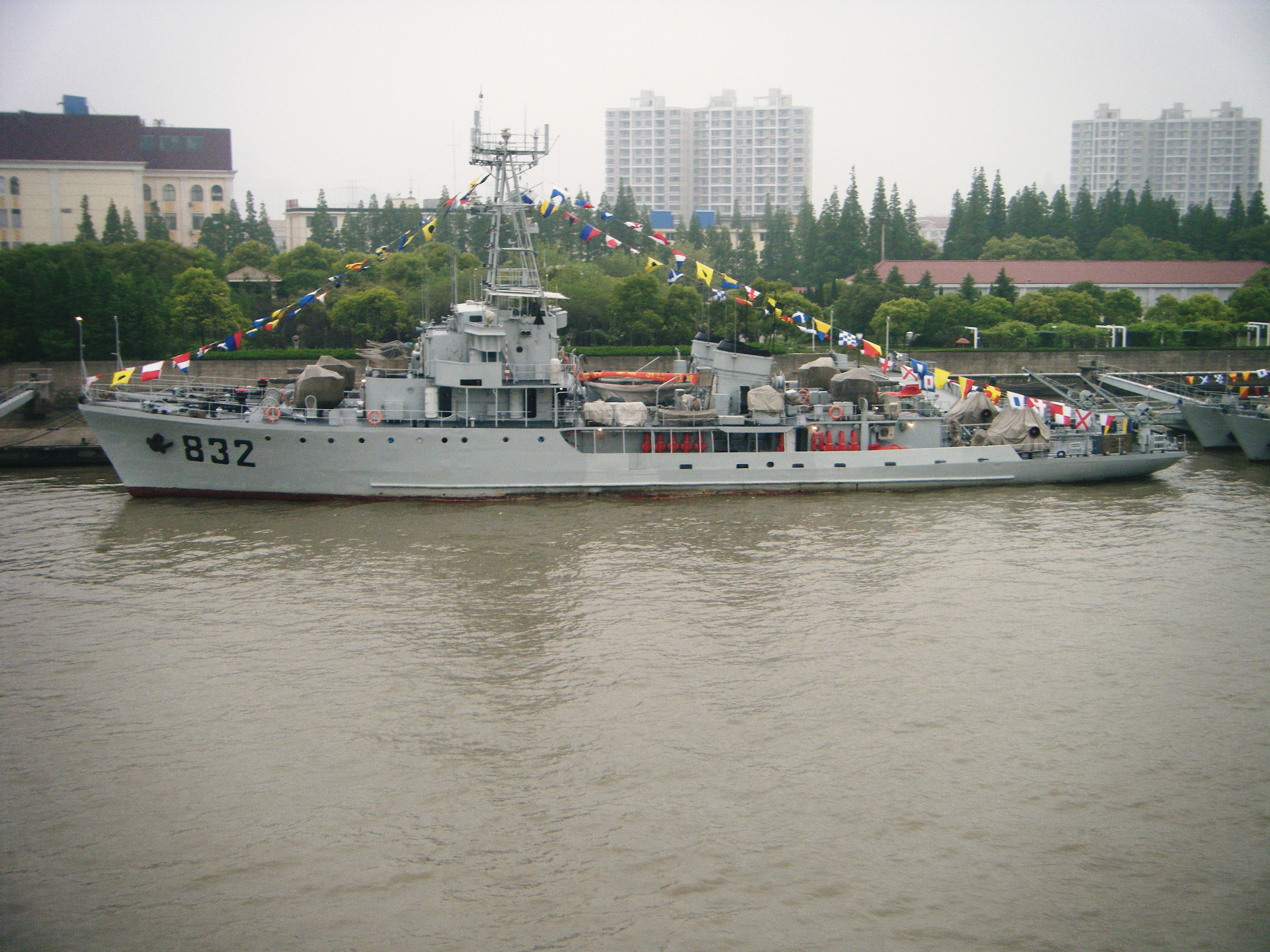
Chinese Navy minesweeper

A minesweeper is a small warship designed to remove or detonate naval mines. Using various mechanisms intended to counter the threat posed by naval mines, minesweepers keep waterways clear for safe shipping.

== History ==
The earliest known usage of the naval mine dates to the Ming dynasty. Dedicated minesweepers, however, only appeared many centuries later during the Crimean War, when they were deployed by the British. The Crimean War minesweepers were rowboats trailing grapnels to snag mines. Minesweeping technology picked up in the Russo-Japanese War, using aging torpedo boats as minesweepers.

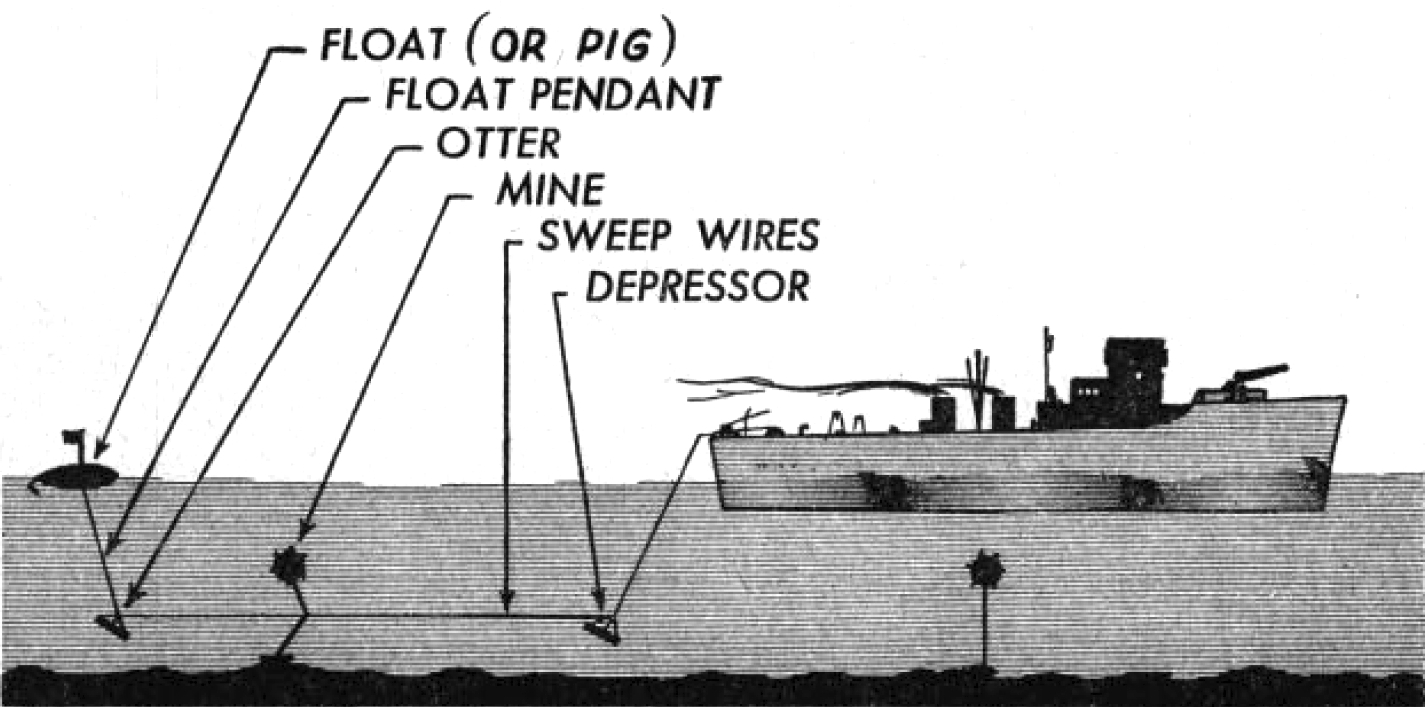
A minesweeper cutting loose moored mines

In Britain, naval leaders recognized before the outbreak of World War I that the development of sea mines was a threat to the nation's shipping and began efforts to counter the threat. Sir Arthur Wilson noted the real threat of the time was a blockade aided by mines and not an invasion. The function of the fishing fleet's trawlers with their trawl gear was recognized as having a natural connection with mine clearance and, among other things, trawlers were used to keep the English Channel clear of mines. A Trawler Section of the Royal Navy Reserve became the predecessor of the mine sweeping forces with specially designed ships and equipment to follow. These reserve Trawler Section fishermen and their trawlers were activated, supplied with mine gear, rifles, and uniforms, and paid as the first minesweepers. The dedicated, purpose-built minesweeper first appeared during World War I with the Flower-class minesweeping sloop. By the end of the war, however, naval mine technology had grown beyond the ability of minesweepers to detect and remove mines.

Minesweeping made significant advancements during World War II. Combatant nations quickly adapted ships to the task of minesweeping, including Australia's 35 civilian ships that became auxiliary minesweepers. Both Allied and Axis countries made heavy use of minesweepers throughout the war. Historian Gordon Williamson wrote that "Germany's minesweepers alone formed a massive proportion of its total strength, and are very much the unsung heroes of the Kriegsmarine." Naval mines remained a threat even after the war ended, and minesweeping crews were still active after VJ Day. After the Second World War, Allied countries worked on new classes of minesweepers ranging from 120-ton designs for clearing estuaries to 735-ton oceangoing vessels. The United States Navy even used specialized mechanized landing craft to sweep shallow harbors in and around North Korea.

As of June 2012, the U.S. Navy had four minesweepers deployed to the Persian Gulf to address regional instabilities. The Royal Navy also had four minesweepers stationed in the Persian Gulf as part of the 9th Mine Counter-Measures Squadron until early 2026.

== Operation and requirements ==
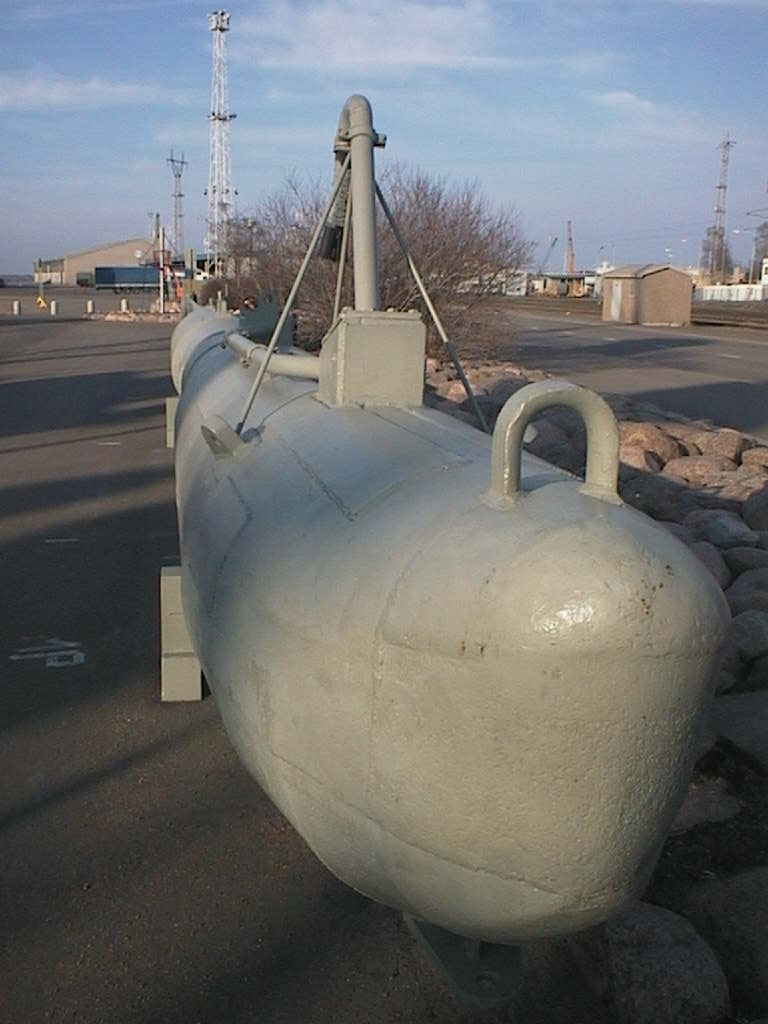
Magnetic naval minesweeper as a monument in Kotka, Finland

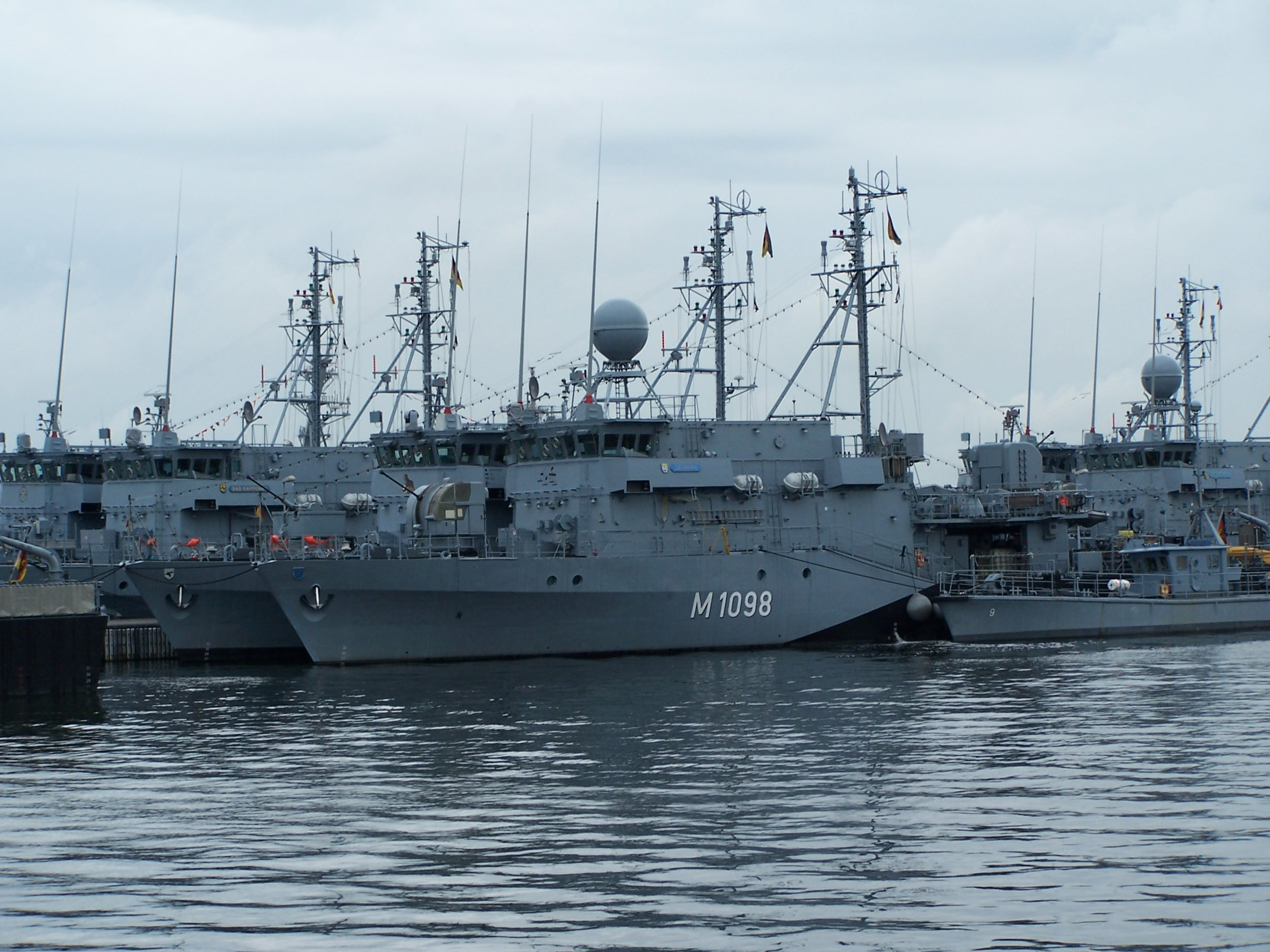
Siegburg, a modern Ensdorf-class minesweeper of the German Navy

Minesweepers are equipped with mechanical or electrical devices known as "sweeps" for disabling mines. The modern minesweeper is designed to reduce the chances of it detonating mines itself; it is soundproofed to reduce its acoustic signature and often constructed using wood, fiberglass, or non-ferrous metal, or is degaussed to reduce its magnetic signature.

Mechanical sweeps are devices designed to cut the anchoring cables of moored mines, and preferably attach a tag to help the subsequent localization and neutralization. They are towed behind the minesweeper and use a towed body (e.g., oropesa, paravane) to maintain the sweep at the desired depth and position. Influence sweeps are equipment, often towed, that emulate a particular ship signature, thereby causing a mine to detonate.

There are two modes of operating an influence sweep: MSM (mine setting mode) and TSM (target simulation mode or target setting mode). MSM sweeping is founded on intelligence on a given type of mine, and produces the output required for detonation of this mine. If such intelligence is unavailable, the TSM sweeping instead reproduces the influence of the friendly ship that is about to transit the area. TSM sweeping thus clears mines directed at this ship without knowledge of the mines. However, mines directed at other ships might remain.

The minesweeper differs from a minehunter; the minehunter actively detects and neutralizes individual mines. Minesweepers are in many cases complementary to minehunters, depending on the operation and the environment; a minesweeper is, in particular, better suited to clearing open-water areas with large numbers of mines. Both kinds of ships are collectively called mine countermeasure vessels (MCMV), a term also applied to a vessel that combines both roles.

== Aerial minesweeping drones ==
In March 2026 the British government indicated that it had aerial minesweeping drones and was considering deploying them in the strait of Hormuz.

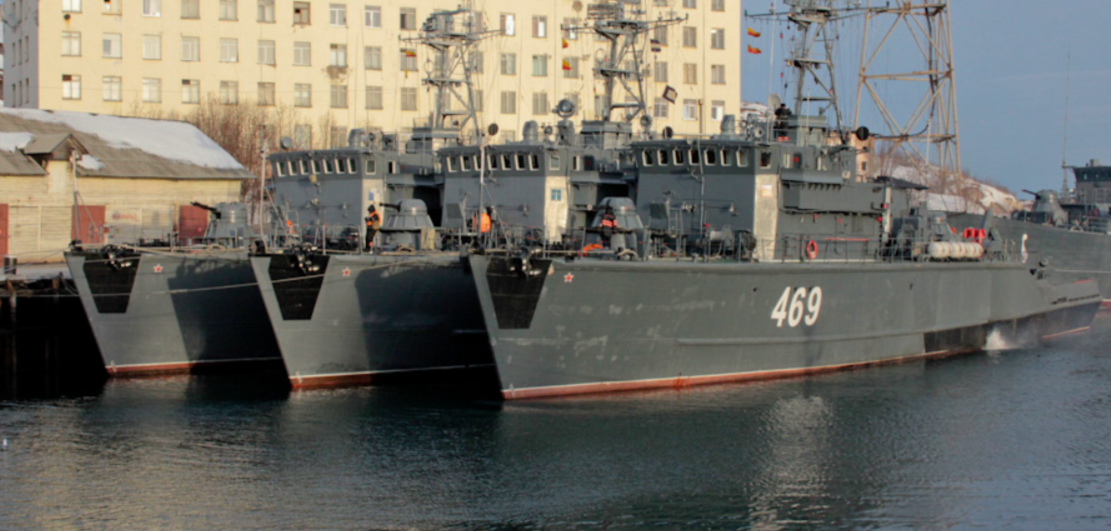
Basic minesweepers of project 1265. USSR

== See also ==
- List of minesweeper classes
- Demining – Process of removing land mines
- Destroyer minesweeper – US Navy WWII type of ship
- Minehunter – Vessel for detecting and destroying naval mines
- List of mine warfare vessels of the United States Navy
- List of mine countermeasure vessels of the Royal Navy
- List of mine warfare vessels of the Second World War
