= HMIS Agra =

Minesweeper of the Royal Indian Navy

History

India
- Name: Agra
- Namesake: Agra, city in Northern India
- Owner: Royal Indian Navy
- Ordered: 29 July 1940
- Builder: Hooghly Docking & Engineering Company Ltd. (Calcutta)
- Laid down: 11 November 1940
- Launched: 19 March 1942
- Commissioned: 15 April 1942
- Decommissioned: 1946
- Fate: Sold 1948, scrapped February 1963

General characteristics
- Class & type: Basset-class naval trawler
- Type: Naval trawler
- Displacement: 521 long tons (529 t)
- Length: 160 ft 6 in (48.92 m)
- Beam: 27 ft 1 in (8.26 m)
- Draught: 10 ft 7 in (3.23 m) (mean)
- Propulsion: 1 triple expansion reciprocating engine, 1 shaft, 850 ihp (634 kW)
- Speed: 12.5 knots (14.4 mph; 23.2 km/h)
- Complement: 33 (RIN 48)
- Armament: 1 × 12-pounder gun, or, 1 x 4in gun; 4 × depth charges

HMIS Agra (T254) was a minesweeping trawler of the Royal Indian Navy, one of twenty-two built to the design of the Royal Navy's Basset-class during the Second World War. She was laid down in November 1940, and launched in April 1942, serving until her decommissioning in 1946.
