= HMIS Ahmedabad =

Anti-submarine trawler, Royal Indian Navy

History

India
- Name: Ahmedabad
- Namesake: Ahmedabad, city in Northern India
- Owner: Royal Indian Navy
- Ordered: 16 February 1941
- Builder: Scindia Steam Navigation Co., Bombay
- Laid down: 12 June 1941
- Launched: 28 October 1943
- Commissioned: 4 September 1944
- Fate: Sold in April 1947

General characteristics
- Class & type: Basset-class naval trawler
- Type: Naval trawler
- Displacement: 521 long tons (529 t)
- Length: 160 ft 6 in (48.92 m)
- Beam: 27 ft 1 in (8.26 m)
- Draught: 10 ft 7 in (3.23 m) (mean)
- Propulsion: 1 triple expansion reciprocating engine, 1 shaft, 850 ihp (634 kW)
- Speed: 12.5 knots (14.4 mph; 23.2 km/h)
- Complement: 33 (RIN 48)
- Armament: 1 × 12-pounder gun, or, 1 x 4in gun; 4 × depth charges

HMIS Ahmedabad (T 264) was a Basset-class trawler that was part of the Royal Indian Navy. The ship was laid down in Bombay by Scindia Steam Navigation Co Ltd in 1941 and was launched in 1943. She was under the command of Lieutenant Robert Love of the Royal Indian Naval Reserve from the 14th April 1944 until early 1945, when he was replaced by Lieutenant Hosi Behramji Dubash of the Royal Indian Naval Volunteer Reserve Ahmedabad was an anti-submarine trawler. One of the journeys that the ship made was during a cyclone in 1945 on the Indian east coast from Visakhapatnam to search for a landing craft tank (LCT) but in Coconda, Ahmedabad grounded and had to be salvaged.
