= Operation Robson =

British air raid on Japanese oil refineries

- Part of the Pacific Theatre of World War II
Date	20 December 1944
Location	Sumatra, Netherlands East Indies
Result	Limited Allied operational success

Belligerents
United Kingdom	Japan

Commanders and leaders
(United Kingdom) Philip Vian	(Empire of Japan) Unknown

Strength
60 planes 2 aircraft carriers 3 cruisers 7 destroyers 1 oiler	Anti air defences

Casualties and losses
1 torpedo bomber	1 bomber Facilities damaged

Operation Robson (20 December 1944) was the first of a series of aerial operations, Operation Outflank, undertaken by the British Pacific Fleet (BPF) against the oil refineries of Japanese-occupied Sumatra during World War II. Admiral Chester Nimitz, Commander in Chief, Pacific Ocean Areas, proposed a strike on the refineries to Admiral Bruce Fraser, commander of the BPF, during a meeting in early December.

The primary target of Operation Robson was the refinery at Pangkalan Brandan. It had been fired by fleeing American and Dutch personnel during the invasion of the Dutch East Indies in 1942, but the Japanese had repaired it by the year's end. Refined product was piped from there to the port of Pangkalan Susu eight miles away and to the more distant deep-water port of Belawan Deli, the secondary target. Pangkalan Soesoe had tanks capable of holding thirty million gallons.

== Order of battle ==
The naval order of battle for the operation consisted of two forces: Force 67, the strike force, and Force 69, the oiler group. The commander, Admiral Philip Vian, had his flag aboard the aircraft carrier HMS Indomitable (carrying 857, 1839 and 1844 Naval Air Squadrons). Also in Force 67 were the carrier Illustrious (carrying 854, 1830 and 1833 Naval Air Squadrons), the cruisers Argonaut, Black Prince and Newcastle, and the destroyers Kempenfelt, Wakeful, Wessex, Whirlwind and Wrangler. The oiler group comprised RFA Wave King and the destroyers Wager and Whelp.

The strike force departed from Trincomalee on 17 December, and met Force 69 the next day (18 December). Argonaut, Black Prince and the destroyers of Force 67 refuelled. Undetected, the fleet reached the flying-off position, north of Diamond Point, in the early morning of 20 December. The aerial order of battle consisted of a strike force and an escort force. For the former, Indomitable supplied twelve and Illustrious sixteen Grumman TBF Avengers, each with four 500-lb bombs, and Illustrious supplied a further four Vought F4U Corsairs, each with two 500-lb bombs. The strike leader was Lieutenant Commander W. Stuart. Among the escorts, top cover was provided by eight Grumman F6F Hellcats from Indomitable, middle cover by twelve Corsairs from Illustrious, and close cover by a further eight Hellcats from Indomitable.

== Operation ==
At the flying-off position, low clouds and heavy squalls reduced visibility, prompting Vian to postpone the launch twenty minutes. The operation finally began at 0636. One of Indomitable′s Avengers crashed into the sea after takeoff, but its crew escaped unscathed. The other Avengers and the escort force departed from the fleet at 0715, and the strike Corsairs took off shortly after. The strike force ran into a barrier of clouds as they approached the Sumatran coast. Strike Leader Stuart advanced through a gap in the clouds to inspect the target but was unable to locate it. The strike was diverted to the secondary target, Belawan Deli, where the weather was little better.

The Avengers bombed the wharves from 1500 feet, while the Corsairs strafed the fuel storage tanks and warehouses in the town. A train was also hit at nearby Kualasimpang. Two of the Corsairs became lost and strafed a large storage tank at either Pangkalan Brandan or Pangkalan Susu. The defences of Belawan Deli were unprepared: the anti-aircraft artillery was ineffective and no fighters were put in the air, although one Mitsubishi Ki-21 was surprised and downed by a Hellcat. The raid ended in chaos, with complete loss of radio discipline. The strike force and escorts rendezvoused just beneath the clouds. Lieutenant Commander W. J. Mainprice had to form up his squadron (No. 854) and lead them back on his own initiative because of the "radio bedlam". All 55 aircraft returned safely and the four Corsairs landed by 1050, and the force retired.

== Aftermath ==
On the afternoon of the attack, a Japanese radio message was intercepted: "Am closing down now, will call you later." At the suggestion of Captain C. E. Lambe of Illustrious, eight of his Corsairs and eight Hellcats from Indomitable were dispatched for a low-level sweep over the airfields at Sabang and Oleelhoe, the port of Kota Raja. No Japanese aircraft were spotted, either on the ground or in the air. Force 67 had returned to Trincomalee by 22 December.

Despite the lack of opposition met, Operation Robson was considered a failure on account of the bad weather and the lack of radio discipline. The subsequent operations of Outflank—Lentil and Meridian—engendered a much greater response from the Japanese and concomitant British losses.

== Sources ==
- Winton, John (1970). The Forgotten Fleet: The British Navy in the Pacific, 1944–1945. New York: Coward-McCann.
- Hobbs, David (2011). The British Pacific Fleet: The Royal Navy's Most Powerful Strike Force. Seaforth. pp. 63–64.
