= HMS Whelp (R37) =

W-class destroyer built for the Royal Navy during the Second World War

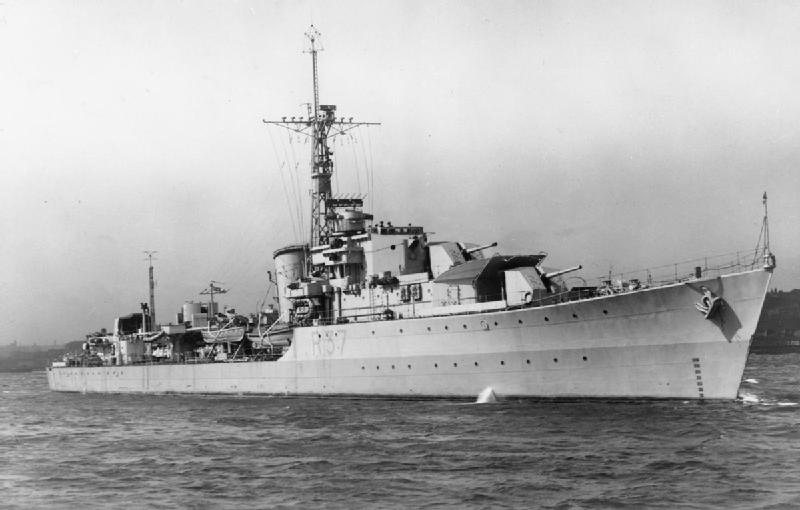
- Whelp underway on the Tyne, 1944

History

United Kingdom
- Name: Whelp
- Ordered: 3 December 1941
- Builder: Hawthorn Leslie and Company, Hebburn
- Laid down: 1 May 1942
- Launched: 3 June 1943
- Commissioned: 25 April 1944
- Decommissioned: January 1946
- Fate: Sold to the South African Navy, 25 April 1952

South Africa
- Name: SAS Simon van der Stel
- Namesake: Simon van der Stel
- Acquired: 25 April 1952
- Commissioned: 20 March 1953
- Out of service: 27 March 1972
- Renamed: 20 March 1953
- Reclassified: Converted into an anti-submarine frigate, 1962–64
- Fate: Scrapped, 1976

General characteristics (as built)
- Class & type: W-class destroyer
- Displacement: 1,710 long tons (1,740 t) (standard load); 2,530 long tons (2,570 t) (deep load)
- Length: 362 ft 9 in (110.6 m)
- Beam: 35 ft 8 in (10.9 m)
- Draught: 14 ft 6 in (4.4 m) (deep load)
- Installed power: 2 Admiralty 3-drum boilers; 40,000 shp (30,000 kW)
- Propulsion: 2 shafts; 2 × geared steam turbines
- Speed: 36 knots (67 km/h; 41 mph)
- Range: 4,675 nmi (8,658 km; 5,380 mi) at 20 knots (37 km/h; 23 mph)
- Complement: 179
- Sensors & processing systems: ASDIC; Type 272 surface-search radar; Type 282 and 285 gunnery radars; Type 291 early-warning radar
- Armament: 4 × single 4.7-inch (120 mm) guns; 1 × quadruple 2-pounder (40 mm) "pom-pom" AA gun; 4 × twin Oerlikon 20 mm (0.8 in) AA guns; 2 × quadruple 21 inch (533 mm) torpedo tubes; 70 depth charges; 4 throwers, 2 rails

HMS Whelp was one of eight W-class destroyers built for the Royal Navy during the Second World War. Completed in 1944, the ship spent most of the war assigned to the Eastern and Pacific Fleets. She screened British aircraft carriers as their aircraft attacked targets in the Japanese-occupied Nicobar Islands, the Dutch East Indies, Formosa and near Okinawa. Whelp was present at the Japanese surrender in Tokyo Bay in 1945 and later in Hong Kong. She was paid off in January 1946 and went into reserve.

Whelp was sold to the South African Navy (SAN) in 1952 and renamed Simon van der Stel. She was subsequently converted into a fast anti-submarine frigate in the early 1960s and served as a training ship from 1968 until 1972 when she went back into reserve. Simon van der Stel was recommissioned in 1975 for a refit, but that proved to be uneconomical and she was scrapped the following year.

== Description ==
The W-class ships displaced 1,710 long tons (1,740 t) at standard load and 2,530 long tons (2,570 t) at deep load. They had an overall length of 362 feet 9 inches (110.6 m), a beam of 35 feet 8 inches (10.9 m) and a mean deep draught of 14 feet 6 inches (4.4 m). The ships were powered by a pair of Parsons geared steam turbines, each driving one propeller shaft, using steam provided by two Admiralty three-drum boilers. The turbines developed a total of 40,000 shaft horsepower (30,000 kW) which gave a maximum speed of 36 knots (67 km/h; 41 mph). They carried 615 long tons (625 t) of fuel oil that gave them a range of 4,675 nautical miles (8,658 km; 5,380 mi) at 20 knots (37 km/h; 23 mph). Their crew numbered 179 officers and ratings.

The W-class destroyers were armed with four single 4.7-inch (120 mm) Mark IX guns, one quadruple mount for 2-pounder (40 mm) Mk II "pom-pom" anti-aircraft (AA) guns and eight Oerlikon 20 mm (0.8 in) light AA guns on twin mounts. They also were equipped with two quadruple mounts for 21 inch (533 mm) torpedo tubes. For anti-submarine work, the ships were fitted with ASDIC and two rails and four throwers for 70 depth charges. They were equipped with a Type 272 surface-search radar, Type 282 and 285 gunnery radars and a Type 291 early-warning radar.

To better defend the ship against Japanese kamikaze suicide aircraft, Whelp had her searchlight replaced by a 40 mm (1.6 in) Bofors AA gun in mid-1944. As part of her 1962–64 refit, the ship's aft torpedo tubes were removed to make room for a small flight deck and hangar for two Westland Wasp helicopters. A pair of Bofors guns were added, one on each side of the hangar, but these were later replaced by the originally intended pair of American 12.75-inch (324 mm) Mk 32 triple-barrelled anti-submarine torpedo tubes. The main guns were replaced by two twin-gun turrets fitted with 4-inch (102 mm) Mk XVI guns, one forward of the bridge and the other aft of the hangar. Her electronics were modernized as well although she retained the existing search radar. The changes increased her crew to 186–210 officers and ratings.

== Construction and career ==
=== British service ===
The W-class destroyers were ordered on 3 December 1941 and Whelp was laid down by Hawthorn Leslie and Company at their shipyard in Hebburn on 1 May 1942. The ship was launched on 3 June 1943 and completed on 14 July 1944. Whelp was adopted by the London Borough of Wembley, using funds they had raised in Warship Week in 1942.

She was initially assigned to the 3rd Destroyer Flotilla (DF) of the Home Fleet and was based in Scapa Flow. During her active service, her captain and first lieutenant were Commander G. A. F. Norfolk and Lieutenant His Royal Highness Prince Philip of Greece and Denmark, the future Duke of Edinburgh. In mid-June, Whelp sailed to Spitsbergen to resupply the small Allied garrison there. Whelp was then assigned to the 27th Destroyer Flotilla which left for the Far East on 2 August and arrived in Trincomalee, Ceylon (now Sri Lanka), on 12 September. En route, the ship covered the Allied invasion of Southern France (Operation Dragoon) in mid-August.

By October, the 27th DF was assigned to the Eastern Fleet in the Indian Ocean and Whelp escorted the aircraft carriers Indomitable and Victorious while their aircraft attacked Nancowry harbour and other targets in the Nicobar Islands as part of Operation Millet. When the Eastern Fleet attempted to attack the oil refinery complex at Pangkalan Brandan, Sumatra, in mid-November, Whelp and her sister ship Wager escorted the oiler RFA Wave King. The British Pacific Fleet (BPF) was formed a few days afterwards and attacked the refinery at Belawan Deli during Operation Robson a month later, as the ship escorted the main body of the fleet. She did much the same during Operation Lentil, another attack on the refinery at Pangkalan Brandan at the beginning of January 1945. Whelp was then detached to tow the damaged submarine HMS Shakespeare to Trincomalee, arriving on 8 January. The BPF departed from the port eight days later, bound for Sydney, Australia. En route its aircraft attacked the refineries in Plaju and Sungai Gerong, Sumatra, on 24 and 29 January (Operation Meridian I & II) before arriving on 10 February. Whelp rescued the crew of a crashed Grumman TBF Avenger, Sub-Lieutenant Roy Halliday and his gunner, Norman Richardson, during the second attack.

On 28 February, the BPF sailed for their forward base at Manus Island and arrived on 7 March and exercised together before sailing for Ulithi on 18 March. The BPF joined the American Fifth Fleet there two days later to participate in the preliminary operations for the invasion of Okinawa. The British role during the operation was to neutralise airfields on the Sakishima Islands, between Okinawa and Formosa, beginning on 26 March. They later attacked airfields in Formosa before returning to the Sakishima Islands. The BPF retired to Leyte Gulf to rest and resupply on 17 April and Whelp, together with Wager, was tasked to escort the badly damaged carrier Illustrious to Sydney on 3 May. They arrived on 14 May and Whelp continued on to Melbourne to begin a refit that lasted until July.

She rejoined the BPF at Sydney (now attached to the United States 3rd Fleet) and on 31 July escorted the battleship Duke of York to Guam, together with Wager, where they arrived on 9 August. Admiral Bruce Fraser, Commander-in-chief of the BPF, conferred with U.S. Admiral Chester Nimitz, the Commander-in-Chief Pacific Fleet Headquarters. The ships then proceeded to rendezvous with the main body of the fleet off the coast of Japan on the 16th. Whelp was the first Allied ship to enter Sagami Bay on 27 August, leading the way for Duke of York and the American battleships Iowa and Missouri. She was present at Tokyo for the formal surrender of the Japanese on 2 September. She left Tokyo on 9 September and, following an overnight stop at Okinawa on 11/12 September, arrived at Hong Kong with Admiral Fraser aboard. He accepted the surrender of the Japanese forces in Hong Kong on 16 September.

Whelp was remained in Hong Kong and conducted anti-piracy patrols along the Chinese coast. On 12 November, the ship departed Hong Kong for Sydney, via Darwin, and arrived there on the 24th to begin a brief refit. She sailed for Britain on 7 December and arrived at Portsmouth on 17 January 1946. Whelp was paid off and was in Category B reserve by 30 May. She was recommissioned on 9 August 1947 and refitted at Portsmouth Royal Dockyard in September–October preparation for the voyage to South Africa in company with her sisters, Kempenfelt, Wessex and Wrangler to form the South Atlantic Reserve Force in Simon's Town. Whelp was damaged while in dock on 8 September 1949. She was scheduled to be converted into a Type 62 air defence frigate, but this was cancelled when that programme was abandoned.

=== South African service ===
Whelp was offered to South Africa in 1950, together with Wessex, but she was not purchased until 25 April 1952 for £420,000. The ship was commissioned on 23 February 1953 and was renamed Simon van der Stel, after the first governor of Cape Colony. Much of the ship's service was as a "grey ambassador", on goodwill visits to Europe and the European colonies in Africa, including a 147-day cruise to Europe in 1954. This began on 14 July, when she departed Durban on what was the longest flag-showing cruise ever by an SAN warship. En route to Portsmouth, Simon van der Stel stopped in Freetown, Sierra Leone, and Dakar, French West Africa and arrived there on 31 July. Then she became the first SAN ship to visit, when the warship berthed in Rotterdam, Netherlands, Derry, Northern Ireland, and Glasgow, Scotland. On 21 October, the ship escorted SAS Gelderland (the former HMS Brayford, a new Ford-class seaward defence boat back home. On their way to Durban, the ships visited France, Portugal, the Canary Islands, Dakar, French West Africa, and French Equatorial Africa before arriving at their destination on 8 December, Simon van der Stel having steamed some 17,200 nautical miles (31,900 km; 19,800 mi). This role, however, declined as South Africa became increasingly isolated during the apartheid years.

The ship was placed in reserve from 1957, but was modernised at Simon's Town Naval Dockyard from 1962 to 1964, and re-commissioned on 27 February 1964. She was modernised according to a modified Type 16 frigate standard, her main armament became four 4-inch guns Mk XVI in two twin positions and she was able to carry two Westland Wasp helicopters. Simon van der Stel remained in commission for just over a year as manpower shortages mandated that she be reduced back to reserve in March 1965. The ship was recommissioned on 17 June 1968 and was briefly assigned to the 10th Frigate Squadron until she was redesignated as a training ship on 1 October. Simon van der Stel visited Portuguese Mozambique later that month. In June 1969, she was ordered to proceed to Gough Island to search for two missing members (Jan Seyffert and Fanie Grobler) of the weather station there, but only found their bodies. The ship was replaced in her training role by her sister Jan van Riebeeck in 1972 and she was paid off on 27 March. Simon van der Stel was reactivated with a skeleton crew in early 1975 for a refit at Durban, but she was deemed too expensive to repair and was scrapped there by Sandock-Austral in late 1976.

== Publications ==
- Colledge, J. J.; Warlow, Ben (2006) [1969]. Ships of the Royal Navy: The Complete Record of All Fighting Ships of the Royal Navy from the 15th Century to the Present (3rd Rev ed.). London: Chatham Publishing. ISBN 978-1-86176-281-8. OCLC 67375475.
- Du Toit, Allan (1992). South Africa's Fighting Ships: Past and Present. Rivonia, South Africa: Ashanti Publishing. ISBN 1-874800-50-2.
- English, John (2008). Obdurate to Daring: British Fleet Destroyers 1941–1945. Windsor, UK: World Ship Society. ISBN 978-0-9560769-0-8.
- Hobbs, David (2011). The British Pacific Fleet: The Royal Navy's Most Powerful Strike Force. Annapolis, Maryland: Naval Institute Press. ISBN 978-1-59114-044-3.
- Lenton, H. T. (1998). British & Empire Warships of the Second World War. Annapolis, Maryland: Naval Institute Press. ISBN 1-55750-048-7.
- Raven, Alan & Roberts, John (1978). War Built Destroyers: O to Z Classes. London: Bivouac Books. ISBN 0-85680-010-4.
- Rohwer, Jürgen (2005). Chronology of the War at Sea 1939–1945: The Naval History of World War Two (Third Revised ed.). Annapolis, Maryland: Naval Institute Press. ISBN 1-59114-119-2.
- Short, Victoria L. (2020). The Forgotten British Pacific Fleet: A Stoker's Log. (the log book of Leslie Wilfred Dodge,1925-1993, a stoker on HMS Whelp).
- Whitley, M. J. (1988). Destroyers of World War 2. Annapolis, Maryland: Naval Institute Press. ISBN 0-87021-326-1.
