= Bombing of South-East Asia (1944–1945) =

1944 strategic bombing of south-east Asia

Bombardment of Southeast Asia
- Part of Pacific Theatre of World War II
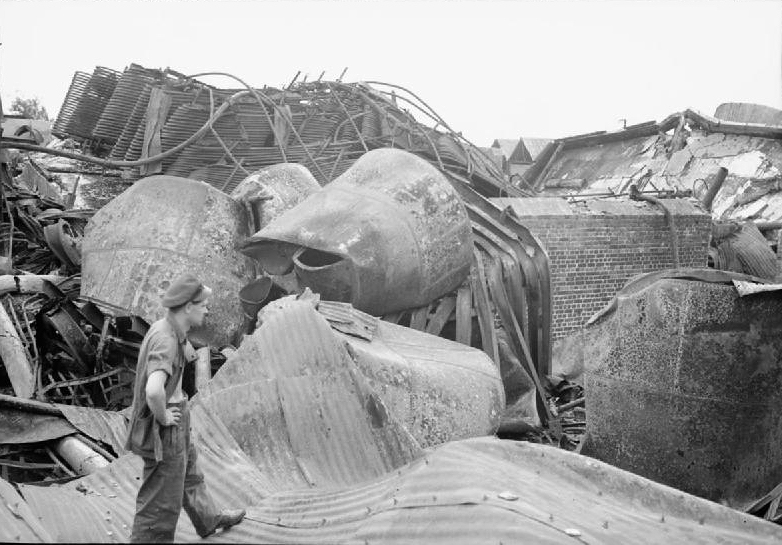
- A Royal Air Force motor transport driver surveys damage caused by Allied bombing at Singapore docks, September 1945.
Date	1944–1945
Location	Southeast Asia
Result	Allied victory

Belligerents
United Kingdom; United States; Australia; Netherlands Supported By; Free Thai Movement; China	Japan: Vietnam; Kampuchea; Luang Prabang; Malaya; Thailand; Vichy France: French Indochina

From 1944 to 1945, during the final stage of World War II, the Allies undertook the strategic bombing of South-East Asia. The main targets of Allied air raids were Thailand and Japanese-occupied Indochina.

== Royal Navy operations ==
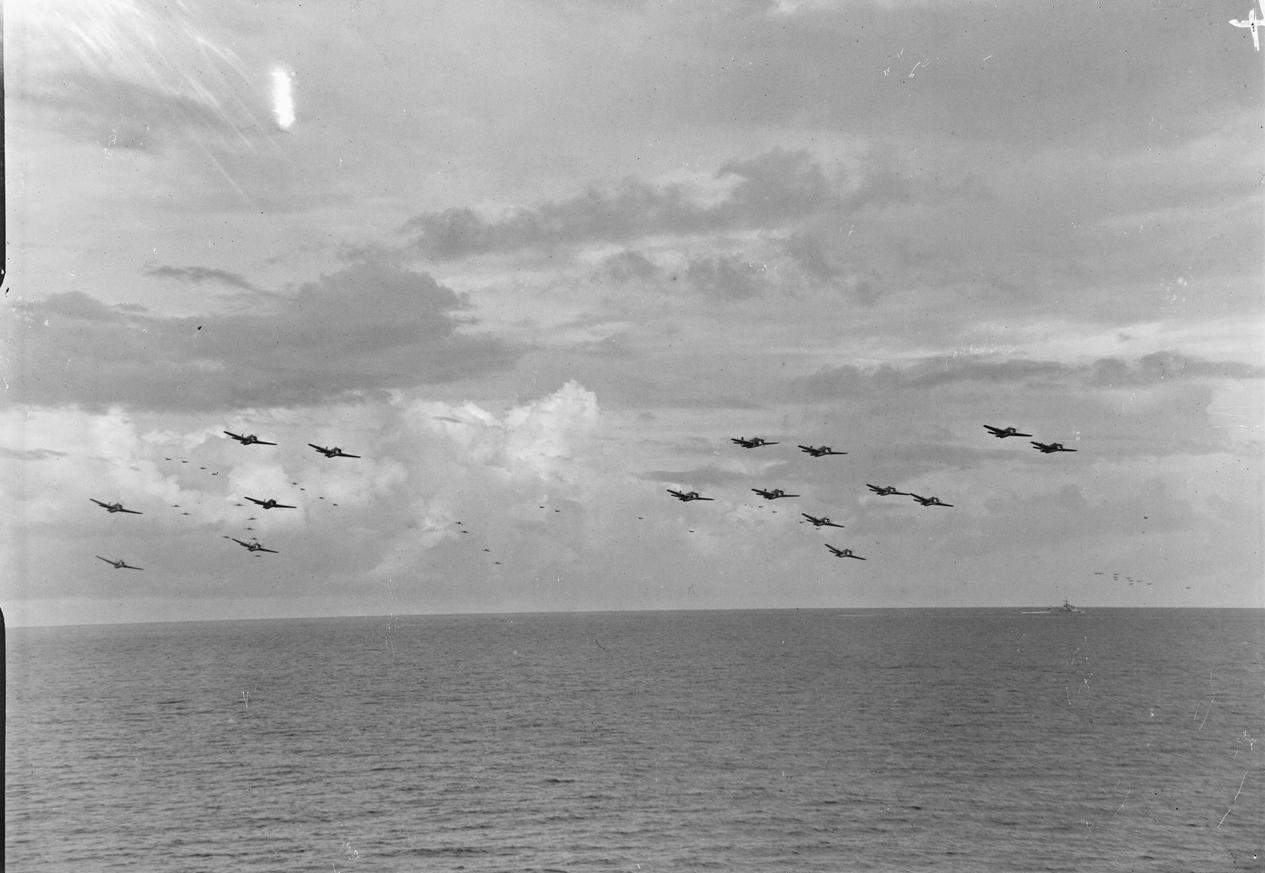
Grumman Avenger torpedo bombers from HMS Indefatigable forming up for a raid on a Japanese oil refinery at Pangkalan Brandan, Sumatra.

By 1944, the German Navy no longer presented a major threat and the Royal Navy was able to transfer major units to the Far East. This would fulfil a British wish to become involved in the Pacific War. First, however, experience was required of large-scale naval air operations and of United States procedures. To this end and to degrade Japanese capabilities, attacks were made on Indonesian oil installations, some in concert with the American carrier, USS Saratoga.

- Cockpit – BEF Sabang Raid 19/04/44
- Transom – BEF Surabaya Raid 17/05/44
- BEF Port Blair, Andaman Is. Raid 19/06/44
- Crimson – BEF Sabang Raid 25/07/44 – Somerville Force
- Mullet – Nicobar Islands Bombardment
- Robson – BPF Pangkalan Brandan Raid 20/11/44
- Lentil – Pangkalan Brandan Raid 04/01/45
- Meridian – Palembang Raid Meridian One 24/01/45, Meridian Two 29/01/45
- Sunfish – Sabang Bombardment April 1945
- Bishop – BPF Covering Operation for Rangoon Landing x Penang 15/05/45

== Indochina bombing campaign ==
Because colonial French Indochina remained loyal to the Vichy government and made numerous concessions to Japan, including allow Japanese troops, ships and airplanes to be stationed in Cochinchina, the Allies targeted industrial and military facilities in neutral Indochina beginning in 1942. In this the Allies were aided by a young French naval officer, Robert Meynier, who, beginning in May 1943, organised a network of informants in the bureaucracy of French Indochina. Before the collapse of the network in mid-1944 it managed to provide information on bombing targets, Japanese troops whereabouts and fortifications. In August 1942, the United States Fourteenth Air Force based in southern China undertook the first air raids in Indochina. In September 1943, the United States picked up the pace of the bombing, hitting the harbour of Haiphong repeatedly. By the end of 1944 the Japanese were entirely avoiding Haiphong. In late 1943 the Americans began raiding the phosphate mines at Lao Cai and Cao Bang. In all of this the air force had the help of "GBT", a multi-ethnic (and possibly Freemason) network of spies and informants working outside control of either Vichy or the Free French. In September 1944 the Americans dropped leaflets in French and Vietnamese showing pictures of the liberation of Paris, and quoting various jovial war correspondents from Europe.

Coal mined in the Hon Gai region around Haiphong, was shipped south along the coast, either by train or by junk, to be converted into charcoal gas, which was necessary to replace dwindling gasoline and petroleum supplies. The Allies targeted these shipments, putting a stop to them by the end of 1944. Besides charcoal gas, the Japanese in Indochina relied on ethanol, usually produced from rice, and on butanol as fuel for motor vehicles and aircraft, respectively. Two butanol distilleries at Cholon became the targets of airstrikes in February 1944, and the ethanol distilleries of Nam Dinh and Thanh Hoa were hit several times into March. By the summer, the United States Office of Strategic Services (OSS) was reporting increased alcohol production in the north, in Tonkin, even as the famine was spreading. In April–May, American bombers hit the spinning and weaving mills of Haiphong and Nam Dinh, although the villagers continued cloth production on hand looms in nearby villages. In May the US Army Air Forces began sending B-24 Liberators on night runs over Saigon, hitting mainly port facilities and railyards, but also some residential neighbourhoods. On 16 May an attack killed 213 civilians and injured another 843. Detailed target maps of Saigon were produced based on information obtained in April–June 1944. On 7 February 1945, a B-29 Superfortress, flying from Calcutta through cloud cover, and dropping bombs by radar, mistakenly hit a hospital and a French barracks in Saigon. Thirty Europeans and 150 Vietnamese were killed, hundreds more injured, and not one Japanese harmed.

The British intelligence mission Force 136 air-dropped several Free French operatives into Indochina in early 1945. They provided detailed information on targets to British headquarters in India and China, who transmitted them to the Americans. The French operatives were reluctant to provide information on French or Vietnamese targets, and their most important contribution was relating ship movements along the coast. American carrier aircraft sank twenty-four vessels and damaged another thirteen in January 1945. An OSS report of 19 March 1945 contains eight pages of shipping information from one anonymous French official who had contacts from Saigon in the south to Qui Nhon in the north. Another Frenchman, a civilian ship pilot working for the Japanese on the Saigon river, sent shipping information to the Americans until March, and even continued with Japanese until the war's end without being discovered.

"By July 1945, American aircraft roamed Indochina at will, bombing and strafing trains, small postal and passenger boats, government buildings, and storage facilities of any description."

As the famine spread, on 8 March 1945, General Eugène Mordant of the Corps Léger d'Intervention radioed the Free French government in Paris asking them to pressure the United States to halt bombing operations against the ports north of Vinh, in a vain effort to forestall further food shortages. The Fourteenth Air Force could not render tactical air cover to the French and Indochinese defending Lang Son from a hostile Japanese takeover on 9–10 March. After the citadel capitulated on 12 March, bombers of the Fourteenth did strike it, inadvertently killing several hundred native Vietnamese riflemen who were being interned there by the Japanese. Between 12 and 28 March, the Americans flew thirty-four bombing, strafing and reconnaissance missions over Vietnam, although the commanding general, Claire Chennault, refused to air-drop weapons in light of the confusing situation on the ground. He did, however, drop medicines.

The American bombing campaign gained intensity after the surrender of Germany and victory in Europe. On 4 July 1945 in Nam Dinh province American airplanes hit the steam launch Nam Hai, killing two and hospitalising twenty-seven (with two dying en route); five others were missing. A few days later Haiphong was struck, sinking a dredge and a floating dock. The Japanese moved their ships up the Mekong river from Saigon and Cap St Jacques (now Vung Tau). The United States also dropped leaflets in French, Vietnamese and Japanese, and some were bilingual. They warned people to stay away from railroads, bridges and ferries, and cautioned them against helping the Japanese to repair bomb damage: "Our airplanes will come again, and if you are near the target you will probably be killed by association." After the victory over Japan, on 19 August the denizens of Hanoi broke into the streets and removed the black coverings of the street lamps.

== Thailand bombing campaign ==
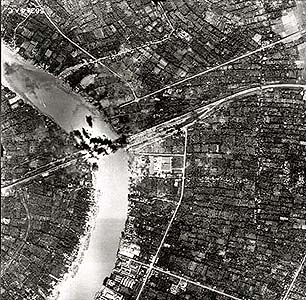
Bombing of Rama VI Bridge

Although Thailand declared war on both the United States and the United Kingdom, the former chose to treat the declaration as made under duress on account of the Japanese invasion and hence null. The British accepted the declaration and considered Thailand an enemy. According to a report of December 1945, the Allies dropped 18,583 bombs on Thailand, resulting in the death of 8,711 people and the destruction of 9,616 buildings, 617 trucks, 73 locomotives and 173 other vehicles. A further 1,194 buildings were damaged. The prime target of the campaign was Bangkok, the Thai capital. Rural areas were almost entirely unaffected.

In October 1944 the British reported that they were receiving "high grade intelligence" from Thailand concerning bombing targets and the results of their bombing raids. The United States Office of Strategic Services (OSS) had a mission in Thailand supporting the Free Thai movement. Frequent messages were sent by OSS officers on the ground to South East Asia Command (SEAC) imploring more discriminate target selection in Thailand, but the OSS had little influence on the air force.

A strafing run of 5 March 1945 on the Bangkok Noi railway station in Thonburi resulted in 78 civilian fatalities and damage to the house of the Thai politician Pridi Banomyong, an important American ally. On 22 March a train carrying Thai soldiers was hit outside of Paknampo, although Free Thai allies had urged that the railway line not be targeted because the troops being transferred might be useful in the north in the event of a Thai–Japanese break. Another "indiscriminate bombing and strafing" of a railroad killed 400 civilians and 50 Thai soldiers on 2 April. On 7 April, American airplanes attacked Don Muang airfield, destroying several craft of the Thai Air Force, including two that had just landed with the commander of the Phayap Army, the Thai force then occupying part of Burma. During this raid, three Americans—Captain Abrahams, Lieutenant Mackenzie and Lieutenant Wimer—had to bail out of their aircraft and were captured by the Thais.

On 14 April 1945, the American and British B-24 Liberators raided Bangkok from 3:00 p.m. to 5:00 p.m., knocking out the Samsen power plant and damaging the city's only other one. Bangkok was left mostly without power or running water, and 200 civilians were killed. On 18 April, the Allies raided Bangkok again, striking the wharves of the Borneo Company, two of which burned for at least two more days. On 10 July eight B-24s of the Royal Air Force killed 90 and injured 400 in a raid on Bangkok. On 13 July Pridi Banomyong requested a halt to Allied bombing, urging leaflet drops instead. On 14 July, the Bangkok terminus railway station was bombed. On 29 July the Royal Air Force bombed the Bangkok Noi railway station, although they missed the station itself and one bomb landed on the campus of Thammasat University. Thammasat—which had held foreign internees until its evacuation after the 5 March bombing—was not the only university affected: Chulalongkorn University had to suspend classes by January 1945 on account of the bombing. A SEAC report of 27 July concluded that an interruption to the bombing campaign prompted by Free Thai complaints only encouraged the Japanese, who knew about Allied contact with Thai elements, to pressure the Thais in request a halt to the bombing.

== See also ==
- Bombing of Singapore (1944–1945)
- Raid on Taipei
