= Operation Lentil =

Operation Lentil may refer to:

- Operation Lentil (Caucasus), deportation of populations by Soviet Union
- Operation Lentil (Sumatra), British naval air attack on Japanese installations
