= HMS Wessex (R78) =

W-class destroyer built for the Royal Navy during World War II

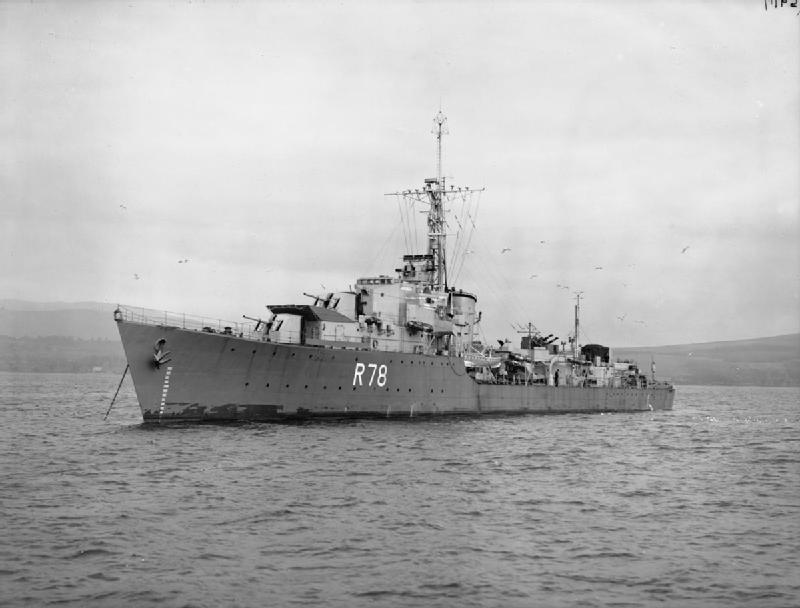
- Wessex at anchor, 10 May 1944

History

United Kingdom
- Name: Wessex
- Ordered: 3 December 1941
- Builder: Fairfield Shipbuilding and Engineering Company, Govan
- Laid down: 25 October 1942
- Launched: 2 September 1943
- Commissioned: 11 May 1944
- Decommissioned: 14 March 1946
- Fate: Sold to South African Navy, 29 March 1950

South Africa
- Name: SAS Jan van Riebeeck
- Namesake: Jan van Riebeeck
- Acquired: 29 March 1950
- Commissioned: 29 March 1950
- Out of service: Late 1975
- Reclassified: Converted into an anti-submarine frigate, 1964–66
- Nickname(s): JVR
- Fate: Sunk as target, 25 March 1980

General characteristics (as built)
- Class & type: W-class destroyer
- Displacement: 1,710 long tons (1,740 t) (standard load); 2,530 long tons (2,570 t) (deep load)
- Length: 362 ft 9 in (110.6 m)
- Beam: 35 ft 8 in (10.9 m)
- Draught: 14 ft 6 in (4.4 m) (deep load)
- Installed power: 2 Admiralty 3-drum boilers; 40,000 shp (30,000 kW)
- Propulsion: 2 shafts; 2 × geared steam turbines
- Speed: 36 knots (67 km/h; 41 mph)
- Range: 4,675 nmi (8,658 km; 5,380 mi) at 20 knots (37 km/h; 23 mph)
- Complement: 179
- Sensors & processing systems: ASDIC; Type 272 surface-search radar; Type 282 and 285 gunnery radars; Type 291 early-warning radar
- Armament: 4 × single 4.7-inch (120 mm) guns; 1 × quadruple 2-pounder (40 mm) "pom-pom" AA gun; 4 × twin Oerlikon 20 mm (0.8 in) AA guns; 2 × quadruple 21 inch (533 mm) torpedo tubes; 70 depth charges; 4 throwers, 2 rails

HMS Wessex (pennant number: R78) was one of eight W-class destroyers built for the Royal Navy during World War II. Completed in 1944, the ship spent most of the war assigned to the Eastern and Pacific Fleets. She screened British aircraft carriers as their aircraft attacked targets in the Japanese-occupied Nicobar Islands, the Dutch East Indies and Okinawa.

Wessex was then reduced to reserve after arriving home in December 1945. She was then transferred to Simon's Town, South Africa in 1947, to form the South Atlantic Reserve Force. The ship was purchased by the South African Navy in 1950 and renamed HMSAS Jan van Riebeeck. She was placed in reserve in 1953 and continuing shortages of manpower kept the ship in reserve for most of the rest of her career even though she was converted into a fast anti-submarine frigate in 1964–66. Jan van Riebeeck was converted to serve as a training ship in 1971–72 and remained in that role until she was decommissioned in 1975. The ship was sunk as a target in 1980.

== Description ==
The W-class ships displaced 1,710 long tons (1,740 t) at standard load and 2,530 long tons (2,570 t) at deep load. They had an overall length of 362 feet 9 inches (110.6 m), a beam of 35 feet 8 inches (10.9 m) and a mean deep draught of 14 feet 6 inches (4.4 m). The ships were powered by a pair of Parsons geared steam turbines, each driving one propeller shaft, using steam provided by two Admiralty three-drum boilers. The turbines developed a total of 40,000 shaft horsepower (30,000 kW) which gave a maximum speed of 36 knots (67 km/h; 41 mph). They carried 615 long tons (625 t) of fuel oil that gave them a range of 4,675 nautical miles (8,658 km; 5,380 mi) at 20 knots (37 km/h; 23 mph). Their crew numbered 179 officers and ratings.

The W-class destroyers were armed with four single 4.7-inch (120 mm) Mark IX guns, one quadruple mount for 2-pounder (40 mm) Mk II "pom-pom" anti-aircraft (AA) guns and eight Oerlikon 20-millimetre (0.8 in) light AA guns on twin mounts. They also were equipped with two quadruple mounts for 21 inch (533 mm) torpedo tubes. For anti-submarine work, the ships were fitted with ASDIC and two rails and four throwers for 70 depth charges. They were equipped with a Type 272 surface-search radar, Type 282 and 285 gunnery radars and a Type 291 early-warning radar.

To better defend the ship against Japanese kamikaze suicide aircraft, Wessex had her searchlight replaced by a 40 mm (1.6 in) Bofors AA gun in mid-1944. As part of her 1964–66 refit, the ship's aft torpedo tubes were removed to make room for a small flight deck and hangar for two Westland Wasp helicopters and a pair of American Mk 32 triple-barrelled anti-submarine torpedo tubes were added, one on each side of the hangar. The guns were replaced by two twin-gun turrets fitted with 4-inch (102 mm) Mk XVI guns, one forward of the bridge and the other aft of the hangar. Her electronics were modernized as well although she retained the existing search radar. The changes increased her crew to 186–210 officers and ratings.

== Construction and career ==
Wessex was ordered from Fairfield Shipbuilding and Engineering Company on 3 December 1941 under the name of Zenith and was laid down at their Govan, Scotland, shipyard on 20 October 1942. She was renamed in January 1943 and was launched on 2 October 1943. Completed on 11 May 1944, the ship was assigned to the Eastern Fleet in the Indian Ocean and escorted the aircraft carriers Indomitable and Victorious while their aircraft attacked Nancowry harbour and other targets in the Nicobar Islands as part of Operation Millet, 15–19 October. During Operation Robson, an aerial attack on the oil refinery complex at Pangkalan Brandan, Sumatra, on 17–22 December, Wessex escorted the main body of the fleet. The ship did much the same during Operation Meridian, multiple aerial attacks on the refineries in Sumatra 16–29 January 1945, although she was held back to pick up radar spare parts and did not rendezvous with the fleet until the 19th.

Now part of the British Pacific Fleet, Wessex continued to escort ships and screen operations during the Battle of Okinawa until she began a refit at Auckland that lasted from 5 July to 27 August. The ship rejoined the fleet in September and ferried Allied prisoners of war back home. She arrived at Devonport on 28 December and was reduced to Category B Reserve on 14 March 1946 after being refitted in January–February. Wessex was recommissioned on 28 August 1947 and was refitted at Portsmouth Royal Dockyard in August–September in preparation for the voyage to South Africa in company with her sister ships, Kempenfelt, Whelp and Wrangler. Upon arrival, they formed the South Atlantic Reserve Force in Simon's Town.

Wessex was sold to the South African Navy on 29 March 1950 for £450,000 and commissioned that day as Jan van Riebeeck. Two years later she participated in Cape Town's celebration of the 300th anniversary of its founding by her namesake in April 1952. Later that year, the ship visited ports in French Madagascar and British East Africa. Jan van Riebeeck was placed in reserve in early 1953 to allow the navy to man her newly purchased sister ship, HMSAS Simon van der Stel. She remained in reserve for nearly 20 years, despite her conversion into a Type 16 frigate between 1964 and 1966. Jan van Riebeeck began a refit in March 1971 to prepare her to replace her sister as a training ship that was completed on 12 April 1972 when she was recommissioned. The ship was reduced to reserve again in late 1975 and Jan van Riebeeck was sunk as a target on 25 March 1980, 60 nautical miles (110 km; 69 mi) south of Cape Town. The hulk was initially struck by a Skerpioen missile fired by the fast attack craft SAS Jim Fouché from over the horizon, but had to be finished off by gunfire.
