= South-East Asian theatre of World War II =

Campaigns of the Pacific War in Southeast Asia

South-East Asian Theatre
- Part of the Pacific Theatre of World War II
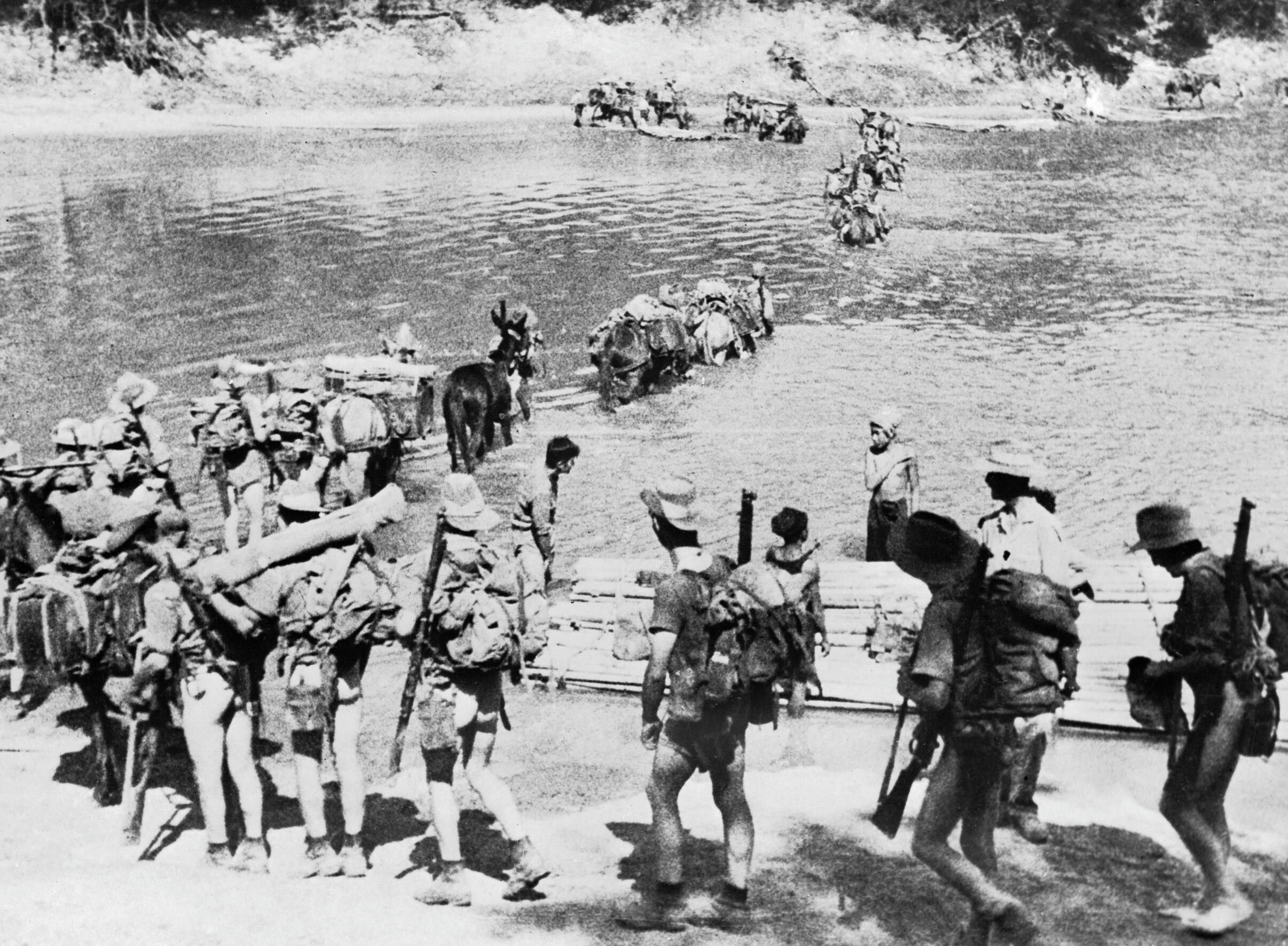
- A Chindit column crosses a river in Burma, 1943
Date	8 December 1941 – 2 September 1945 (3 years, 9 months and 1 day)
Location	Philippines, Thailand, Indochina, Dutch East Indies, Burma, India, Malaya, Singapore, Ceylon, Hong Kong
Result	Allied victory

Belligerents
Allies; United States: Philippine Commonwealth; United Kingdom and Empire: India; Australia; Canada; New Zealand; Kenya; Nigeria; Gold Coast; Straits Settlements; Malaya; Sarawak; North Borneo; Brunei; Hong Kong; Singapore; Burma; Ceylon; Gilbert and Ellice Islands; Solomon Islands; Fiji; Tonga; Nepal Netherlands: Dutch East Indies; China (Provisional Government of the Republic of Korea) Korean Liberation Army	Axis; Japan: Philippine Republic; (Myanmar) State of Burma; Vietnam; Kampuchea; Luang Prabang; Indonesian National Party; Azad Hind; Thailand Vichy France: French Indochina

Commanders and leaders
(United States) Douglas MacArthur; (Republic of China (1912–1949)) Chiang Kai-Shek; (United Kingdom) Louis Mountbatten; (United Kingdom) Arthur Percival; (United Kingdom) Archibald Wavell	(Empire of Japan) Hisaichi Terauchi; (Thailand) Plaek Phibunsongkhram; (Azad Hind) Subhas Chandra Bose

Strength
341,400; 33 warships 41 submarines 492 planes 20 tanks	582,700; 70 warships 18 submarines 708 planes 134 tanks

Casualties and losses
284,900 casualties: 202,700 captured	222,000 casualties

The South-East Asian Theatre of World War II consisted of the campaigns of the Pacific War in the Philippines, Thailand, Indonesia, Indochina, Burma, India, Malaya, and Singapore between 1941 and 1945.

Japan attacked British and American territories with near-simultaneous offensives against Southeast Asia and the Central Pacific on 7/8 December 1941. Action in this theatre ended when Japan announced an intent to surrender on 15 August 1945. The formal surrender of Japan ceremony took place on 2 September 1945.

== History ==
=== Outbreak of hostilities ===
Conflict in this theatre began when Japan invaded French Indochina in September 1940 and rose to a new level following the Attack on Pearl Harbor, and simultaneous attacks on the Philippines, Hong Kong, Thailand, Singapore and Malaya on 7 and 8 December 1941. The main landing at Singora (now Songkhla) on the east side of the Isthmus of Kra preceded the bombing of Pearl Harbor by several hours.

Although Japan declared war on the United States and the British Empire, the declaration was not delivered until after the attacks began. On 8 December, the United Kingdom, (Note: See United Kingdom declaration of war on Japan.) the United States, (Note: See United States declaration of war on Japan.) Canada, and the Netherlands declared war on Japan, followed by China and Australia the next day.

=== Initial Japanese successes ===
The Allies suffered many defeats in the first half of the war. Two major British warships, HMS Repulse and HMS Prince of Wales were sunk by a Japanese air attack off Malaya on 10 December 1941. Following the invasion, the government of Thailand formally allied itself with Japan on 21 December. Japan invaded Hong Kong in the Battle of Hong Kong on 8 December, culminating in surrender on 25 December. January saw the invasions of Burma and the Dutch East Indies and the capture of Manila and Kuala Lumpur.

==== Malaya and Singapore ====
Japanese forces met stiff resistance from III Corps of the Indian Army, the Australian 8th Division, and British units during the Battle of Malaya, but Japan's superiority in air power, tanks and infantry tactics drove the Allied units back. After being driven out of Malaya by the end of January 1942, Allied forces in Singapore, under the command of Lieutenant General Arthur Percival, surrendered to the Japanese on 15 February 1942; about 130,000 Allied troops became prisoners of war. The fall of Singapore was the largest surrender in British military history.

==== The Japanese Indian Ocean raid ====
The Japanese Indian Ocean raid was a naval sortie by the Fast Carrier Strike Force (Kidō Butai ) of the Imperial Japanese Navy from 31 March to 10 April 1942 against Allied shipping and bases in the Indian Ocean. Following the destruction of the ABDACOM forces in the battles around Java in February and March, the Japanese sortied into the Indian Ocean to destroy British seapower there and support the invasion of Burma. The raid was only partially successful. It did not succeed in destroying Allied naval power in the Indian Ocean but it did force the British fleet to relocate from British Ceylon to Kilindini at Mombasa in Kenya, as their more forward fleet anchorages could not be adequately protected from Japanese attack. The fleet in the Indian Ocean was then gradually reduced to little more than a convoy escort force as other commitments called for the more powerful ships. From May 1942, it was also used in the invasion of Madagascar — an operation aimed at thwarting any attempt by Japan to use bases on the Vichy French controlled territory.

In 1942, Madras City was attacked by a Mitsubishi Rufe, (the Zero's seaplane version) operating from the carrier Ryūjō which dropped a single bomb near the St. George Fort. The physical damage was negligible, though the public response was major and the city was evacuated because of fears of subsequent Japanese bombing and invasion. Many rich families from Madras moved permanently to the hill stations in fear.

Also in 1942 in preparation for a possible Japanese invasion of India, the British began improvements to the Kodaikanal-Munnar Road to facilitate its use as an evacuation route from Kodaikanal along the southern crest of the Palani Hills to Top Station. Existing roads then continued to Munnar and down to Cochin where British ships would be available for evacuation out of India.

=== Japanese occupation of the Andaman and Nicobar Islands ===
The Andaman and Nicobar Islands (8,293 km^{2} on 139 islands) are a group of islands situated in the Bay of Bengal at about 780 miles from Kolkata (known at the time as Calcutta), 740 miles from Chennai (known at the time as Madras) and 120 miles from Cape Nargis in Burma. On 23 March 1942 a Japanese invasion force seized the islands and occupied them until the end of the war.

On 29 December 1943, political control of the islands was theoretically passed to the Azad Hind government of Subhas Chandra Bose. Bose visited Port Blair to raise the tricolour flag of the Indian National Army. After Bose's departure the Japanese remained in effective control of the Andamans, and the sovereignty of the Arzi Hukumat-e Hind was largely fictional. The islands themselves were renamed "Shaheed" and "Swaraj", meaning "martyr" and "self-rule" respectively. Bose placed the islands under the governorship of Lt Col. A. D. Loganathan, and had limited involvement with the administration of the territory.

=== Burma Campaign ===
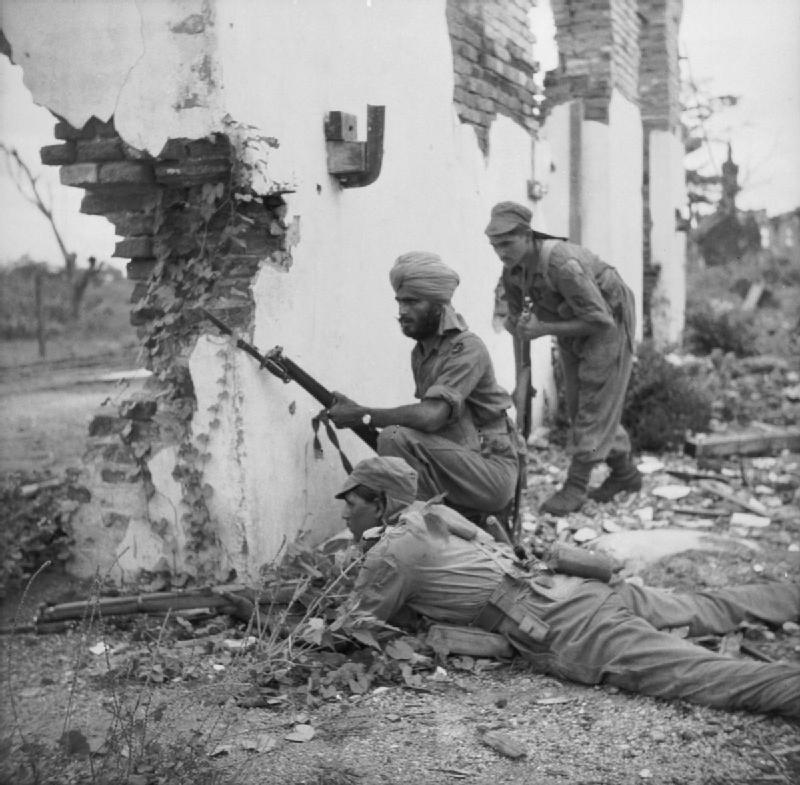
The 20th Indian Infantry Division search for Japanese in Prome, Burma, 3 May 1945.

- The retreat of the Burma Corps
- The formation of the British Fourteenth Army (The "Forgotten Army")
- The Arakan Campaign
- The Japanese attack on India
- The Allied counter offensives
  - Road to Rangoon
  - Brigadier Orde Wingate and the Chindits

==== US forces in the China Burma India Theatre ====
- Northern Combat Area Command (NCAC)
- Flying Tigers
- Fourteenth Air Force
- Tenth Air Force
- Twentieth Air Force (Operation Matterhorn)
- The Allied logistical airlift from India into China over the Hump
- The Ledo Road
- Merrill's Marauders

One of the major logistical efforts of the war was "flying the Hump" over the Himalayas and the building of the Ledo Road from India to China as a replacement for the Burma Road.

=== Air war in South East Asia ===
- RAF Far East Air Force
- RAF Third Tactical Air Force
- Bombing of South-East Asia (1944–45)

RAF battle honours:

- CEYLON 1942

Qualification: For operations against Japanese aircraft and naval units by squadrons based in Ceylon during the Japanese attacks of April 1942.

- BURMA 1944–1945

Qualification: For operations during the 14th Army's advance from Imphal to Rangoon, the coastal amphibious assaults, and the Battle of Pegu Yomas, August 1944 to August 1945.

=== Indian Ocean naval campaigns 1942–1945 ===
The earliest successes were gained by mine laying and submarine warfare. The Japanese minesweeping capability was never great, and when confronted with new types of mines they did not adapt quickly. Japanese shipping was driven from the Burmese coast using this type of warfare. British submarines based in British Ceylon operated against Japanese shipping.

It was only after the war in Europe was clearly coming to an end that large British forces were dispatched to the Indian Ocean again. Following the neutralisation of the German fleet in late 1943 and early 1944, forces from the Home Fleet were released, and the success of Operation Overlord in June meant even more craft could be sent, including precious amphibious assault shipping.

During late 1944, as more British aircraft carriers came into the area a series of strikes were flown against oil targets in Sumatra, such as Operation Meridian. USS Saratoga was lent for the first attack by the United States. The oil installations were heavily damaged by the attacks, aggravating the Japanese fuel shortages due to the American blockade. The final attack was flown as the carriers were heading for Sydney to become the British Pacific Fleet.

After the departure of the main battle forces the Indian Ocean was left with escort carriers and older battleships as the mainstay of its naval forces. Nevertheless, during those months important operations were launched in the recapture of Burma, including landings on Ramree and Akyab and near Rangoon.

== Commands ==
=== Allied ===
At the start of the war the British forces in the area fell under at least three separate commands. General Sir Archibald Wavell, the Commander-in-Chief, India, directed the British and Indian Armies in India and Burma. Vice Admiral Sir Ralph Leatham, the Commander-in-Chief, East Indies, directed the Royal Navy's East Indies Station and the Royal Indian Navy. In November 1940 the Far East Command was established under Air Chief Marshal Robert Brooke-Popham based in Singapore. From 23 December 1941, Far East Command was commanded by Lieutenant-General Sir Henry Royds Pownall. Far East Command was responsible for Hong Kong, Malaya, Singapore and other British Far East possessions, and took over responsibility for Burma. It was responsible for military and air, but not naval, forces.

A month after the outbreak of war with Japan on 7 December 1941, the Allied governments jointly appointed General Wavell as Supreme Allied Commander of all "American-British-Dutch-Australian" (ABDA) forces in South East Asia and the Pacific, from Burma to the Dutch East Indies.

However, advances made by the Japanese over the next month split the ABDA forces in two. On 23 February 1942, with Malaya lost and the Allied position in Java and Sumatra precarious, ABDACOM was closed down and its headquarters in Java evacuated. Wavell returned to India to resume his position as C-in-C India where his responsibilities now included the defence of Burma. Burma (Burma Command and RAF forces there) had been included in Far East Command; reverted to direction by India; transferred to ABDA, but with India remaining responsible for administration; and then finally reverted back to command from India.

Dutch resistance to the Japanese in Java ceased on 8-9 March 1942. On 30 March 1942, the Joint Chiefs of Staff in Washington divided the Pacific theatre into three areas: the Pacific Ocean Areas (POA), under Admiral Chester Nimitz; the Southwest Pacific Area (SWPA), under MacArthur as Supreme Allied Commander South West Pacific; and the Southeast Pacific Area. McArthur took up his Supreme Commander's post on 18 April. SWPA was given responsibility for the Philippines, Java, Borneo, and all the water areas of the South China Sea.

Malaya, French Indochina, and Thailand remained a British responsibility and operations were to be directed from India. General Wavell was made Viceroy of India and General Claude Auchinleck became Commander-in-Chief, India, on 20 June 1943.

In August 1943 the Allies formed a new South East Asian Command to take over strategic responsibilities for the theatre. The reorganisation of the theatre command took about two months. On 4 October Winston Churchill appointed Admiral Lord Louis Mountbatten supreme Allied commander of the South East Asia Command (SEAC). The American General Joseph Stilwell was the first deputy supreme Allied commander. On 15 November, Auchinleck handed over responsibility for the conduct of operations against the Japanese in the theatre to Mountbatten.

The initial land forces operational area for SEAC included India, Burma, British Ceylon and Malaya. Operations were also mounted in Japanese-occupied Sumatra, Thailand and French Indochina (Vietnam, Cambodia, and Laos).

Initially SEAC commanded:

- British Eastern Fleet (based in Ceylon)
- British 11th Army Group (Commonwealth land forces; HQ in New Delhi). Directed British Fourteenth Army; British Army in Ceylon (Ceylon Army); and theoretically, Northern Combat Area Command under the command of Joseph Stilwell.
- Air HQ India (New Delhi)
- China Burma India Theater (CBI), (all US forces in theatre; HQ in New Delhi).

In October 1944, CBI was split into US Forces China Theater (USFCT) and India-Burma Theater (USFIBT).

On 12 November 1944 Eleventh Army Group was redesignated by Allied Land Forces South East Asia (ALFSEA) still under SEAC, as it was felt that an inter-Allied command was better than the purely British headquarters. Command problems with General Stilwell and his interactions with the U.S. Joint Chiefs of Staff had precipitated the change. It combined Commonwealth and US forces, with its headquarters at Kandy. On 1 December ALFSEA HQ moved to Barrackpore, India.

On 15 August 1945 responsibility for the rest of the Dutch East Indies was transferred from the South West Pacific Area to SEAC.

SEAC was disbanded on 30 November 1946.

=== Japanese ===
The Imperial Japanese Army Unit controlling all army land and air units in South East Asia and the South West Pacific was the Southern Expeditionary Army headquartered in Saigon, Indochina. It was commanded by General Count Hisaichi Terauchi, who commanded it from 1941 to 1945. The Japanese also deployed the South Seas Force, a combined force of Army and Special Naval Landing Force personnel. The Southern Army's major field commands were the 14th Army, the 15th Army, the 16th Army and the 25th Army. These consisted of 11 infantry divisions, six independent infantry brigades, and six tank regiments, plus artillery and support troops. The Japanese extensively used bicycle infantry, which allowed them quick movement over vast distances.

== Campaigns and battles ==
- French Indochina (Pre-1941 to 1945)
  - Japanese invasion of French Indochina
  - Franco-Thai War
    - Battle of Ko Chang
  - Japanese coup d'état in French Indochina
  - August Revolution
- Thailand
  - Japanese invasion of Thailand
  - Bombing of Bangkok
- Malayan campaign (December 1941 – February 1942)
  - Japanese invasion of Malaya
  - Japanese bombing of Singapore
  - Operation Krohcol
  - Sinking of Prince of Wales and Repulse
  - Battle of Jitra
  - Battle of Gurun
  - Battle of Kampar
  - Battle of Slim River
  - Battle of Gemas
  - Battle of Muar
    - Parit Sulong Massacre
  - Battle off Endau
  - Battle of Singapore
- Burma campaign (1941–1945)
  - Japanese invasion of Burma (1941–1942)
    - Battle of Bilin River
    - Battle of Sittang Bridge
    - Battle of Pegu
    - Battle of Taukkyan Roadblock
    - Battle of Shwedaung
    - Battle of Prome
    - Battle of Yenangyaung
  - Burma campaign (1942–1943)
    - First Arakan Campaign
    - Operation Longcloth
  - Burma campaign (1944)
    - Battle of the Admin Box
    - Operation Thursday
      - Battle of Mogaung
    - Operation U-Go
      - Battle of Sangshak
      - Battle of Imphal
      - Battle of the Tennis Court
      - Battle of Kohima
    - Siege of Myitkyina
  - Burma campaign (1944–1945)
    - Battle of Hill 170
    - Battle of Ramree Island
    - Battle of Meiktila and Mandalay
    - Battle of Pakokku
    - Battle of Tanlwe Chaung
    - Operation Dracula
    - Battle of Elephant Point
    - Battle of the Sittang Bend

== See also ==
- Burma National Army
- Thai Phayap Army
- Korean Liberation Army
- Military history of Britain during World War II#The Far East
- Second Sino-Japanese War
- Kantogun
