= Roy Halliday =

British naval pilot (1923–2007)

Vice-Admiral Sir Roy Halliday KBE DSC
- Born: 27 June 1923
- Died: 23 November 2007 (aged 84); Bank, near Lyndhurst, Hampshire
- Military career
- Allegiance: United Kingdom
- Branch: Royal Navy
- Service years: 1941–1981
- Rank: Vice-Admiral
- Nickname: "Gus"
- Commands: 3rd Destroyer Squadron; Commander (Air), HMS Albion; HMS Diligence; 813 Naval Air Squadron
- Conflicts: Second World War
- Awards: Knight Commander of the Order of the British Empire; Distinguished Service Cross; Mentioned in Despatches
- Other work: Chairman of Trustees of the Burma Star Association; Chairman of the British Military Power Boat Trust

Vice-Admiral Sir Roy William "Gus" Halliday, KBE, DSC (27 June 1923 – 23 November 2007) was a British naval pilot who saw service in the Second World War, in the British Pacific Fleet and subsequently became Director-General Intelligence in Britain's Defence Intelligence Staff from 1981 to 1984.

== War service ==
Halliday studied at William Ellis School and University College School before volunteering in 1939 for the Royal Navy. While he awaited his call-up papers, he worked as a trawler deck-hand on Breadwinner, out of Lowestoft. Initially entering service in 1941 as a naval rating at HMS Royal Arthur at Skegness, Halliday was offered a commission as an officer in the Royal Naval Volunteer Reserve and training as a naval airman. His air training took place in the United States (still formally neutral at that time) at the naval air station at Grosse Ile, near Detroit and at Pensacola, Florida. After qualifying, he was posted to a squadron of Grumman Avengers, aboard the escort carrier HMS Chaser in the Gulf of Mexico.

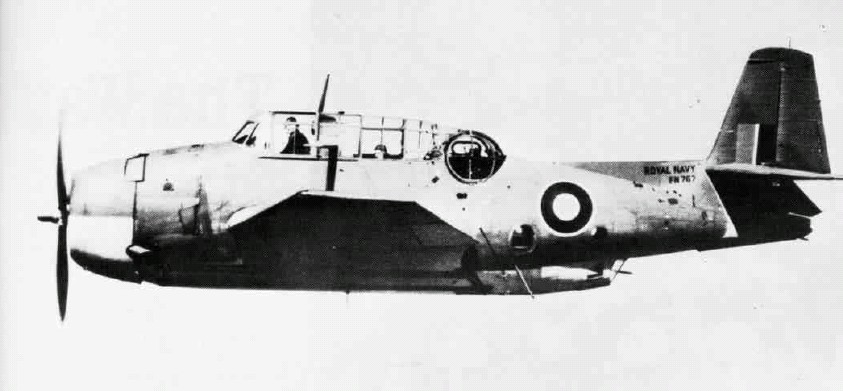
Fleet Air Arm Avenger

After three months period on anti-submarine patrols in the north Atlantic, Halliday was posted to a shore station, RNAS Hatston in Orkney, guarding against sorties by German warships. In late 1943, Halliday's squadron was embarked on HMS Illustrious; they sailed for the Far East, arriving at Ceylon (now Sri Lanka) in January 1944. There were air raids on Japanese installations and in support of 14th Army operations.

Halliday had transferred to HMS Victorious by the time of the Meridian air raids by the British Pacific Fleet on oil refineries near Palembang on 24 January. Halliday's aircraft was shot up during the raid and he was obliged to "ditch" his burning aircraft in the sea; he was rescued by HMS Whelp. Whelp's first lieutenant, Prince Philip of Greece and Denmark, lent Halliday a spare uniform and subsequently accompanied him on a "run ashore" in Fremantle.

Halliday was back on Victorious in time to take part in the raids on the airfields on the Sakishima Islands in March to May 1945, for his efforts, he was awarded a DSC in addition to the Mention in Dispatches earned during Operation Meridian.

After the Japanese surrender, Halliday learned that his cabin-mate, Ken Burrenston, who had been shot down over Palembang, had been beheaded by the Japanese at Changi, two days after the Japanese surrender.

== Post-war ==
Halliday returned to Britain on the troopship Rangitiki with his squadron commander, David Foster, who subsequently became president of Colgate-Palmolive. On return to the UK, he was offered, and accepted, a permanent commission in the Royal Navy (16 March 1946) and took up a post as a test pilot at Boscombe Down. There followed several postings to naval units: commander of 813 Naval Air Squadron on HMS Eagle; commander of HMS Diligence (a base at Hythe, Hampshire); senior officer of the 104th Minesweeping Squadron in the Far East. The 104th swept left-over Japanese mines in the Celebes Sea and chased pirates, who desisted once the ready use of capital punishment by the civil authorities became known.

The next appointment was for two years as naval assistant to the Chief of Naval Information at the Admiralty. During this time, Halliday closed down a leak of information to the press. Another sea posting ensued in 1964, as second in command of commando carrier HMS Albion and commander of its air operations, for which he learnt to fly helicopters. Albion was a busy posting, supporting operations in the Radfan and Aden and in Borneo during the Indonesian Confrontation.

Halliday was appointed Deputy Director Naval Air Warfare in 1966, Captain Far East Fleet and Western Fleet in 1970 and Commodore Amphibious Warfare in 1971. He went on to be Commodore Intelligence in 1973, Naval Attaché and Commander of the British Navy Staff in Washington D. C. in 1975 and was promoted to vice-admiral on 14 March 1978, as he became Deputy Chief of Defence Staff (Intelligence). He was appointed a Knight Commander of the Order of the British Empire (KBE) in the 1980 Birthday Honours, and retired in 1981.

In retirement Halliday served as Director-General Intelligence at the Ministry of Defence from 1981 to 1984.

Military offices
| Preceded by Sir Richard Wakeford | Deputy Chief of Defence Staff (Intelligence); 1978–1981 | Succeeded by Sir James Glover |
Government offices
| Preceded by Sir John Aiken | Director-General Intelligence; 1981–1984 | Post disbanded |
