= Operation Lentil (Sumatra) =

British naval air attack on Japanese installations

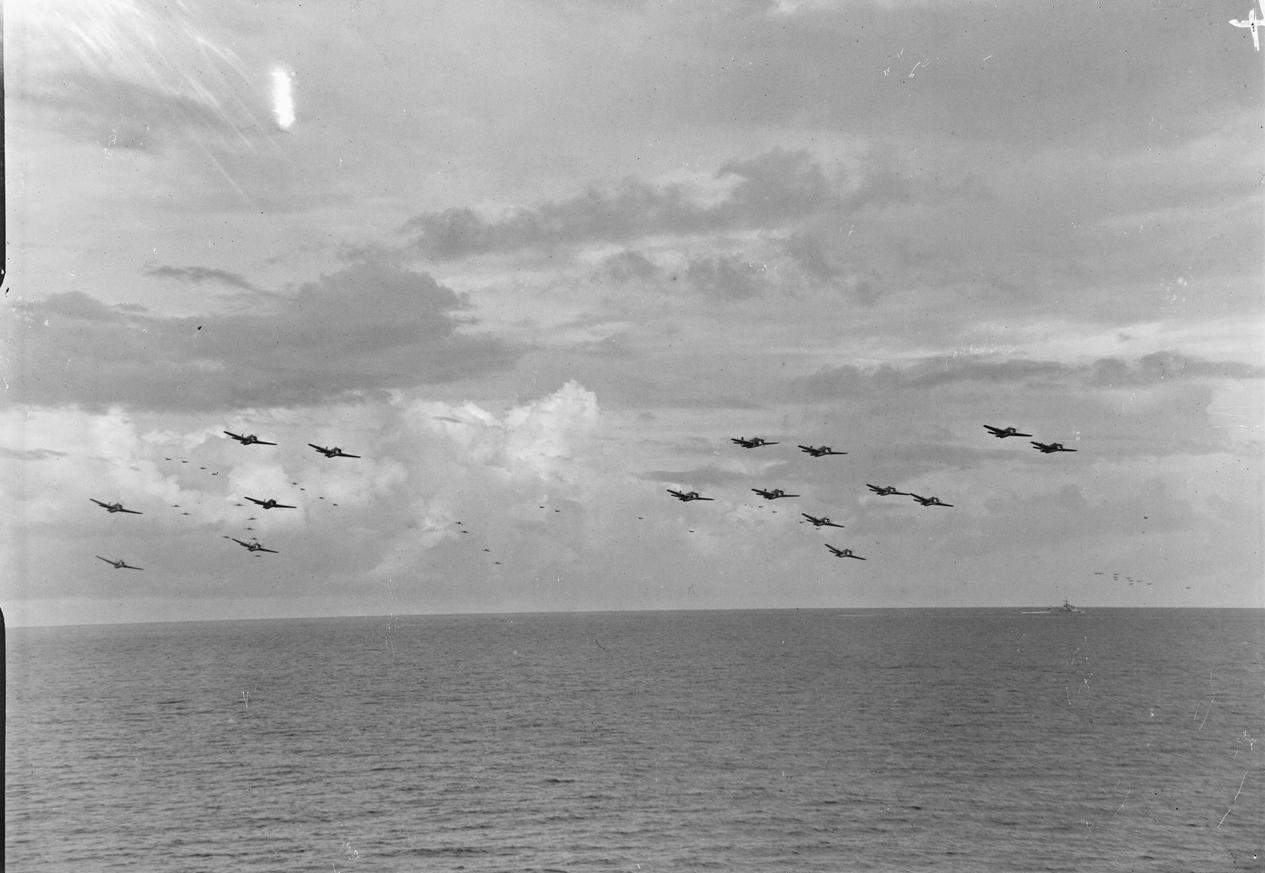
Grumman Avenger torpedo bombers from HMS Indefatigable forming up for a raid on a Japanese oil refinery at Pangkalan Brandan during Lentil.

Operation Lentil (Sumatra) was an air raid by British carrier-based aircraft on oil installations at Pangkalan Brandan, an important centre for Indonesian oil production on Sumatra on 4 January 1945. It was part of the larger Operation Outflank, and its aim was to disrupt fuel supplies to Japanese forces in the Pacific.

== Attacking force ==
The attack was done under the command of then Rear-Admiral Philip Vian, who was in charge of the British Pacific Fleet's air operations. Three aircraft carriers, HMS Indomitable HMS Indefatigable and HMS Victorious, escorted by four cruisers (HMS Suffolk, Ceylon, Argonaut and Black Prince) and eight destroyers, including the 25th Flotilla (Grenville (leader), Ursa, Undaunted, Undine) and the 27th Flotilla (Kempenfelt (leader), Whelp, and Wager), attacked Pangkalan Brandan and succeeded in causing considerable damage: the attack aircraft badly damaged the refinery, and the fighters shot down about 12 Japanese aircraft as well as destroying another 20 on the ground. The British lost only one aircraft, an Avenger whose crew was rescued. In terms of aircraft numbers, it was the Royal Navy's heaviest assault on the Japanese to date, with the three carriers embarking a total of 88 fighter planes.

Despite the lack of discipline from some of the fighter pilots, who abandoned their main mission of protecting the bombers to engage in dogfights with the enemy, the attack was pronounced a moderate success and gave way to follow-up attacks on Japanese oil production in Sumatra, under the codename Operation Meridian.
