= Philip Vian =

Royal Navy Admiral of the Fleet (1894–1968)

Admiral of the Fleet Sir Philip Vian GCB KBE DSO & Two Bars
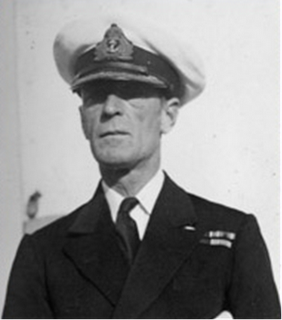
- Vian in 1940
- Born: 15 June 1894; London, England
- Died: 27 May 1968 (aged 73); Ashford Hill, Hampshire, England
- Military career
- Allegiance: United Kingdom
- Branch: Royal Navy
- Service years: 1907–1952
- Rank: Admiral of the Fleet
- Commands: Home Fleet; 1st Aircraft Carrier Squadron; 15th Cruiser Squadron; Force K HMS Cossack; HMS Ganges; HMS Arethusa; HMS Douglas; HMS Active
- Conflicts: First World War; Second World War; Volcano and Ryukyu Islands campaign
- Awards: Knight Grand Cross of the Order of the Bath; Knight Commander of the Order of the British Empire; Distinguished Service Order & Two Bars; Mentioned in despatches (5); Legion of Honour (France); Croix de guerre (France); Navy Distinguished Service Medal (United States); Commander of the Legion of Merit (United States); St. Olav's Medal With Oak Branch (Norway); Order of the Dannebrog (Denmark)
- Other work: Director, Midland Bank (1952); Director, North British and Mercantile Insurance Co. Published: Action this day (1960)

Admiral of the Fleet Sir Philip Louis Vian, GCB, KBE, DSO & Two Bars (15 June 1894 – 27 May 1968) was a Royal Navy officer who served in both World Wars.

Vian specialised in naval gunnery from the end of the First World War and received several appointments as gunnery officer. In the early 1930s, he was given command of a destroyer, HMS Active, and, later, various destroyer flotillas. During this phase of his career, in early 1940, he commanded a force that forcibly released captured British merchant sailors from the German supply ship Altmark in the Jøssingfjorden in then-neutral Norway and, later, his flotilla took an active role in the final action of the German battleship Bismarck.

Much of Vian's Second World War service was in the Mediterranean, where he commanded a cruiser squadron, defended several critical convoys and led naval support at the Allied invasions of Sicily and Italy. His wartime service was completed in command of the air component of the British Pacific Fleet, with successful actions against the Japanese in Sumatra and the western Pacific. Post-war, Vian served in the United Kingdom, as a Fifth Sea Lord and as Commander-in-Chief, Home Fleet. He retired in 1952 with the rank of Admiral of the Fleet, took up commercial directorships, and died at home in 1968.

== Early life ==
Born the son of Alsager Richard Vian and Ada Frances Vian (née Renault), Vian joined the Royal Navy as an officer cadet in May 1907 and was educated at the Royal Naval Colleges at Osborne and Dartmouth. On passing out from Dartmouth in 1911, Vian and his term sailed for the West Indies on the training cruiser HMS Cornwall but the cruise was ended by grounding on an uncharted reef off Nova Scotia. He became a midshipman on the pre-dreadnought battleship HMS Lord Nelson, which was serving with the Home Fleet, on 15 January 1912.

== First World War ==
At the start of the First World War, Vian remained on Lord Nelson which, as an obsolescent ship, was kept at Portland away from danger. This was disappointing for Vian, but when the ship was to be transferred to the Mediterranean he was posted to what he considered to be an even less desirable appointment. From October 1914 to September 1915, Vian served in HMS Argonaut, an old first-class protected cruiser patrolling in East African waters, on the lookout for the German cruiser Karlsruhe. He was confirmed as a sub-lieutenant in January 1915. Dissatisfied by the lack of action in Argonaut, Vian used a promise of help from Lord Fisher and subsequently received an appointment to HMS Morning Star, a modern Yarrow-built M-class destroyer, in October 1915. Whilst on this ship, he was a spectator at the Battle of Jutland, in which his ship played no active part. Promotion to lieutenant in 1917 (with seniority backdated to February 1916) resulted in two appointments as First Lieutenant in the destroyers HMS Ossory (September 1916) and HMS Sorceress (December 1917).

== Inter-war ==
Following gunnery courses in 1916, 1918 and 1919 at the gunnery school (HMS Excellent), Vian obtained a First Class certificate in Gunnery in October 1919. Despite being slated for service with the British Military Mission in Southern Russia, he was loaned to the Royal Australian Navy for two years from January 1920 and served as Gunnery Officer of HMAS Australia, then the Australian flagship. On his return to the Royal Navy, Vian was given a series of appointments as gunnery officer, first, in January 1923, to the battleship HMS Thunderer, then serving as a cadet training ship. During this appointment, he was promoted to lieutenant commander on 15 February 1924. This was followed in 1924 by two appointments to C-class cruisers (HMS Champion and HMS Castor). There was a short period at the Devonport gunnery school (HMS Vivid) and another sea posting, to the battleship HMS Emperor of India in the Mediterranean Fleet in May 1925.

There followed two foreign postings, still as a gunnery specialist. First in February 1927 to HMS Royal Sovereign, in the Mediterranean Fleet. This was followed, in November 1927, to HMS Kent, the then-flagship of the China Station, where he was promoted to commander on 30 June 1929. For the two years up to January 1933, Vian had a "shore" appointment at the Admiralty in London, with the Director of Training and Staff Duties (DTSD), analysing practice gunnery statistics. He then attended a short Tactical Course in Portsmouth and subsequently took command (his first), in March 1933, of the destroyer HMS Active and a Division within the 3rd Destroyer Flotilla (part of the Mediterranean Fleet).

A biography of the playwright Noël Coward refers to Coward meeting Vian at that time. Coward arrived at Bermuda on SS Roma on 28 May 1933 and boarded the light cruiser HMS Dragon on 30 May 1933. Vian's first words to Coward were "What the hell are you doing on board this ship?" However, after speaking to Coward and having gin with him in the captain's cabin, Vian permitted Coward to stay on the ship for a cruise on the ship ending on the Pacific side of the Panama Canal, Coward finally ending up in Trinidad some time later.

Two incidents occurred during this command for which Vian was held to be at fault: damage to Active while going astern alongside a depot ship in Malta and the loss of a torpedo from HMS Anthony. However, Vian's commander-in chief, William Fisher, had remained well-disposed towards him, and these incidents had no ill effect on his career: he was promoted to captain on 31 December 1934. On his return to the UK in early 1935, he was told to expect to spend time on half-pay, but the Abyssinian crisis intervened and he was given command of the 19th Destroyer Flotilla (on board HMS Douglas), which had been activated from the reserve to reinforce Malta.

Vian returned to the UK in July 1935 at the end of the crisis and attended a Senior Officers Technical Course before rejoining the 19th Destroyer Flotilla. In May 1936, he was transferred to command the 1st Destroyer Flotilla, flotilla leader HMS Keppel, also at Malta. In July, 1st Destroyer Flotilla returned to Portsmouth. En route home, however, Vian's ships responded to a call from the British Consul in Vigo for protection for British residents at the start of the Spanish Civil War. His ships acted in various roles, including, after discussion, the evacuation of British residents. When relieved by the 2nd Destroyer Flotilla, Vian's ships continued home. During a period at the Royal Naval College, Greenwich, Vian was unexpectedly offered an appointment as Flag-Captain to Rear-Admiral Lionel Wells in HMS Arethusa, flagship of the 3rd Cruiser Squadron, then part of the Mediterranean Fleet. He greatly preferred sea duties and gladly took up the new appointment in March 1937.

== Second World War ==
Vian returned to the UK shortly before the Second World War broke out. An appointment to command the boys' training establishment HMS Ganges was cancelled, and he was appointed to command of the 11th Destroyer Flotilla. This flotilla had been recently activated from reserve and consisting of seven old V and W-class destroyers plus his own ship, HMS Mackay, based first at Plymouth then at Liverpool, with the role of escorting Atlantic convoys. There was an ineffective brush with a U-boat. A change in policy required Vian, as a Captain (D), to operate from shore, the better to command his flotilla. Early in 1940 he moved, this time to command of the 4th Destroyer Flotilla, the famous Tribal-class destroyers. The leader's ship at the time was HMS Afridi but as she was due for a refit he swapped ships to take over HMS Cossack.

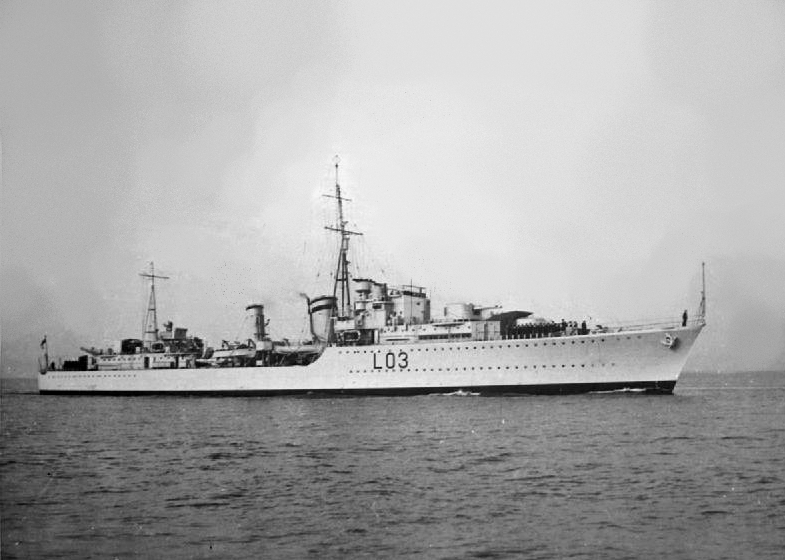
The destroyer, HMS Cossack, which Vian commanded

=== Altmark ===
In February 1940, Vian's flotilla was ordered to find and locate the German supply tanker, Altmark. This ship was believed to be holding around 300 British merchant seamen captured by Admiral Graf Spee. When found, Altmark was in neutral Norwegian waters, escorted by two Norwegian torpedo boats. After peacefully negating the Norwegian opposition, Vian pursued Altmark into Jøssingfjord, she was boarded and the captives were freed. The German and Norwegian governments protested that this was a violation of international law and of Norwegian neutrality. However, occurring during a quiet stage in the war, the incident was widely publicised in Britain. Vian was awarded the Distinguished Service Order (DSO) for this successful action; the citation was published in a supplement to the London Gazette of 9 April 1940 (dated 12 April 1940, and read:

Admiralty, Whitehall. 12th April, 1940.

The KING has been graciously pleased to give orders for the following Appointments to the Distinguished Service Order:—

To be a Companion of the Distinguished Service Order:

Captain Philip Louis Vian, Royal Navy, H.M.S. Cossack;

for outstanding ability, determination and resource in the preliminary dispositions which led to the rescue of 300 English prisoners from the German Armed Auxiliary Altmark, and for daring, leadership and masterly handling of his ship in narrow waters so as to bring her alongside and board the enemy, who tried to blind him with the glare of a searchlight, worked his engine full ahead and full astern, tried to ram him and drive him ashore and so threatened the grounding and loss of Cossack.

=== Naval actions ===
The Germans invaded Norway on 9 April 1940 and Vian, now in Afridi, was engaged in a number of operations against German shipping and warships and in support of Allied troops. On 9 April 1940, Vian's destroyers were escorting two cruisers (HMS Southampton and HMS Glasgow) off Bergen when they came under heavy German air attack. HMS Gurkha became isolated and was sunk. From 15 to 17 April, Afridi assisted and protected British troop landings at Namsos (Operation Maurice), which were a part of a planned pincer movement to seize Trondheim. Afridi later assisted the evacuation of Namsos and the rescue of the survivors of the Bison, during which, on 3 May, Afridi was bombed and sunk; the survivors were rescued by destroyers HMS Imperial and HMS Grenade. Vian was mentioned in despatches for his part in the action.

On the night of 13/14 October, Vian, now re-established in HMS Cossack and with HMS Ashanti, Maori and Sikh, attacked a small German convoy off Egerö light. Although the operation's success was over-stated (just one ship was sunk and later refloated), Vian was awarded a bar to his DSO.

On 22 May 1941, Vian, in HMS Cossack, with several destroyers, provided additional escort to troop convoy WS8B en route from Glasgow to the Indian Ocean. On 25 May, Vian's destroyers (HMS Cossack, Maori, Sikh, Zulu and ORP Piorun) were detached from the convoy to join the search for the German battleship Bismarck. Eventually, Vian's flotilla participated in the destruction of Bismarck. While the main battle fleet awaited daylight, they, in a series of night attacks, harried the German ship. They failed to score a hit in the darkness, but their activities fixed the German's position and denied the crew much-needed rest before the main battle on 27 May. Afterwards, they escorted HMS King George V back to Scotland. Vian received a second bar to his DSO for this action.

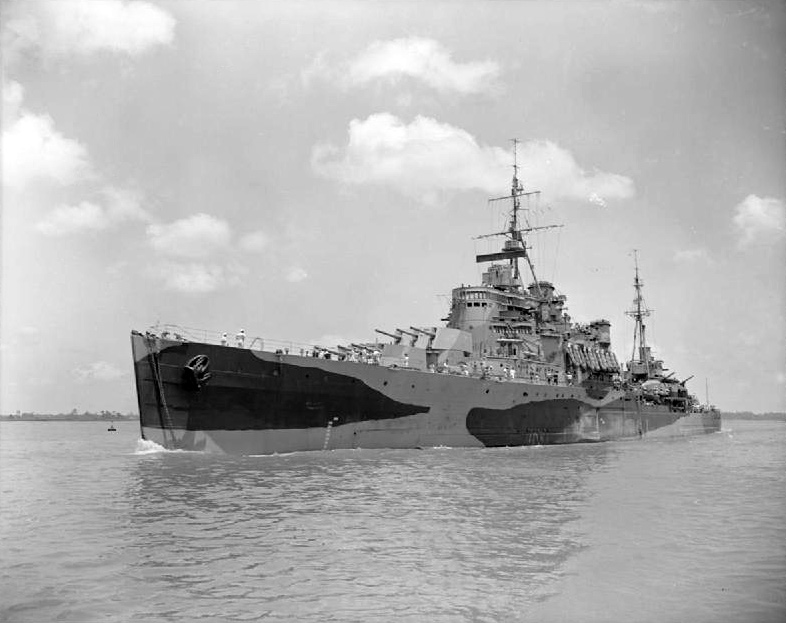
The light cruiser, HMS Nigeria, which formed part of Force K, under Vian's command

Vian was promoted to rear admiral on 8 July 1941, by special order of the First Sea Lord, Sir Dudley Pound. During July and August, 1941, Vian was involved in liaising with the Soviet Navy to assess their readiness and to investigate the practicalities of a British naval force being based at Murmansk or nearby. In the event, Vian advised against this, but in September, 1941, he commanded Force K, a naval force that supported an Anglo-Canadian raid and demolition on the Norwegian archipelago of Spitsbergen. The intention was to clear out any German garrison (there was none), destroy the coal mines and coal stocks and evacuate the Russian miners. The troops were aboard the liner RMS Empress of Canada, escorted by two Royal Navy cruisers, HMS Nigeria and HMS Aurora and three destroyers: HMS Icarus, HMS Anthony and HMS Antelope and several smaller ships. The operation was successful and during Force K's return, a German convoy was intercepted and the German training cruiser Bremse was sunk.

=== Mediterranean ===
In October 1941, Vian was given command of the 15th Cruiser Squadron (flag in HMS Naiad, stationed at Alexandria. The main naval tasks at this stage of the Mediterranean campaign were to ensure the survival of Malta as a British possession and military base by the protection of supply convoys while preventing Italian convoys supplying their forces in north Africa. Secondary tasks included the supply and artillery support of Allied military actions in north Africa and elsewhere, such as a successful bombardment of Derna in December. Vian's first convoy was in December 1941 and led to the First Battle of Sirte. This was, in effect, a series of skirmishes between British and Italian warships escorting desperately needed supply convoys. Overall, the fight was inconclusive, but both sides managed to deliver the supplies. There were several sorties to support the army and to intercept Italian convoys. On one such operation, in early March 1942, Vian's flagship, HMS Naiad, was torpedoed and sunk by U-565. Vian transferred his flag to HMS Dido and later to HMS Cleopatra.

Malta was still in a desperate state and another convoy (MG1) was run in March 1942. This time, the Italian Navy made a more determined attempt to intercept the convoy, leading to the Second Battle of Sirte. Vian's force of cruisers and destroyers, using threat and concealment by smoke, managed to hold off the Italians while the convoy escaped. The naval action was portrayed as a tactical success against a greatly superior enemy, although the convoy's progress was sufficiently delayed to leave it vulnerable to air attacks and all four transports were sunk and the bulk of the supplies were lost. Despite this, Vian received a personal letter of congratulation from Winston Churchill and he was appointed a Knight Commander of the Most Excellent Order of the British Empire (KBE).

In June 1942, Vian's force provided escort for the Operation Vigorous convoy from Haifa and Port Said. This was a part of a sequence of movements but it was rebuffed by strong surface and air forces and returned. After this failed operation, Vian's health deteriorated and he was sent back to Britain in September 1942. During a delay in the journey in west Africa, he caught malaria and was not passed fit for service until January, 1943. In January, he was mentioned in despatches for "outstanding zeal, patience and cheerfulness and for setting an example of wholehearted devotion to duty without which the high tradition of the Royal Navy could not have been upheld".

Vian's physical condition was now considered to debar him from further sea service and in April 1943 he was appointed to the planning staff for the invasion of Europe. Probably much to his relief, however, this shore job was pre-empted by his return to the Mediterranean to command (from HMS Glengyle) an amphibious force for the Allied invasion of Sicily in July 1943.

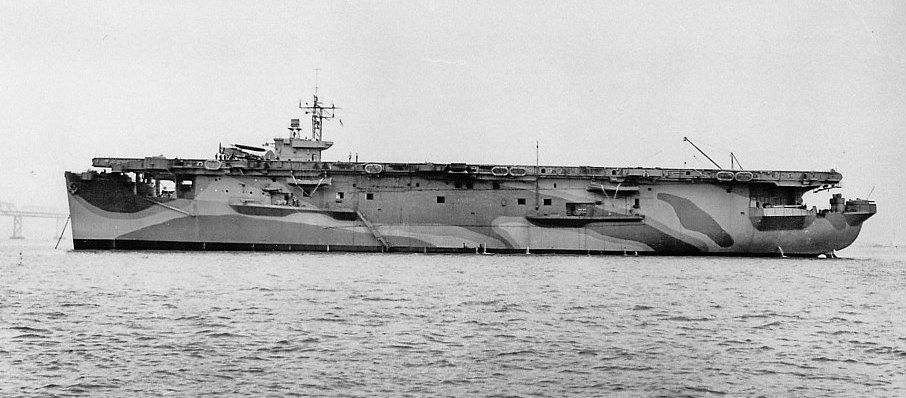
HMS Attacker at anchor in San Francisco Bay on 13 November 1942

In September 1943, he commanded Force V, a flotilla of escort aircraft carriers providing air support for the Allied landings at Salerno, Italy. Force V comprised the escort aircraft carriers HMS Attacker, HMS Battler, HMS Hunter and HMS Stalker, and the maintenance carrier HMS Unicorn, acting temporarily as a light fleet carrier. The planned period had to be increased and, when Lieutenant General Mark Clark, commanding the American Fifth Army, requested Force V to stay longer despite fuel shortages, Vian replied: "My carriers will stay here if we have to row back." Vian was twice mentioned in despatches; once for each of the Italian operations.

=== Normandy landings ===
In November 1943, Vian returned to the UK as commander of Force J in preparation for D-Day and in January 1944, he was appointed commander of the Eastern Task Force (in HMS Scylla), supporting the D-Day landings in Normandy. He was appointed Companion of the Order of the Bath (CB) in the King's Birthday Honours, which coincided with the early stages of the invasion. After the success of the landings, he was appointed Knight Commander of the Order of the Bath (KCB) "for distinguished services in the planning and execution of the successful landings".

=== British Pacific Fleet ===
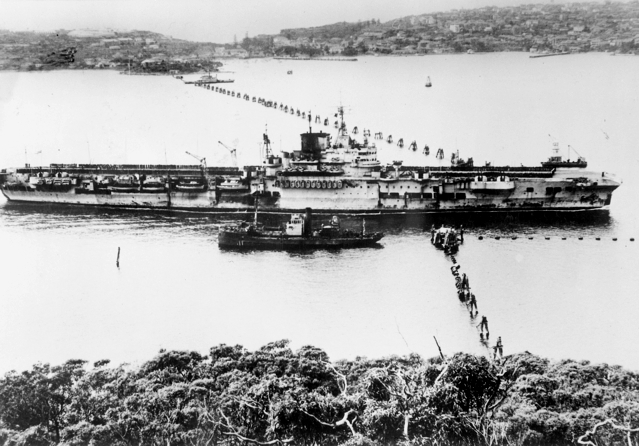
HMS Formidable passing through the Sydney Harbour anti-submarine boom net in 1945. The blackened funnel is due to damage from a kamikaze attack.

In November 1944, Vian became the commander in charge of air operations of the British Pacific Fleet (Flag Officer Commanding, 1st Aircraft Carrier Squadron, British Pacific Fleet and Second in Command, British Pacific Fleet, in HMS Formidable). The first operations of Vian's new command were against Japanese oil and port installations in Sumatra (Operations Cockpit, Transom, Lentil and Meridian). These served to damage the enemy's capabilities, distract his attention from events elsewhere and provide experience for the British and Commonwealth crews in the procedures that they would use while working with the Americans in the western Pacific. The U.S. aircraft carrier, USS Saratoga, participated in the training exercises and the first two operations. Vian was mentioned in despatches once again for "bravery, skill and devotion to duty". Once in the Pacific, the BPF operated as Task Force 57 from March 1945, providing air support for the American invasion of Okinawa (Operation Iceberg). Their role was to interdict the Sakishima Islands, suppressing Japanese air operations. Vian's carriers were externally resistant to the determined suicide attacks, returning to active service within hours. He was promoted to vice admiral on 8 May 1945.

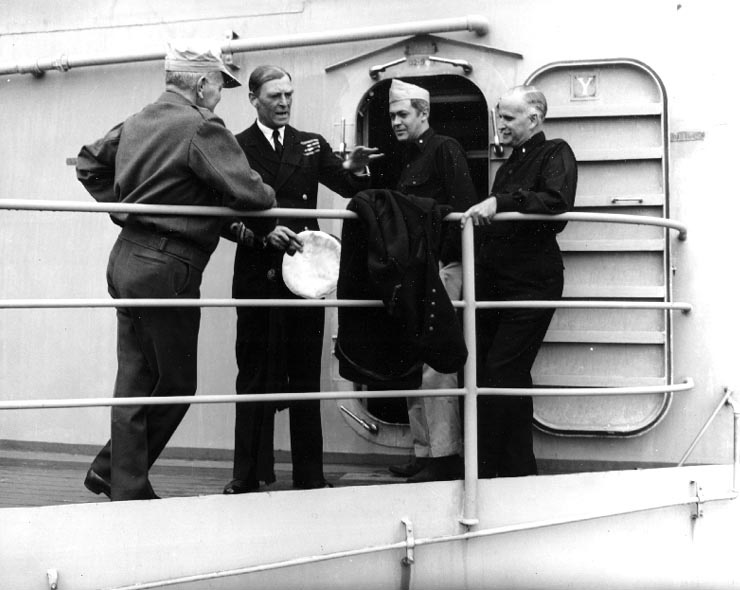
Philip Vian (2nd from left) with Admiral Halsey aboard USS Missouri, c. mid-1945

== Post war ==
After the Japanese surrender, Vian returned finally to the UK and became Fifth Sea Lord in charge of naval aviation from 1946 until 1948, when he was promoted to admiral. His final appointment was commander in chief, Home Fleet (in HMS Vanguard) until his retirement in 1952. He was promoted to Knight Grand Cross of the Order of the Bath (GCB) in the 1952 New Year Honours. On 1 June 1952 he was promoted to the rank of Admiral of the Fleet.

Vian was mentioned in despatches five times, and received several foreign awards.

In retirement, Vian became a director of the Midland Bank and the North British and Mercantile Insurance Company. He also published his memoirs, Action This Day, in 1960. He died on 27 May 1968 at his home at Ashford Hill, Hampshire near Newbury, Berkshire.

== Family ==
Vian married, on 2 December 1929, Marjorie, daughter of Colonel David Price Haig, OBE of Withyham in Sussex; they had two daughters.

== Honours ==
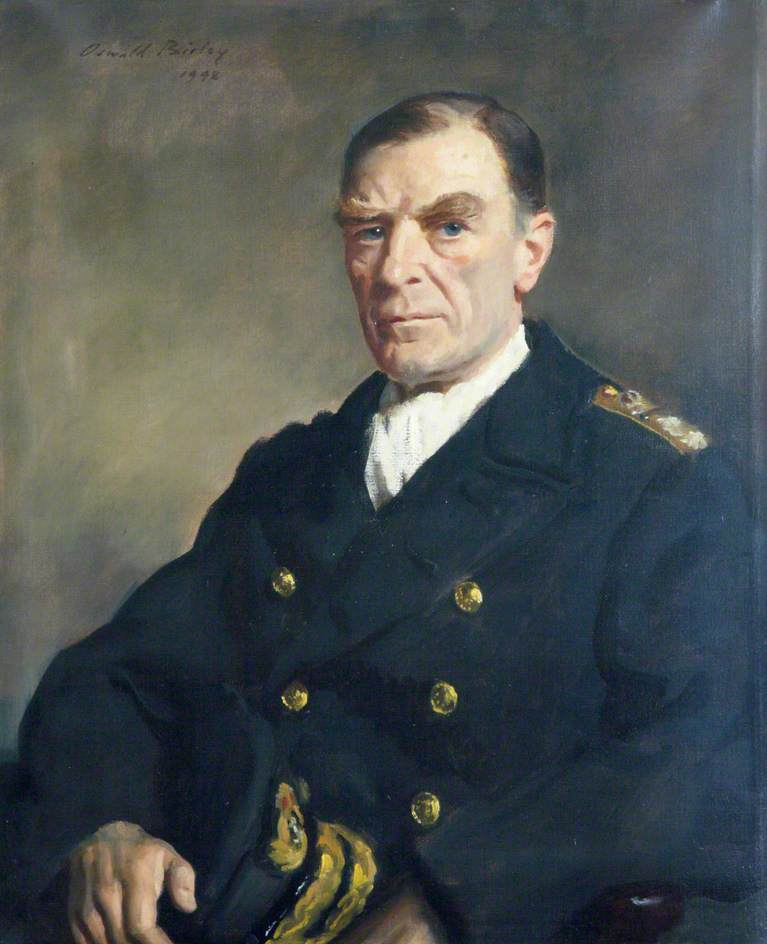
Philip Louis Vian by Oswald Birley, 1948

Vian's honours were as follows:

Knight Grand Cross of the Order of the Bath	1952
Knight Commander of the Order of the Bath	1944
Companion of the Order of the Bath	1944
Knight Commander of the Order of the British Empire	1942
Distinguished Service Order and two bars	1940, 1940, 1941
1914-15 Star	
British War Medal	
Victory Medal (United Kingdom) with MiD	
1939-1945 Star	
Atlantic Star and Rosette (France & Germany)	
Africa Star	
Pacific Star	
Italy Star	
Defence Medal (United Kingdom)	
War Medal 1939-45 with MiD	
King George VI Coronation Medal	
Queen Elizabeth II Coronation Medal	
Légion d'honneur (France)	
Croix de Guerre 1939–1945 with Bronze Palm (France)	
Legion of Merit, Degree of Commander (United States)	1945
Navy Distinguished Service Medal (United States)	1946
St. Olav's Medal With Oak Branch (Norway)	1948
Order of the Dannebrog (Denmark)	

== See also ==
- List of Legion of Honour recipients by name (V)

== Sources ==
- Haarr, Geirr (2013). The Gathering Storm: The Naval War in Northern Europe, September 1939 – April 1940. Naval Institute Press. ISBN 978-1591143314.
- Heathcote, Tony (2002). The British Admirals of the Fleet: 1734–1995. Pen & Sword Ltd. ISBN 0-85052-835-6.
- Vian, Sir Philip (1960). Action This Day. Frederick Muller. ASIN B0000CKIR4.

Military offices
Preceded by Sir Thomas Troubridge	Fifth Sea Lord; 1946–1948	Succeeded by Sir George Creasy
Preceded by Sir Rhoderick McGrigor	Commander-in-Chief, Home Fleet; 1950–1952	Succeeded by Sir George Creasy
