= HMS Kempenfelt (R03) =

Destroyer of the Royal Navy

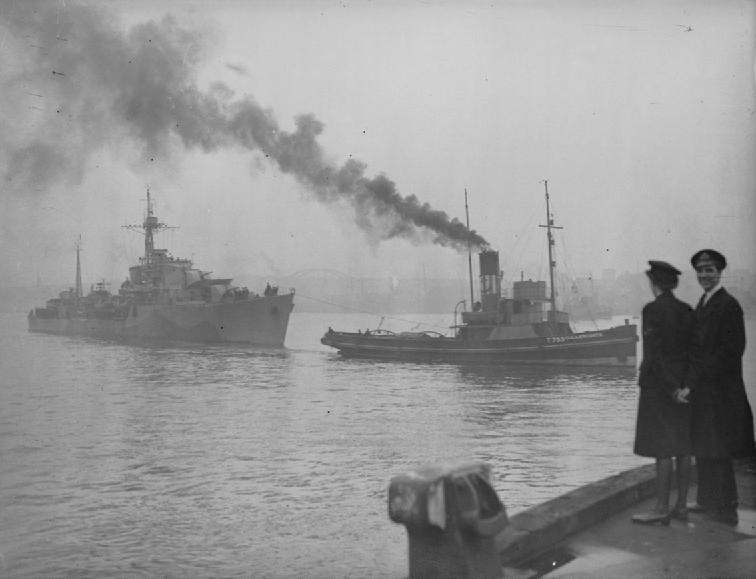
- HMS Kempenfelt being towed into Newcastle after serving off the Normandy coast

History

United Kingdom
- Name: HMS Kempenfelt
- Namesake: Richard Kempenfelt
- Ordered: December 1941
- Builder: John Brown & Company, Clydebank
- Laid down: 24 June 1942
- Launched: 8 May 1943
- Commissioned: 25 October 1943
- Out of service: Sold to Yugoslavia in October 1956
- Motto: Fideliter: Faithfully
- Honours and awards: Atlantic 1939; Anzio 1944; Normandy 1944; Okinawa 1945
- Notes: Pennant number: R03 later changed to D103
- Badge: On a field Black a Swan proper between two wings Green over wavelets Silver and Blue.

Yugoslavia
- Name: Kotor
- Namesake: City of Kotor
- Acquired: October 1956
- Identification: R-21
- Fate: Decommissioned in 1971 and sold for scrapping

General characteristics
- Class & type: W-class destroyer
- Displacement: 1,710 tons (1,730 tonnes); 2,530 tons full (2,570 tonnes)
- Length: 362.75 ft (110.57 m) o/a
- Beam: 35.75 ft (10.90 m)
- Draught: 10 ft (3.0 m)
- Propulsion: 2 Admiralty 3-drum boilers, Parsons single-reduction geared steam turbines, 40,000 shp (30 MW), 2 shafts
- Speed: 36 knots (67 km/h; 41 mph) / 32 knots (59 km/h; 37 mph) full
- Range: 4,675 nmi (8,658 km) at 20 knots (37 km/h)
- Complement: 225
- Sensors & processing systems: Radar Type 272 target indication; Radar Type 291 air warning; Radar Type 285 fire control on director Mk.III(W); Radar Type 282 fire control on 40 mm mount Mk.IV
- Armament: 4 × QF4.7-inch (120 mm) Mk.IX guns on single mounts CP Mk.XXII; 4 × QF 2-pounder (40 mm) Mk VIII guns, quad mount Mk.VII; 4 × A/A mountings; twin 20 mm Oerlikon Mk.V; single Bofors 40 mm Mk.III guns; single QF 2 pdr Mk.XVI; 8 (4x2) tubes for 21-inch (533 mm) torpedo Mk.IX; 2 racks & 4 throwers for 70 depth charges
- Aircraft carried: None

HMS Kempenfelt was a W-class destroyer flotilla leader of the Royal Navy that served in the Second World War. She was the second destroyer of her name to have served in the war; the first Kempenfelt was transferred to the Royal Canadian Navy in October 1939 and renamed HMCS Assiniboine.

== Construction and commissioning ==
Kempenfelt was ordered in December 1941 and was laid down at the Clydebank yards of John Brown and Company. She was built as HMS Valentine, but this was changed to Kempenfelt as part of a rationalisation of the names used for the later wartime classes of destroyers. She was launched on 8 May 1943 and commissioned into service on 25 October 1943. During her time under construction she had been adopted by the civil community of Hammersmith after a successful Warship Week national savings campaign.

== Wartime career ==
=== Mediterranean ===
Kempenfelt joined the 24th Destroyer Flotilla in the Mediterranean in December 1943, and in January was assigned to support the Allied landings at Anzio (Operation Shingle). On 21 January she and the destroyers Inglefield and the Free French Le Malin bombarded Gaeta, before deploying the next day with a number of destroyers as a screen for the cruisers Orion and Spartan. On 27 January Kempenfelt shelled a train near Formia. After the completion of Operation Shingle she was released, and spent between February and April escorting convoys and patrolling in the central Mediterranean.

=== Normandy ===
In May Kempenfelt returned to the UK, joining the 26th Destroyer Flotilla in preparation for the invasion of Normandy. The flotilla were assigned to Force J, with orders to bombard the beach defences at Lagrune sur Mer. On 5 June she sailed as part of an escort for one of the invasion convoys, and on 6 June stood off the beach with Force J and provided fire support for the landings. Later in the day she moved to join the cruiser Diadem in supporting the landings at Beny sur Mer. Kempenfelt returned to Britain in July, and was assigned to the Home Fleet at Scapa Flow. She was then nominated to undergo a refit at Cardiff to prepare her to join the British Eastern Fleet as the leader of the 27th Destroyer Flotilla. On 22 August she deployed with the flotilla as a screen for the aircraft carriers Indefatigable, Furious and Formidable, the battleship Duke of York and the cruisers Berwick and Devonshire for the air attacks on the Tirpitz (Operation Goodwood). After being released from this service on 24 August, Kempenfelt sailed to Cardiff.

=== Far East ===
She spent September under refit, and after working up, sailed in October to join the Eastern Fleet at Ceylon. She joined the fleet at Trincomalee on 22 November, and in December was nominated to screen the major fleet units as they carried out air attacks on oilfields on Sumatra (Operation Outflank). She sailed on 17 December with the destroyers Wessex, Wrangler, Whirlwind and Wakeful, escorting the carriers Illustrious and Indomitable, and the cruisers Black Prince, Argonaut and Newcastle, and arrived in position on 20 December. The attacks were carried out and the fleet returned to Trincomalee.

Kempenfelt took part in further screening operations in January, covering fleet units for Operation Meridian, before sailing for Fremantle at the end of the month with the ships of Force 63. They arrived on 4 February, before transferring to Sydney, where they carried out exercises with elements of the US Navy. They sailed on 28 February to join the British Pacific Fleet at its forward base at Manus, in the Admiralty Islands. The force, designated Task Force 113 carried out screening duties throughout March, before being assigned to the United States Fifth Fleet on 22 March. The force then supported the US Fleet in its preparation for the Battle of Okinawa (Operation Iceberg). Kempenfelt remained on station throughout April, before sailing for the US Forward-base at Leyte, arriving there on 24 April.

On 1 May Kempenfelt and a number of British destroyers screened operations off Okinawa, before Kempenfelt was deployed on 11 May as a screen for the cruiser Swiftsure, to provide advance warning of incoming kamikaze attacks. She was detached on 22 May to escort the carrier Formidable to Manus, after Formidable had been damaged by a kamikaze. She escorted Formidable to Sydney in June, after which Kempenfelt underwent a refit. On its completion, she returned to Manus in August, and on 15 August she sailed to Subic Bay to join the taskforce assembling to reoccupy Hong Kong. She sailed on 27 August with the destroyers Whirlwind, Quadrant and Ursa screening the carriers Indomitable and Venerable, and the cruisers Swiftsure, Euryalus and Black Prince to oversee the surrender.

== Post war ==
Kempenfelt remained with the British Pacific Fleet until December 1945. She returned to Chatham in January 1946 where she was reduced to the reserve. She spent two years in the reserve, before transferring to Simonstown, South Africa. She returned to Britain in 1953 and was laid up at Portsmouth, before being placed on the disposal list.

== Transfer to Yugoslav Navy ==
Kempenfelt and her sister, Wager, were sold to Yugoslavia in 1956, being towed to Yugoslavia for a refit in October. Kempenfelt was renamed R-21 Kotor and was re-commissioned on 10 September 1959. She served until being decommissioned and scrapped in 1971.
