= Operation Outflank =

Operation Outflank was the first combat operation of the British Pacific Fleet (BPF). It was a series of raids by the Fleet Air Arm on the oil refineries and storage facilities of the Empire of Japan on the island of Sumatra:

- Operation Robson (20 December 1944)
- Operation Lentil (4 January 1945)
- Operation Meridian I (24 January 1945), II (29 January 1945)

Units participating in Outflank received the "Palembang 1945" battle honour, after the main target of the attacks: the refineries at Palembang.
