= HMS Whirlwind (R87) =

W-class destroyer converted to Type 15 frigate of the Royal Navy

Coordinates: 52°16′47″N 04°40′41″W

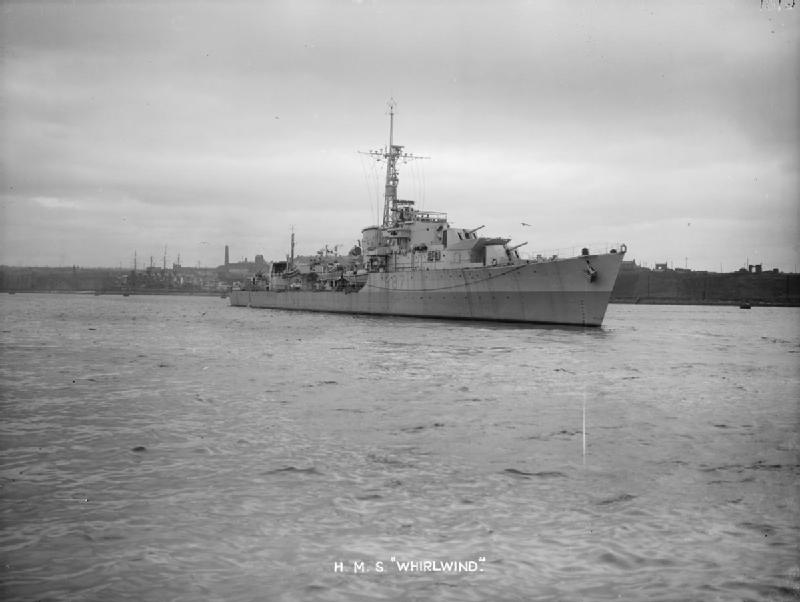
- Whirlwind in 1944

History

United Kingdom
- Name: HMS Whirlwind
- Builder: Hawthorn Leslie
- Launched: 30 August 1943
- Reclassified: Antisubmarine frigate (F187) 1953
- Fate: Foundered while in use as target 29 October 1974

General characteristics as W class
- Class & type: W-class destroyer
- Displacement: 1,710 tons (1,730 tonnes); 2,530 tons full (2,570 tonnes)
- Length: 362.75 ft (110.57 m) o/a
- Beam: 35.75 ft (10.90 m)
- Draught: 10 ft (3.0 m)
- Propulsion: 2 Admiralty 3-drum boilers, Parsons single-reduction geared steam turbines, 40,000 shp (30 MW), 2 shafts
- Speed: 36 knots (67 km/h; 41 mph) / 32 knots (59 km/h; 37 mph) full
- Range: 4,675 nautical miles (8,658 km; 5,380 mi) at 20 knots (37 km/h; 23 mph)
- Complement: 179 (225 as leader)
- Sensors & processing systems: Radar Type 272 target indication; Radar Type 291 air warning; Radar Type 285 fire control on director Mk.III(W); Radar Type 282 fire control on 40 mm mount Mk.IV
- Armament: 4 × QF 4.7-inch (120-mm) L/45 Mk.IX, single mounts CP Mk.XXII; 2 × QF 40 mm Bofors, twin mount "Hazemeyer" Mk.IV; 4 ×** twin 20 mm Oerlikon Mk.V; 8 (4x2) tubes for 21 inch (533 mm) torpedoes Mk.IX; 2 racks & 4 throwers for 70 depth charges

General characteristics Type 15 frigate
- Class & type: Type 15 frigate
- Displacement: 2,300 tons (standard)
- Length: 358 ft (109 m) o/a
- Beam: 37.75 ft (11.51 m)
- Draught: 14.5 ft (4.4 m)
- Propulsion: 2 × Admiralty 3-drum boilers, steam turbines on 2 shafts, 40,000 shp (30 MW)
- Speed: 31 knots (57 km/h; 36 mph) (full load)
- Complement: 174
- Sensors & processing systems: Radar; Type 293Q target indication.; Type 277Q surface search; Type 974 navigation; Type 262 fire control on director CRBF; Type 1010 Cossor Mark 10 IFF; Sonar: Type 174 search; Type 162 target classification; Type 170 attack
- Armament: 1 × twin 4 in gun Mark 19; 1 × twin 40mm Bofors Mk.5; 2 × Squid A/S mortar or; 2 × Limbo Mark 10 A/S mortar

The second HMS Whirlwind was a W-class destroyer of the British Royal Navy and was built by Hawthorn Leslie and launched on 30 August 1943. She saw service during World War II and the Cold War.

== Design and construction ==
Whirlwind was one of eight W-class destroyers ordered as the 9th Emergency Flotilla on 3 December 1941. The W-class were War Emergency Programme destroyers, intended for general duties, including use as anti-submarine escort, and were to be suitable for mass-production. They were based on the hull and machinery of the pre-war J-class destroyers, but with a lighter armament (effectively whatever armament was available) in order to speed production. The W-class were almost identical to the U-class ordered as the 7th Emergency Flotilla and the V-class ordered as the 8th Emergency Flotilla earlier in the year, with the major difference the fitting of a new dual-purpose fire control director, capable of directing both anti-aircraft and anti-aircraft fire.

Whirlwind was laid down at Hawthorn Leslie's Hebburn, Tyneside shipyard on 31 July 1942, was launched on 30 August 1943 and was completed on 20 July 1944.

The W-class were 362 feet 9 inches (110.57 m) long overall, 348 feet 0 inches (106.07 m) at the waterline and 339 feet 6 inches (103.48 m) between perpendiculars, with a beam of 35 feet 8 inches (10.87 m) and a draught of 10 feet 3 inches (3.12 m) mean and 14 feet 3 inches (4.34 m) full load. Displacement was 1,710 long tons (1,740 t) standard and 2,530 long tons (2,570 t) full load. Two Admiralty 3-drum water-tube boilers supplied steam at 300 pounds per square inch (2,100 kPa) and 630 °F (332 °C) to two sets of Parsons single-reduction geared steam turbines, which drove two propeller shafts. The machinery was rated at 40,000 shaft horsepower (30,000 kW) giving a maximum speed of 36 knots (41 mph; 67 km/h) (32 knots (37 mph; 59 km/h) at full load). 615 tons of oil were carried, giving a range of 4,675 nautical miles (5,380 mi; 8,658 km) at 20 knots (23 mph; 37 km/h).

The ship had a main gun armament of four 4.7 inch (120 mm) QF Mk. IX guns, capable of elevating to an angle of 55 degrees, giving a degree of anti-aircraft capability. The close-in anti-aircraft armament for the class was one Hazemayer stabilised twin mount for the Bofors 40 mm gun and four twin Oerlikon 20 mm cannons. Two quadruple mounts for 21 inch (533 mm) torpedoes were fitted, while the ship had a depth charge outfit of four depth charge mortars and two racks, with a total of 70 charges carried.

Whirlwind was fitted with a Type 276 surface warning radar on the ship's lattice foremast, together with a high-frequency direction finding (HF/DF) aerial, with a Type 291 air warning radar on a pole mast aft. A Type 285 fire control radar integrated with the ship's high-angle gun director, while the Hazemayer mount had an integrated Type 282 radar. Whirlwind had a crew of 179 officers and other ranks.

== Royal Navy service ==
On commissioning, when the ship was assigned the pennant number R87, Whirlwind was allocated to serve with the Eastern Fleet, and left Britain in October 1944. While on passage, she was briefly diverted to operations in the Mediterranean, escorting the battleship King George V during a bombardment of the island of Milos in the Aegean on 13 November 1944, before continuing to the Eastern Fleet's base at Trincomalee in Ceylon (now Sri Lanka). Whirlwind joined the British Pacific Fleet when it formed on 22 November 1944, and took part in the fleet's first operation, Operation Robson, a strike by carrier-borne aircraft from Indomitable and Illustrious against targets in Sumatra on 17–23 December 1944. On 16 January 1945, the British Pacific Fleet, including Whirlwind, left Trincomalee for the Pacific. The task force's carriers launched two raids against oil refineries in Sumatra, Operation Meridian on 24 January and 29 January before completing passage to the Pacific when the Fleet reached Fremantle in Australia on 4 February 1945.

Following service in the Second World War, Whirlwind was based at Rosyth in 1947 and 1948 as a boys training ship. Between 1952 and 1953 she was converted into a Type 15 fast anti-submarine frigate by Palmers, with the new pennant number F187.

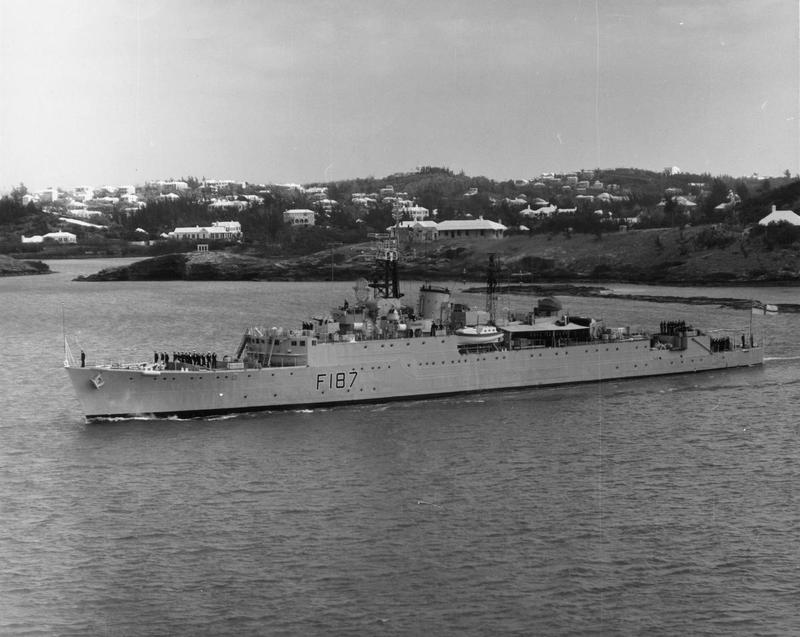
Whirlwind after conversion to Type 15 Frigate, c1965 (IWM)

She recommissioned on 28 July 1953 and was allocated to the 5th Frigate Squadron for service in the Mediterranean. In 1954 she participated in the recovery of the wreckage of the crashed de Havilland Comet off the island of Elba. In 1956 she was part of the Royal Navy force deployed to the Eastern Mediterranean as part of the Suez Crisis. At this time she was part of the 5th Frigate Squadron. She also undertook patrols off the Cyprus coast. Between June 1959 and May 1961 she underwent a refit at Rosyth.

In 1961 Whirlwind recommissioned to the 8th Frigate Squadron for service at Home and in the West Indies. In December 1962 Whirlwind was at Bermuda during the talks between British Prime Minister Harold Macmillan and American President John F. Kennedy that resulted in the Nassau Agreement which allowed Britain to purchase Polaris nuclear-armed missiles. Whirlwind's crew provided security for the meeting while the ship formed a communications link for the Ministry of Defence. In 1964, along with HMS Rothesay, Whirlwind deployed for patrol off Bahamas to intercept illegal traffic from Cuba.

== Decommissioning and disposal ==
In 1966 Whirlwind was placed on the disposal list. On 12 August 1969 she was towed from Portsmouth to Pembroke Dock for use as a target. She foundered at her moorings in Cardigan Bay on 29 October 1974 while in use as a target.

== Bibliography ==
- Colledge, J. J.; Warlow, Ben (2006) [1969]. Ships of the Royal Navy: The Complete Record of All Fighting Ships of the Royal Navy from the 15th Century to the Present (3rd Rev ed.). London: Chatham Publishing. ISBN 978-1-86176-281-8. OCLC 67375475.
- Critchley, Mike (1982). British Warships Since 1945: Part 3: Destroyers. Liskeard, UK: Maritime Books. ISBN 0-9506323-9-2.
- Friedman, Norman (2008). British Destroyers & Frigates: The Second World War and After. Barnsley, UK: Seaforth Publishing. ISBN 978-1-84832-015-4.
- Gardiner, Robert; Chesneau, Roger, eds. (1980). Conway's All The World's Fighting Ships 1922–1946. London: Conway Maritime Press. ISBN 0-85177-146-7.
- Hobbs, David (2017). The British Pacific Fleet: The Royal Navy's Most Powerful Strike Force. Barnsley, UK: Seaforth Publishing. ISBN 978-1-5267-0283-8.
- Lenton, H.T. (1970). Navies of the Second World War: British Fleet & Escort Destroyers Volume Two. London: Macdonald & Co. ISBN 0-356-03122-5.
- Marriott, Leo (1989). Royal Navy Destroyers Since 1945. Shepperton, UK: Ian Allan. ISBN 0-7110-1817-0.
- Marriott, Leo (1983). Royal Navy Frigates 1945–1983. Shepperton, UK: Ian Allan. ISBN 0-7110-1322-5.
- Raven, Alan; Roberts, John (1978). War Built Destroyers O to Z Classes. London: Bivouac Books. ISBN 0-85680-010-4.
- Rohwer, Jürgen; Hümmelchen, Gerhard (1992). Chronology of the War at Sea 1939–1945. London: Greenhill Books. ISBN 1-85367-117-7.
- Whitley, M. J. (2000). Destroyers of World War 2: An International Encyclopedia. London: Cassell & Co. ISBN 1-85409-521-8.
