= Kualasimpang =

Kota Kualasimpang
- Town and District
- Interactive map of Kota Kualasimpang
- Coordinates: 4°17′3.35″N 98°3′37.16″E
- Country: Indonesia
- Province: Aceh
- Regency: Aceh Tamiang Regency

Population (2020)
  - Total: 18.858
- Time zone: UTC+7 (WIB)
- Postal code: 24475

Kualasimpang or Kota Kuala Simpang is an administrative district (kecamatan) in Aceh Tamiang Regency, Aceh, Indonesia.
