= Operation Meridian =

1945 British attack on Japanese oil refineries

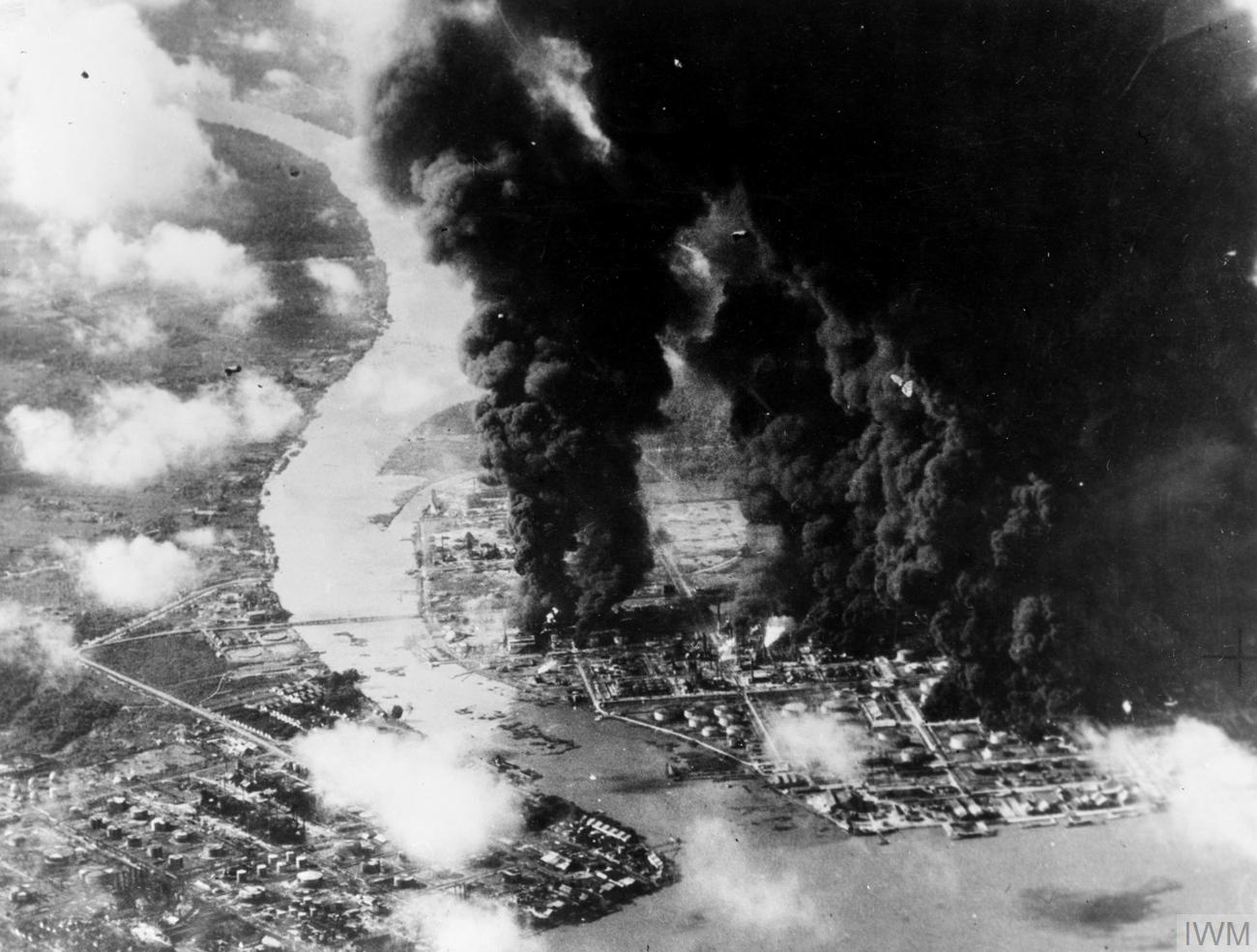
An oil refinery at Palembang on fire after being attacked by the Royal Navy in January 1945

Operation Meridian, also known as the "Palembang Raids" was part of a series of British air attacks directed at Japanese-held oil refineries near Palembang on Sumatra during the Second World War, Meridian had two phases: Meridian I on 24 January 1945 and Meridian II on 29 January. As a result, the critical aviation fuel output of the plants at Palembang was reduced by seventy-five percent.

== Background ==
In August 1944, Operation Boomerang the USAF had used Boeing B-29 Superfortress heavy bombers against the refineries to cut the supply of fuel to the Japanese. The attack had been largely unsuccessful but had shown B-29s could lay naval mines.

At the end of 1944, Rear Admiral Sir Philip Vian had deployed the aircraft carriers Indomitable, Indefatigable and Victorious for an air attack (operation Robson) against a refinery at Belawan Deli, in North Sumatra The carrier squadrons had exchanged their Fairey Barracuda aircraft for US-supplied Grumman Avengers which, due to their radial engines, had better performance in the hot climate.

The two refineries at Palembang were the largest in South East Asia and could supply Japan with three-quarters of its aviation fuel needs.

The attacks would be made by aircraft from the British Task Force 63 of the British Pacific Fleet, en route to Sydney, Australia, where it would then be deployed in the Pacific (Note: And subsequently participated in the support of the Allied invasion of Okinawa (Operation Iceberg)) . Refuelling at sea was needed and this was supplied by Task Force 69 of the British Eastern Fleet - three tankers and their escort.

Task Force 63 left Trincomalee in Ceylon on 13 January 1945, for Sumatra. On 20 January, Task Force 63 rendezvoused with Task Force 69 and refuelled with great difficulty because of gusting winds and a troublesome swell. The oilers complained of much pumping gear being damaged.

== Meridian I ==
The first attack - against the oil refinery at Pladjoe, north of Palembang, Sumatra - was delayed by poor weather from 21 January and the fleet waited off Enggano Island. The attack was finally launched at 6 am on 24 January with a lack of wind making take-off more risky.

Forty-three Grumman Avenger torpedo bombers, twelve Fairey Firefly fighter-bombers with rockets and fifty Grumman Hellcat, Vought Corsair and Supermarine Seafire fighters were launched. Japanese aircraft intercepted the force but the bombers approached with the sun behind them and dived from 9,000 feet to 3,000 feet to release their bombs. Despite the presence of barrage balloons the refinery was successfully attacked. Losses were heavier than on previous raids; 7 aircraft were lost due to enemy action and 25 to crash landings. The Avenger squadrons that participated included 820, 849, 854 and 857 Naval Air Squadrons.

== Meridian II ==
The fleet refuelled and replenished on 26–27 January. In practice, this was unsatisfactory as, with a mixture of poor weather and inexperience, the tankers suffered damage as ships failed to keep station and hoses parted.

On 29 January, the second raid, this time against the oil refinery at Soengei Gerong, Sumatra, was undertaken. Despite poor visibility, the flying-off was delayed by less than half an hour and the air strike was made against the oil refinery. Forty-six Avengers bombed the refinery. At least 11 Japanese planes shot down in dogfights and another 30 destroyed on the ground at nearby airfields, for the loss of 16 British aircraft to the enemy and 25 to "other causes". A small Japanese counterattack was attempted, but was defeated by the fighter cover and anti-aircraft fire. Refinery output was stopped for two months and by the end of March the total output from the attacked refineries was only one third of capacity.

Task Force 63 refuelled from Task Force 69 for the final time on 30 January and sailed for Fremantle, Western Australia arriving on 4 February, while Task Force 69 returned to Trincomalee.

== Allied order of battle ==
The ships involved in Operation Meridian were:

Force 63: (Rear Admiral Philip Vian):

- Aircraft carriers: HMS Indomitable, Illustrious, Indefatigable and Victorious
- Battleship: HMS King George V
- Anti-aircraft cruisers: HMS Argonaut, Black Prince and Euryalus,
- Destroyer Flotilla 25: HMS Grenville, Undine, Ursa and Undaunted
- Destroyer Flotilla 27: HMS Kempenfelt, Wakeful, Whirlwind, Wager, Whelp and Wessex (from 19 January 1945)

Force 69

- HMS Ceylon (light cruiser)
- HMS Urchin (destroyer)
- Oilers: RFA Wave King, RFA Echodale, Empire Salvage

== See also ==
- Operation Boomerang
