= Sungai Gerong =

Coordinates: 2.9510°S 104.8690°E

Sungai Gerong is an industrial area in South Sumatra, laying just east of the Palembang city, Indonesia. Built by SVPM, in 1912 where the operation started in 1926, starting the discovery of Petak field, in 1914, Trembule field, then Talang Akar found in 1921 as the company large investment, completion the crudes pipeline operations in 1952 from the South Sumatra oil-field.

In 1970, The Republic of Indonesia bought this refinery from PT Stanvac Indonesia to become part of its Government Oil Company, PERTAMINA.
