= RFA Wave King =

1944 Wave-class oiler of the Royal Fleet Auxiliary

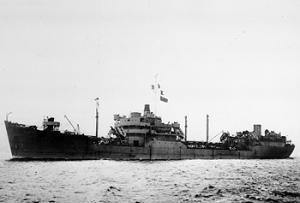

History

United Kingdom
- Name: RFA Wave King
- Builder: Harland & Wolff, Govan
- Yard number: 1222
- Laid down: 23 March 1943
- Launched: 6 April 1944
- Completed: 22 July 1944
- Commissioned: 22 July 1944
- Decommissioned: 1956
- Fate: Scrapped in April 1960

General characteristics
- Tonnage: 8,159 gross register tons (GRT)
- Displacement: 16,483 long tons full load
- Length: 473 ft 8 in (144.37 m)
- Beam: 64 ft 3 in (19.58 m)
- Draught: 35 ft 4 in (10.77 m)
- Propulsion: Parsons double reduction geared turbines,3 drum type boilers, 6,800 hp (5,100 kW).
- Speed: 14.5 knots (26.9 km/h)

RFA Wave King (A182) was a Wave-class fleet support tanker of the Royal Fleet Auxiliary built at Govan by Harland & Wolff Ltd. In 1945, she served in the Far East with the British Pacific Fleet, designated Task Force 57 upon joining the United States fleet. On 6 May 1945 Wave King and Wave Monarch were with the Logistic Support Group 300 miles south-east of Miyako to refuel Task Force 57 which was launching air strikes against island targets in the Okinawa campaign.

Wave King struck a rock north of São Luís de Maranhão, Brazil, on 9 August 1956 and suffered severe damage. She arrived at Barrow-in-Furness on 16 April 1960 for scrapping.
