= HMS Wager (R98) =

Destroyer of the Royal Navy

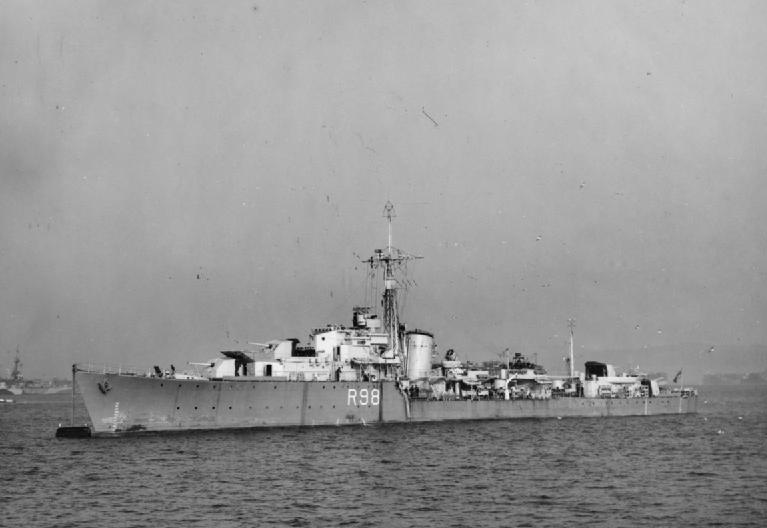
- HMS Wager on completion, 1944 (IWM)

History

United Kingdom
- Name: HMS Wager
- Namesake: HMS Wager(1739)
- Ordered: December 1941
- Builder: John Brown & Company, Clydebank
- Laid down: 20 November 1942
- Launched: 1 November 1943
- Commissioned: 14 April 1944
- Identification: Pennant number: R98 later changed to D298
- Motto: Spensione provoco - I challenge with a wager
- Honours and awards: Okinawa 1945
- Fate: Sold to Yugoslavia in October 1956
- Badge: On a Field White, a cross Blue charged with five bessants within a horseshoe inverted Red.

History

Yugoslavia
- Name: Pula
- Namesake: City of Pula
- Acquired: October 1956
- Fate: Decommissioned in 1971 and sold for scrapping
- Notes: Pennant number: R22

General characteristics
- Class & type: W-class destroyer
- Displacement: 1,710 tons (1,730 tonnes); 2,530 tons full (2,570 tonnes)
- Length: 362.75 ft (110.57 m) o/a
- Beam: 35.75 ft (10.90 m)
- Draught: 10 ft (3.0 m)
- Propulsion: 2 Admiralty 3-drum boilers, Parsons single-reduction geared steam turbines, 40,000 shp (30 MW), 2 shafts
- Speed: 36 knots (67 km/h) / 32 knots (59 km/h) full
- Range: 4,675 nmi (8,658 km) at 20 knots (37 km/h)
- Complement: 225
- Sensors & processing systems: Radar Type 272 target indication; Radar Type 291 air warning; Radar Type 285 fire control on director Mk.III(W); Radar Type 282 fire control on 40 mm mount Mk.IV
- Armament: 4 × QF 4.7-inch (120 mm) Mk.IX guns on single mounts CP Mk.XXII; 4 × QF 2-pounder (40 mm) Mk.VIII guns on quad mount Mk.VII; 4 × A/A mountings; twin 20 mm Oerlikon Mk.V; single Bofors 40-mm Mk.III guns; single QF 2 pdr Mk.XVI; 8 (4x2) tubes for 21-inch (533 mm) torpedoes Mk.IX; 2 racks & 4 throwers for 70 depth charges

HMS Wager was a W-class destroyer of the Royal Navy that served in the Second World War. She was sold to the Yugoslav Navy in 1956, renamed Pula, and scrapped in 1971.

== Construction and commissioning ==
Wager was ordered in December 1941 and was laid down at the Clydebank yards of John Brown and Company. She was launched on 1 November 1943 and commissioned into service on 14 April 1944.

== Second World War service ==
On commissioning and work up Wager was assigned to the 27th Destroyer Flotilla and was initially deployed for screening ships of the Home Fleet. She spent July 1944 under refit and sailed in August to join the Eastern Fleet at Ceylon. Her role was to screen major fleet units including the aircraft carrier Indomitable.

Wager took part in further screening operations in January, covering fleet units for Operation Meridian, before sailing for Fremantle at the end of the month with the ships of Force 63. They arrived on 4 February, before transferring to Sydney, where they carried out exercises with elements of the US Navy. They sailed on 28 February to join the British Pacific Fleet at its forward base at Manus, in the Admiralty Islands. The force, designated Task Force 113 carried out screening duties throughout March, before being assigned to the United States Fifth Fleet on 22 March. Wager remained on station throughout April, before sailing for the US Forward-base at Leyte, arriving there on 20 April.

On 4 May Wager sailed for Sydney and was under refit during June 1945. She then transferred to the US 3rd Fleet and was present at the Surrender of Japan in Tokyo Bay on 2 September 1945.

== Post war ==
Wager remained with the British Pacific Fleet, based in Hong Kong until December 1945. She returned to Portsmouth in January 1946 where she was reduced to the reserve. She spent two years in the reserve, before transferring to Simonstown, South Africa. She returned to Britain in 1955 before being placed on the disposal list.

== Transfer to Yugoslav Navy ==
Wager and her sister, Kempenfelt, were sold to Yugoslavia in 1956, being towed to Yugoslavia for a refit in October. She was renamed R-22 Pula and was re-commissioned in late 1959. She served until being decommissioned and scrapped in 1971.
