= HMS Wrangler (R48) =

W-class destroyer converted to Type 15 frigate of the Royal Navy

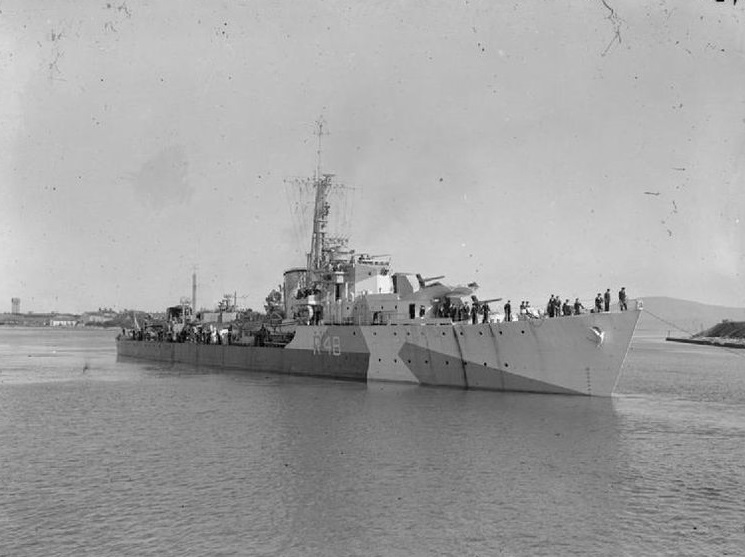
- Wrangler at anchor, June 1944

History

United Kingdom
- Name: Wrangler
- Ordered: 3 December 1941
- Builder: Vickers Armstrong, Barrow-in-Furness
- Laid down: 23 September 1942
- Launched: 29 September 1943
- Completed: 14 July 1944
- Identification: Pennant number: R48/F157
- Fate: Sold to South African Navy, 29 November 1956

South Africa
- Namesake: Orange Free State Province
- Acquired: 29 November 1956
- Renamed: Vrystaat
- Identification: Pennant number: F157
- Fate: Sunk as target 14 April 1976

General characteristics (as built)
- Class & type: W-class destroyer
- Displacement: 1,710 long tons (1,740 t) (standard load); 2,530 long tons (2,570 t) (deep load)
- Length: 362 ft 9 in (110.6 m)
- Beam: 35 ft 8 in (10.9 m)
- Draught: 14 ft 6 in (4.4 m) (deep load)
- Installed power: 2 Admiralty 3-drum boilers; 40,000 shp (30,000 kW)
- Propulsion: 2 shafts; 2 × geared steam turbines
- Speed: 36 knots (67 km/h; 41 mph)
- Range: 4,675 nmi (8,658 km; 5,380 mi) at 20 knots (37 km/h; 23 mph)
- Complement: 179
- Sensors & processing systems: ASDIC; Type 272 surface-search radar; Type 282 and 285 gunnery radars; Type 291 early-warning radar
- Armament: 4 × single 4.7-inch (120 mm) guns; 1 × twin Bofors 40 mm (1.6 in) AA guns; 4 × twin Oerlikon 20 mm (0.8 in) AA guns; 2 × quadruple 21 inch (533 mm) torpedo tubes; 70 depth charges; 4 throwers, 2 rails

General characteristics (where different)
- Class & type: Type 15 frigate
- Displacement: 2,300 long tons (2,300 t) (standard); 2,700 long tons (2,700 t) (deep)
- Speed: 31 knots (57 km/h; 36 mph) (deep load)
- Complement: 174
- Sensors & processing systems: Types 170 and 174 ASDIC; Type 277Q surface-search radar; Type 274 navigation radar; Type 293Q gunnery radar
- Armament: 1 × twin 4-inch (102 mm) guns; 1 × twin Bofors 40 mm (1.6 in) AA guns; 2 × triple-barrelled Squid anti-submarine mortars

HMS Wrangler was one of eight W-class destroyers built for the Royal Navy during World War II. Completed in 1944, the ship spent most of the war in the Far East and escorted British aircraft carriers as their aircraft attacked targets in the occupied Dutch East Indies and in Japan itself. Wrangler was present in Tokyo Bay when the Japanese formally surrendered on 2 September 1945.

She served as a training ship after the war until she was converted into a Type 15 frigate in the early 1950s and subsequently sold to the South African Navy later that decade. The ship was renamed Vrystaat in South African service and made many overseas port visits before corrosion problems caused her to be reduced to reserve in 1963. Vrystaat was sunk as a target by a South African submarine in 1976.

== Description ==
The W-class ships displaced 1,710 long tons (1,740 t) at standard load and 2,530 long tons (2,570 t) at deep load. They had an overall length of 362 feet 9 inches (110.6 m), a beam of 35 feet 8 inches (10.9 m) and a mean deep draught of 14 feet 6 inches (4.4 m). The ships were powered by a pair of Parsons geared steam turbines, each driving one propeller shaft, using steam provided by two Admiralty three-drum boilers. The turbines developed a total of 40,000 indicated horsepower (30,000 kW) which gave a maximum speed of 36 knots (67 km/h; 41 mph). They carried 615 long tons (625 t) of fuel oil that gave them a range of 4,675 nautical miles (8,658 km; 5,380 mi) at 20 knots (37 km/h; 23 mph). Their crew numbered 179 officers and ratings.

The W-class destroyers were armed with four single 4.7-inch (120 mm) Mark IX guns, two 40-millimetre (1.6 in) Bofors anti-aircraft (AA) guns on a twin mount and eight Oerlikon 20-millimetre (0.8 in) light AA guns on twin mounts. They also were equipped with two quadruple mounts for 21 inch (533 mm) torpedo tubes. For anti-submarine work, the ships were fitted with ASDIC and two rails and four throwers for 70 depth charges. They were equipped with a Type 272 surface-search radar, Type 282 and 285 gunnery radars and a Type 291 early-warning radar.

=== Type 15 conversion ===
In 1951, Wrangler became the first ship of her class to be converted into a Type 15 anti-submarine frigate. This was a major reconstruction that involved the removal of the superstructure, masts and armament as well most of the internal equipment. To increase the usable volume of the hull and to improve crew comfort, the forecastle deck was extended almost all the way to the stern and a new superstructure was built above it, made of aluminium to reduce topweight. Two lattice masts were added to carry the Type 277Q surface-search, Type 274 navigation, and Type 293Q gunnery radars. The ship's main gun armament now consisted of a twin-gun turret fitted with 4-inch (102 mm) Mk XVI guns mounted aft and a water-cooled, twin-gun Mk V mount for 40 mm Bofors guns above the bridge. The pair of triple-barrelled Squid anti-submarine mortars were shifted to the quarterdeck aft and were controlled by Type 170 and 174 ASDIC systems.

These changes greatly increased the ships' displacement, now 2,300 long tons (2,300 t) at standard load and 2,700 long tons (2,700 t) at deep load. This reduced their speed to a maximum of 31 knots (57 km/h; 36 mph) at deep load and the crew now numbered 174 officers and ratings.

== Construction and career ==
The W-class destroyers were ordered on 3 December 1941 and Wrangler was laid down by Vickers-Armstrongs at its shipyard in Barrow-in-Furness on 23 September 1942. The ship was launched on 30 December 1943 and completed on 14 July 1944. She was assigned to the 27th Destroyer Flotilla, together with all of her sister ships, upon completion and Wrangler was working up at Scapa Flow with the Home Fleet from 21 July to 16 August. She then proceeded to the Mediterranean for several months before she was assigned to the Eastern Fleet by late 1944. During Operation Robson, an aerial attack on the oil refinery complex at Pangkalan Brandan, Sumatra, in mid-December, Wrangler escorted the main body of the fleet. Afterwards, the ship sailed to Bombay, India, to have her boiler tubes replaced, a lengthy job that took from 14 January to 19 May 1945. By 17 July, the ship was en route, together with her sister Wakeful to reinforce the British Pacific Fleet operating off the coast of Japan. On 20 August she was selected to remain with the aircraft carrier HMS Indefatigable as part of the British contribution to the occupation forces. Wrangler was present when the Japanese surrendered on 2 September aboard the battleship USS Missouri in Tokyo Bay.

The ship ferried Allied prisoners of war back to Australia before departing Sydney on 8 November and arrived at Plymouth on 16 December. The navy originally intended to reduce her to Category B reserve, but decided to assign Wrangler to the Naval Training Command on 18 January 1946 and she became the chemical warfare training ship based at Devonport Royal Dockyard. From September 1946 until 1950 the ship was with the Rosyth Local Flotilla as a boys' training ship and had her 40 mm guns removed during her December 1946 – January 1947 refit. Two years later Wrangler was in a collision that damaged her Carley floats and main deck plating. In 1950–51 she was assigned to the 4th Training Flotilla. The ship was allocated to the Type 15 programme on 4 January 1950 and sailed to Devonport in February 1951 to prepare for the reconstruction. From June 1951 to 10 March 1953 she was rebuilt by Harland & Wolff at Belfast, Northern Ireland, with the new pennant number F157. On recommissioning in 1953 she took part in the Fleet Review to celebrate the Coronation of Queen Elizabeth II. Between 1953 and 1955 she served as part of the 5th Frigate Squadron in the Mediterranean. In 1954 Wrangler was involved in the search for wreckage of the BOAC de Havilland Comet airliner G-ALYP, that crashed in the Mediterranean Sea near the island of Elba. On 4 February 1955, she ran aground at Villefranche sur Mer, France; she was refloated on 6 February 1955 by French Navy and Italian Navy tugs.

=== South African service ===
In 1956 Wrangler was sold to South Africa for £1,425,000 "as is" and refitted between November and January 1957 in Cardiff by the Mount Stuart Dry Dock Company. She was commissioned into the SAN on 29 November 1956 and subsequently renamed as SAS Vrystaat. Captain M.R. Terry-Lloyd was in command when the ship was formally accepted by the High Commissioner for the Union of South Africa, Dr. J. E. Holloway, at a ceremony in Devonport on 10 January 1957. Vrystaat departed England on 22 January and arrived in South Africa on 19 February after having made port visits en route. Shortly after her arrival, the ship was sent to Marion Island to take off a resident who urgently needed to go to hospital. Later that year, she was sent to Portuguese Mozambique with several other South African ships. Now assigned to the 10th Frigate Squadron, Vrystaat and the frigate Good Hope visited the city of Matadi in the Belgian Congo, some 70 miles (110 km) up the Congo River, in 1958. Two years later the ship, now under the command of Captain John Fairbairn, was sent to Portugal to participate in the naval review commemorating of the quincentenary of the death of Infante Henry the Navigator. In 1961, Vrystaat visited the city of Lourenco Marques (now Maputo) in Portuguese Mozambique.

By 1963 many of her aluminium rivets were deteriorating and there were significant galvanic corrosion problems where the aluminium superstructure joined with the steel hull. Deemed too expensive to repair, the ship was placed in reserve in Simon's Town that year. Vrystaat was towed out to sea by the frigate President Steyn on 14 April 1976 and was sunk as a target by the submarine SAS Maria van Riebeeck, eight nautical miles (15 km; 9.2 mi) southwest of Cape Point.
