= 1830 Naval Air Squadron =

Inactive Royal Navy Fleet Air Arm and Reserve Air Squadron

- Squadron badge
- Active: 1943–1945; 1947–1957
- Disbanded: 10 March 1957
- Country: United Kingdom
- Branch: Royal Navy
- Type: Single-seat fighter squadron; Royal Naval Volunteer Reserve Air Squadron
- Role: Carrier-based fighter squadron; Anti-submarine squadron (RNVR)
- Size: Ten / eighteen aircraft (1943-45)
- Part of: Fleet Air Arm
- Home station: See Naval air stations section for full list.
- Motto: 'Force on'
- Aircraft: See Aircraft flown section for full list.
- Engagements: World War II: Pacific War; Operation Cockpit; Operation Transom; Operation Councillor; Operation Pedal; Operation Crimson; Operation Robson; Operation Meridian; Operation Iceberg
- Decorations: Boyd Trophy 1949
- Battle honours: East Indies 1944; Sabang 1944; Palembang 1945; Okinawa 1945

Commanders
- Notable commanders: Lieutenant Commander(A) A.M. Tritton, DSC, RNVR

Insignia
- Squadron Badge Description: Blue, in base barry wavy of six white and blue two torches in saltire gold inflamed proper (1944)
- Identification Markings: 7A+ (Corsair); A7A+ (December 1944); 111-128 (March 1945); 201-261 (Firefly/Harvard); 320-322 (Avenger); 800-807 (Avenger January 1956)
- Fin Carrier/Shore Codes: Q (March 1945); AC:DO (Firefly/Harvard); AC (Avenger January 1956)

1830 Naval Air Squadron (1830 NAS) was a Fleet Air Arm (FAA) naval air squadron of the United Kingdom's Royal Navy (RN) between 1943 and 1945 and then a Royal Naval Volunteer Reserve Air Squadron from 1947 to 1957. Established at HMS Saker II, RNAS Quonset Point, United States, in June 1943, the squadron began as a fighter unit equipped with Vought Corsair. In September the squadron boarded HMS Slinger for transport to the United Kingdom, arriving in HMS Gadwall, RNAS Belfast and relocating to HMS Blackcap, RNAS Stretton. By early December 1943 the squadron had become part of the 15th Naval Fighter Wing. It embarked in HMS Illustrious, conducting training exercises in the Firth of Clyde while utilising HMS Landrail, RNAS Machrihanish, as a land base. In early January 1944 the carrier set sail for Ceylon to join the Eastern Fleet, initially using RAF China Bay as a shore station. The squadron conducted fighter sweeps over the Bay of Bengal, followed by strikes on shore facilities and shipping at Sabang in April 1944 and later at Sourabaya and the Andaman Islands in June, before returning to Sabang in July. HMS Illustrious underwent a refit in Durban, during which the squadron was stationed at HMS Malagas, RNAS Wingfield. Upon returning to Ceylon in November, the squadron supported attacks on oil refineries and harbors in Sumatra in December 1944 and January 1945, prior to the carrier's integration into the British Pacific Fleet. From March to April operations targeted airfields in the Sakishima Gunto. A near miss from a Kamikaze attack caused significant damage to HMS Illustrious, leading to her withdrawal in April and subsequent return to the UK, where the squadron was disbanded in July 1945. It was re-established mainly as an anti-submarine squadron within the Royal Naval Volunteer Reserve Air Branch, subsequently becoming part of the Scottish Air Division, from 1947 until its disbandment in 1957.

== History ==
=== Single-seat fighter squadron (1943-1945) ===
On 1 April 1943 the personnel of 1830 Naval Air Squadron gathered at RNAS Lee-on-Solent (HMS Daedalus), Hampshire, before departing for the United States. They arrived at the US Naval Air Station Quonset Point in Rhode Island, known as RNAS Quonset Point (HMS Saker II), the Admiralty obtained access to this facility beginning in October 1942 and were officially established as a single-seat fighter squadron on 1 June 1943 under the leadership of Lieutenant Commander D.B.M. Fiddes, DSO, RN.

Initial equipment was ten Vought Corsair fighter aircraft. The variant in question were the F4U-1 type, constructed by Vought Chance, which were designated as the Corsair Mk I within the Fleet Air Arm. Following the acclimatisation to the aircraft and associated equipment, the squadron commenced rigorous training to ready itself for active deployment. The flying training encompassed navigation drills, low-altitude manoeuvres, formation flying, combat strategies, Aerodrome Dummy Deck Landing (ADDL) practice, and night flying exercises.

In August the squadron received Corsair Mk II aircraft, which replaced the initial equipment, these were the Vought Chance built F4U-1A variant of the fighter aircraft. This was prior to their relocation to the US Naval Air Station Brunswick in Maine on 21 September for ongoing training. Subsequently, the squadron was set to operate from US Naval Auxiliary Air Facility Sanford, Maine, a satellite airfield for USNAS Brunswick.

Upon finishing their preparations, the squadron departed for the RN Air Section at USNAS Norfolk, Virginia, on 9 October for their embarkation in the Ruler-class escort carrier, HMS Slinger, for passage to the UK. HMS Slinger left Norfolk en route to New York. It then set sail with convoy UT.4 from New York on 21 October. The squadron disembarked at the Royal Naval Aircraft Yard in Belfast, Norther Ireland on 1 November.

On 3 November 1830, along with 1831, and 1833 Naval Air Squadrons, relocated to RNAS Stretton (HMS Blackcap), Cheshire, where they established the new 15th Naval Fighter Wing (15 Wing) on the 8th designated for service aboard the fleet carrier and name ship of her class, HMS Illustrious, under the command of Lieutenant Commander J.W. Sleigh, DSC, RN. In December 1943 the squadron's strength was augmented by incorporating aircraft from 1831 Naval Air Squadron, which was in the process of disbanding.

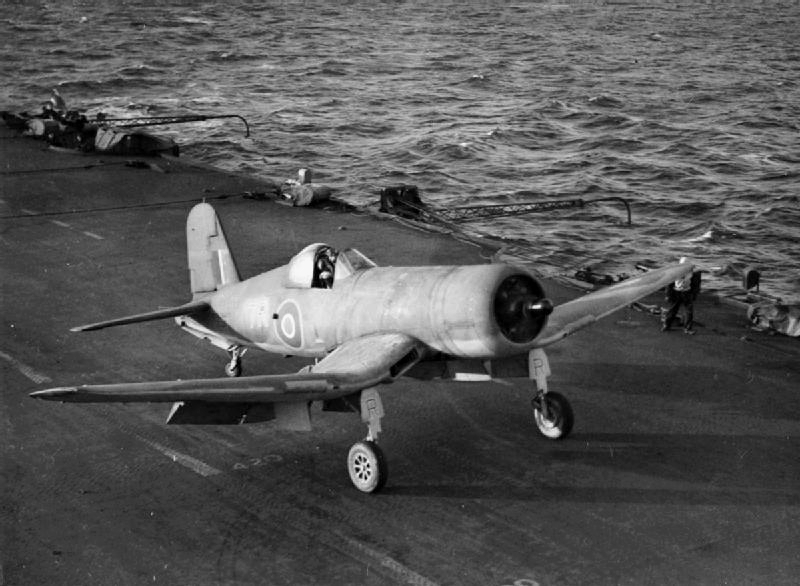
Vought Corsair Mk II, from 1830 Naval Air Squadron, after landing aboard the aircraft carrier HMS Illustrious (87) in December 1943

On 9 December 1830 Naval Air Squadron departed to join HMS Illustrious for training exercises in the Clyde, utilising RNAS Machrihanish (HMS Landrail) in Argyll and Bute as its shore base. The carrier set sail from the Clyde, to integrate with the Eastern Fleet. HMS Illustrious reached Trincomalee, Ceylon, on 28 January, where the Vought Corsair from 15 Wing were deployed to the RN Air Section at China Bay, which served as its shore station. In March, a three-day operation named Operation Initial was conducted in the Bay of Bengal to demonstrate military presence in the region and to facilitate training for the Fleet. This was succeeded by an additional naval training exercise known as Diplomat.

Subsequently, active operations were conducted by the squadron and wing from April to July 1944. Operation Cockpit, conducted from 16 April to 19, involved air strikes carried out by Fleet Air Arm and United States Navy aircraft targeting the harbor infrastructure, oil storage tanks, shipping vessels, aircraft, and facilities located at Lho Nga airfield in Sabang, situated on the island of Pulau Weh at the northern extremity of Sumatra. Operation Transom took place from 6 May to 18. The Eastern Fleet departed from Trincomalee to execute Operation Transom, which involved an assault by Allied forces on the Japanese-held city of Surabaya, located on the Indonesian island of Java, scheduled for 17 May.

Operation Councillor was conducted from 10 June to 13 as a strategic manoeuvre in the Indian Ocean designed to divert Japanese focus away from American military activities in the Marianas Islands. Operation Pedal was conducted from 19 to 21 June and involved an airstrike launched from aircraft carriers targeting Japanese installations at Port Blair and various sites within the Andaman Islands in the Bay of Bengal. Lastly, Operation Crimson which was conducted from 22 to 27 July and involved a co-ordinated naval bombardment and aerial assaults targeting Japanese airfields located in the Indonesian cities of Sabang, Lhoknga, and Kutaraja on the island of Sumatra. Carrier-based aircraft played a crucial role in neutralising the airfields and offering air support for the forces engaged in the bombardment.

HMS Illustrious departed from Trincomalee on 30 July for a refit in South Africa, reaching Cape Town on 9 August. On 11 August the aircraft from 15 Wing were transferred ashore to RNAS Wingfield (HMS Malagas), Cape Town. The squadron was expanded to include eighteen aircraft following the disbandment of 1838 Naval Air Squadron, which took place upon its arrival at RNAS Wingfield on 12 September. Following completion of her refit, HMS Illustrious returned to Trincomalee, arriving on 1 November, with the two squadrons of 15 Wing disembarking during the journey. 1830 Naval Air Squadron proceeded to RNAS Colombo Racecourse (HMS Berhunda), Colombo, Ceylon.

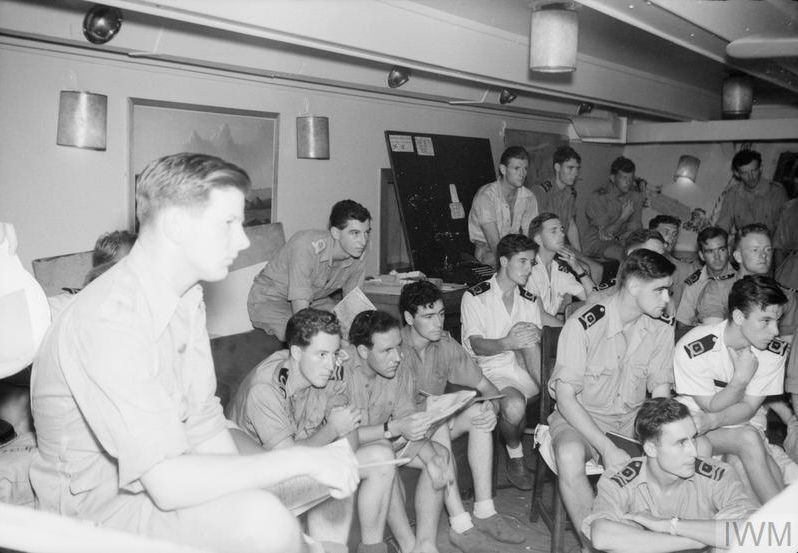
Pilots of 15th Naval Fighter Wing on board HMS Illustrious being briefed for an operation in 1944.

On 22 November HMS Illustrious along with her squadrons was reassigned to the newly established British Pacific Fleet (BPF). Then, Operation Robson was conducted from 17 to 22 December and involved an aerial assault targeting Japanese oil facilities located at Pangkalan Brandan on the northwestern coast of Sumatra, within the Japanese-occupied territory of the Dutch East Indies. Next was Operation Meridian which targeted Japanese oil resources in the Palembang region of southern Sumatra. Operation Iceberg subsequently commenced, aimed at neutralising six airfields located within the Sakishima Gunto.

Following damage sustained from a near miss by a Kamikaze and experiencing numerous mechanical issues, HMS Illustrious withdrew from the operational line on 14 April to undergo a significant refit in the United Kingdom. Upon departing from the aircraft in Australia, a significant number of the original members of 1830 Naval Air Squadron rejoined the ship. The squadron was planned to reorganise with Vought Corsair fighter aircraft prior to rejoining the British Pacific Fleet as part of the 6th Carrier Air Group. However, upon its arrival in the United Kingdom on 28 June 1945, the squadron was disbanded instead.

== Royal Naval Volunteer Reserve Air Squadron ==
1830 Naval Air Squadron reformed at RNAS Abbotsinch (HMS Sanderling) (now Glasgow Airport) in Renfrewshire on 15 August 1947 as part of the Royal Navy Volunteer Reserve, equipped with three Fairey Firefly FR.1 fighter/reconnaissance aircraft and three Supermarine Seafire F Mk.17 fighter aircraft. The squadron was under the leadership of Lieutenant Commander(A) J.D. Murricane, DSC, RNVR. However, in May 1948 the fighter role was dropped and 1830 Naval Air Squadron standardised on Fairey Firefy aircraft.

Flight operations were conducted at RNAS Abbotsinch on weekends. Pilots and Observers were mandated to complete fourteen days of continuous training annually, alongside one-hundred hours of non-continuous training (drills), and to serve on squadron duty for twelve weekends. Throughout this period, they were expected to accumulate a minimum of seventy-five flying hours and a maximum of one-hundred and twenty-five flying hours.

The two-week annual training program was conducted at various naval air stations, starting with RNAS Eglinton (HMS Gannet), County Londonderry, Northern Ireland, from 16 August to 30 1948. In August and September 1949 the squadron joined HMS Illustrious for the squadron's inaugural embarkation period during its annual training. As a result of their performance, they were awarded The Boyd Trophy for achieving 205 deck landings without any accidents that year.

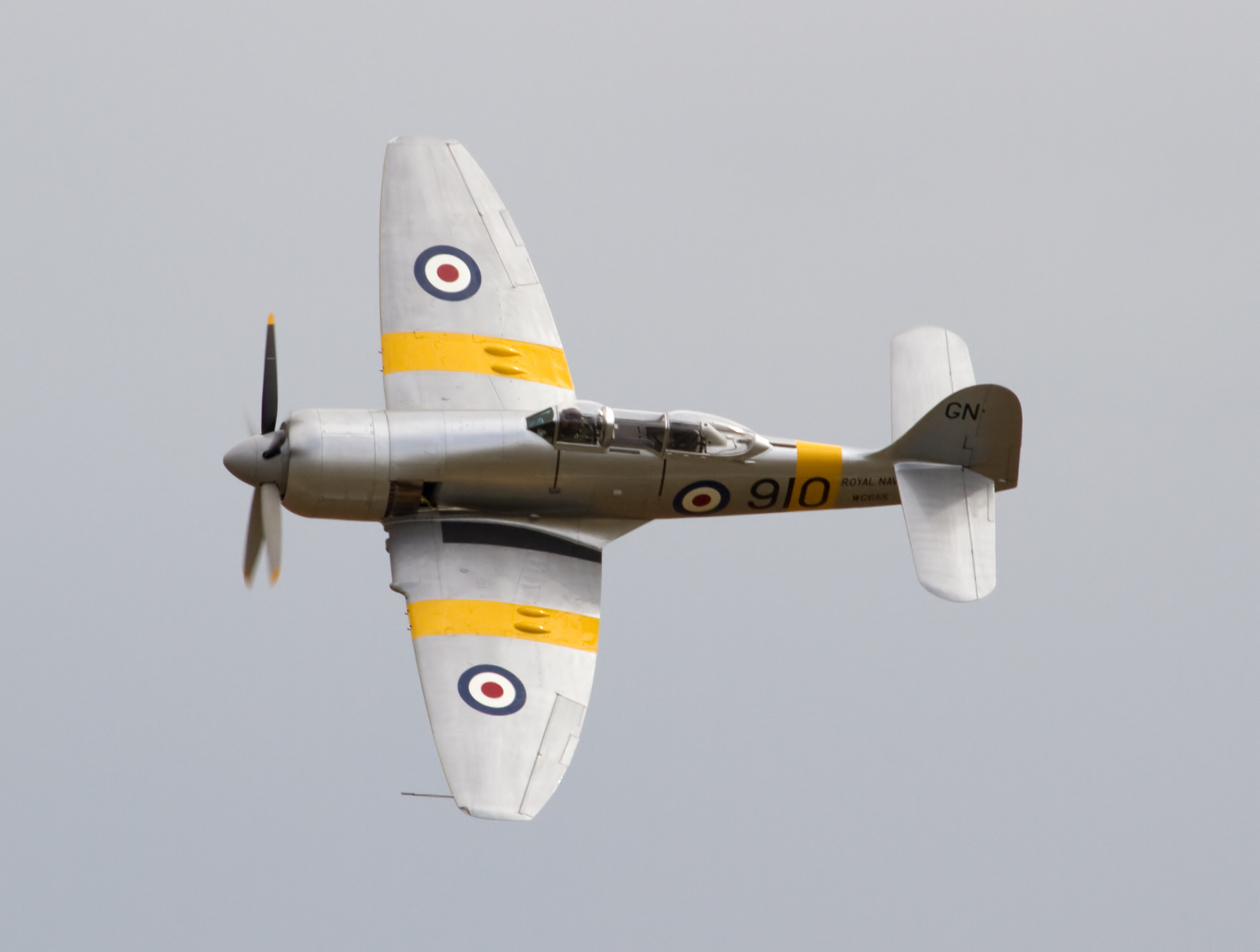
Hawker Sea Fury T.20; an example of the type used

In December 1950 the squadron relocated to RNAS Donibristle (HMS Merlin), Fife, on a temporary basis to facilitate the reconstruction of the runways at RNAS Abbotsinch. The subsequent year, it was equipped with Fairey Firefly AS.Mk 6 anti-submarine aircraft.

On 1 June 1952 the Royal Naval Volunteer Reserve Air Branch underwent a reorganisation, resulting in the establishment of five divisions: Scottish, Northern, Midland, Southern, and Channel. The Scottish Air Division was created at RNAS Donibristle and initially included only 1830 Naval Air Squadron. However, on 1 October 1952, 1830A Naval Air Squadron was established as a second RNVR Anti-Submarine squadron, utilising the aircraft from 1830 Naval Air Squadron. In March 1953 it was renamed 1843 Naval Air Squadron.

Returning to RNAS Abbotsinch on 1 November 1952, some Fairey Firefly AS.5 anti-submarine aircraft were received in 1953, but in November 1955 the squadron re-equipped with Grumman Avenger AS5 anti-submarine strike version. As a result of reductions in defense spending, the Royal Naval Volunteer Reserve Air Branch was disbanded in 1957, leading to the dissolution of the organisation and its squadrons on 10 March 1957.

== Aircraft flown ==
1830 Naval Air Squadron flew different variants of only one aircraft type during the Second World War but a number of different types and variants while a RNVR squadron:

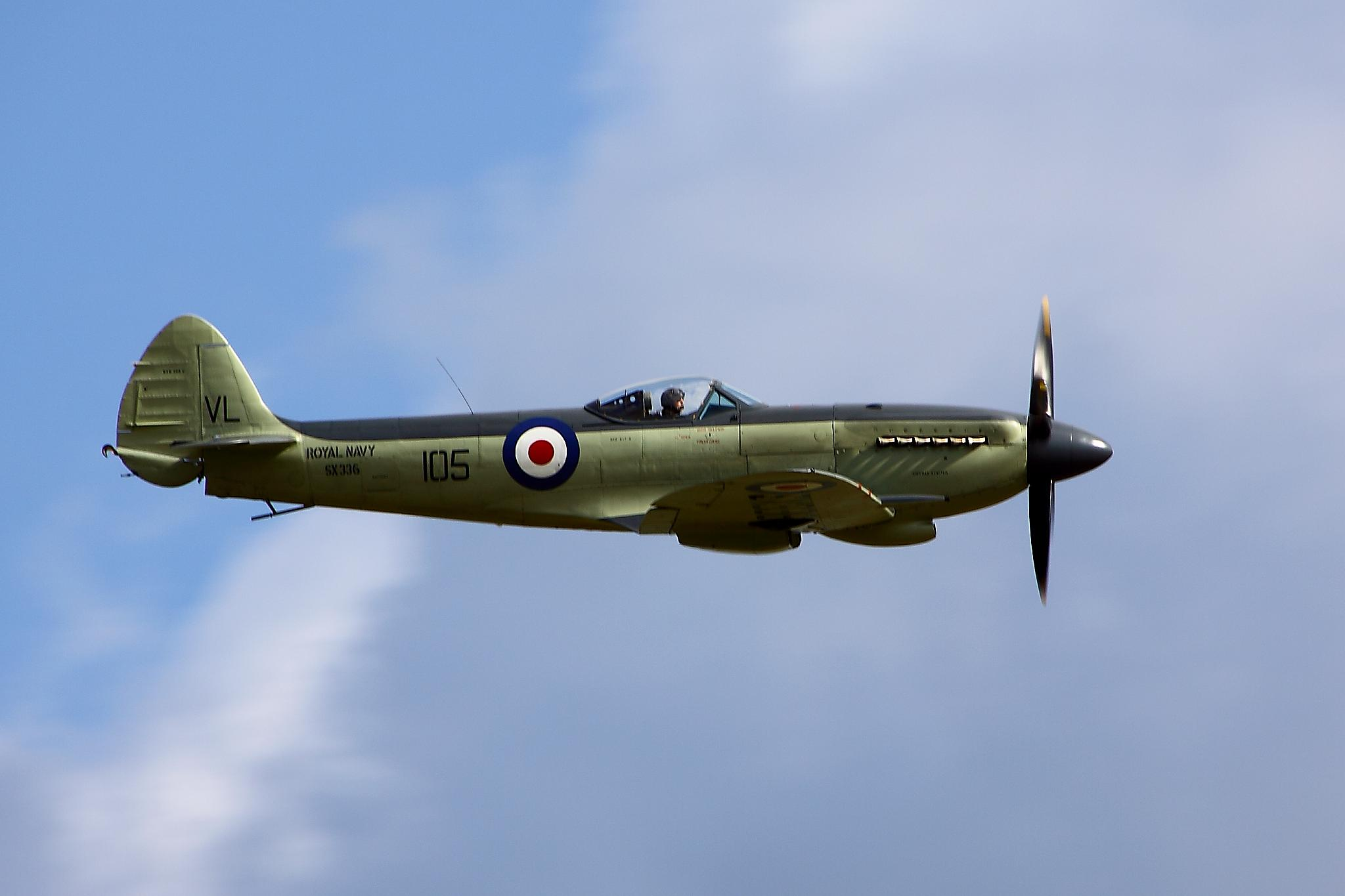
Supermarine Seafire F Mk.17

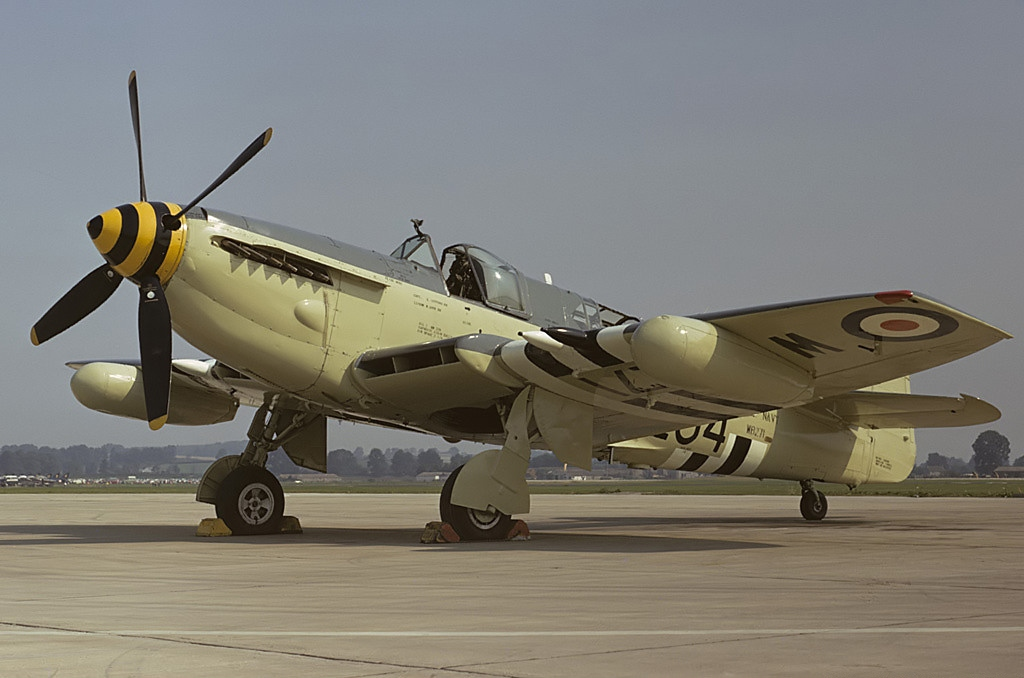
Fairey Firefly AS.Mk 5

- Vought Corsair Mk I fighter aircraft (June - August 1943)
- Vought Corsair Mk II fighter aircraft (August 1943 - May 1945)
- Fairey Firefly FR.1 fighter/reconnaissance aircraft (August 1947 - October 1951)
- Supermarine Seafire F Mk.17 fighter aircraft (August 1947 - May 1948)
- Fairey Firefly T.Mk 1 twin-cockpit pilot training aircraft (June 1948 - November 1949)
- North American Harvard IIB advanced trainer aircraft (January 1950 - October 1954)
- North American Harvard III advanced trainer aircraft (January 1950 - March 1955)
- Fairey Firefly T.Mk 2 twin-cockpit armed operational training aircraft (October 1950 - November 1955)
- Fairey Firefly T.Mk 3 anti-submarine warfare training aircraft (October 1950 - October 1951)
- Fairey Firefly AS.Mk 6 anti-submarine aircraft (October 1951 - November 1955)
- Hawker Sea Fury T.20 two-seat training aircraft (October 1952 - October 1954)
- Percival Sea Prince T.1 anti-submarine training aircraft (July 1953 - March 1956)
- Fairey Firefly AS.Mk 5 anti-submarine aircraft (August 1953 - November 1955)
- Airspeed Oxford training aircraft (September 1953 - January 1955)
- Boulton Paul Sea Balliol T.21 advanced trainer aircraft (October 1954 - January 1957)
- Grumman Avenger AS5 anti-submarine strike aircraft (November 1955 - January 1957)

== Battle honours ==
The battle honours awarded to 1830 Naval Air Squadron are:

- East Indies 1944
- Sabang 1944
- Palembang 1945
- Okinawa 1945

== Assignments ==
1830 Naval Air Squadron was assigned as needed to form part of a number of larger units:

- 15th Naval Fighter Wing (8 November 1943 - 28 July 1945)
- Royal Naval Volunteer Reserve Scottish Air Division (1 June 1952 - 10 March 1957)

== Naval air stations ==
1830 Naval Air Squadron operated mostly from a number of naval air stations of the Royal Navy in the UK and overseas, a Royal Navy fleet carrier and an escort carrier:

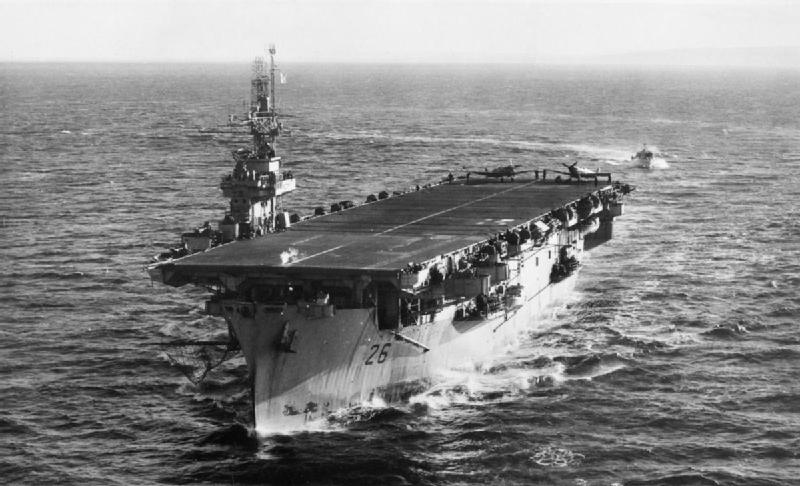
HMS Slinger

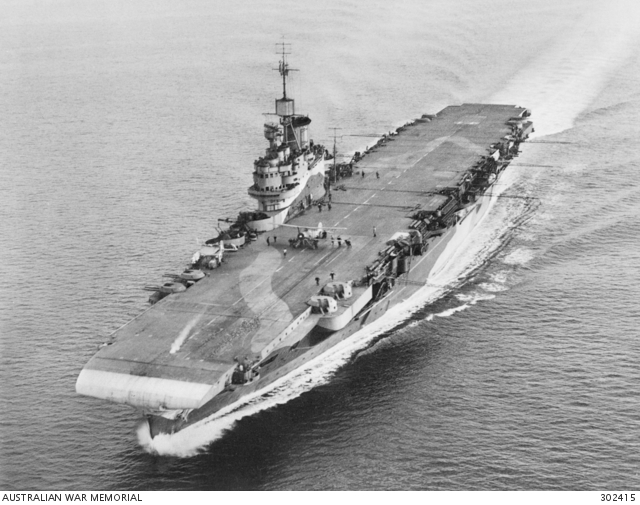
HMS Illustrious

1943 - 1945

- Royal Naval Air Station Quonset Point (HMS Saker II), Rhode Island, (1 June - 3 September 1943)
- RN Air Section Brunswick, Maine, (3 - 22 September 1943)
  - RN Air Section Norfolk, Virginia, (Detachment six aircraft, Deck Landing Training (DLT), USS Charger, 14–21 September 1943)
- Naval Auxiliary Air Facility Sanford, Maine, (22 September - 9 October 1943)
- HMS Slinger (9 October - 2 November 1943)
- Royal Naval Air Station Belfast (HMS Gadwall), County Antrim, (2 - 3 November 1943)
- Royal Naval Air Station Stretton (HMS Blackcap), Cheshire, (3 November - 9 December 1943)
- HMS Illustrious (9 December 1943 - 28 January 1944)
  - Royal Naval Air Station Machrihanish (HMS Landrail), Argyll and Bute, (Detachment ten aircraft, 20–23 December 1943)
- RN Air Section China Bay, Ceylon, (28 January - 10 February 1944)
- HMS Illustrious (10 - 14 February 1944)
- RN Air Section China Bay, Ceylon, (14 February - 21 March 1944)
- HMS Illustrious (21 - 31 March 1944)
- RN Air Section China Bay, Ceylon, (31 March - 13 April 1944)
- HMS Illustrious (13 April - 11 August 1944)
- Royal Naval Air Station Wingfield (HMS Malagas), Cape Town, (11 August - 13 October 1944)
- HMS Illustrious (13 October - 2 November 1944)
- Royal Naval Air Station Colombo Racecourse (HMS Berhunda), Ceylon, (2 - 17 November 1944)
- Royal Naval Air Station Puttalam (HMS Rajaliya), Ceylon, (17 - 27 November 1944)
  - RN Air Section China Bay (Detachment eight aircraft, 21–25 November 1944)
- Royal Naval Air Station Katukurunda (HMS Ukussa), Ceylon, (27 - 29 November 1944)
- HMS Illustrious (29 November 1944 - 9 February 1945)
  - Royal Naval Air Station Trincomalee (HMS Bambara), Ceylon, (Detachment seven aircraft, 22 December 1944 - 12 January 1945)
- Royal Naval Air Station Nowra (HMS Nabbington), New South Wales, (9 February - 7 March 1945)
- HMS Illustrious (7 March - 14 May 1945)
- Royal Naval Air Station Bankstown (HMS Nabberley), Sydney, (14 - 24 May 1945)
- HMS Illustrious (passage) (24 May - 28 June 1945)
- disbanded UK - (28 June 1945)

1947-1957

- Royal Naval Air Station Abbotsinch (HMS Sanderling), Renfrewshire, (15 August 1947 - 2 December 1950)
- Royal Naval Air Station Donibristle (HMS Merlin), Fife, (2 December 1950 - 1 November 1952)
- Royal Naval Air Station Abbotsinch (HMS Sanderling), Renfrewshire, (1 November 1952 - 12 June 1953)
- Royal Naval Air Station Culham (HMS Hornbill), Oxfordshire, (12 - 15 June 1953)
- Royal Naval Air Station Abbotsinch (HMS Sanderling), Renfrewshire, (15 June 1953 - 10 March 1957)
  - Valkenburg Naval Air Base, Katwijk, Netherlands, (Detachment, 13–17 September 1956)
  Annual training
  - Royal Naval Air Station Eglinton (HMS Gannet), County Londonderry, (16 - 30 August 1948)
  - HMS Illustrious (27 August - 10 September 1949)
  - Royal Naval Air Station Hal Far (HMS Falcon), Malta, (1 - 10 August 1950)
  - HMS Vengeance (2 - 13 July 1951)
  - Royal Naval Air Station Eglinton (HMS Gannet), County Londonderry, (13 - 26 July 1952)
  - Royal Naval Air Station Hal Far (HMS Falcon), Malta, (24 August - 5 September 1953)
  - Royal Naval Air Station Culdrose (HMS Seahawk), Cornwall, (10 - 24 June 1954)
  - Royal Naval Air Station Hal Far (HMS Falcon), Malta, (8 - 21 May 1955)
- disbanded - (10 March 1957)

== Commanding officers ==
List of commanding officers of 1830 Naval Air Squadron with date of appointment:

Note: Abbreviation (A) signifies Air Branch of the RN or RNVR.

1943 - 1945

- Lieutenant Commander D.B.M Fiddes, DSO, RN, from 1 June 1943 (KiFA 12 December 1943
- Lieutenant Commander(A) A.M. Tritton, DSC, RNVR, from 18 December 1943
- disbanded - 28 June 1945

1947 - 1957

- Lieutenant Commander(A) J.D. Murricane, DSC, RNVR, from 15 August 1947
- Lieutenant Commander(A) R.C. Read, RNVR, from 1 June 1952
- disbanded - 10 March 1957

== See also ==
- British Pacific Fleet
