= 15th Naval Fighter Wing =

Royal Navy Fleet Air Arm aircraft wing

- White Ensign
- Active: November 1943 – July 1945
- Disbanded: 28 July 1945
- Country: United Kingdom
- Branch: Royal Navy
- Type: Naval fighter Wing
- Role: Carrier-based fighter
- Size: Two / three squadrons
- Part of: Fleet Air Arm
- Aircraft carrier: HMS Illustrious
- Engagements: World War II: Indian Ocean in World War II; Operation Cockpit; Operation Transom; Operation Pedal; Operation Crimson; Operation Robson; Operation Meridian; Pacific War; Operation Iceberg

Commanders
- Notable commanders: Lieutenant Commander J.W. Sleigh, DSC, RN; Lieutenant Commander(A) R.J. Cork, DSO, DSC, RN; Lieutenant Commander(A) A. M. Tritton, DSC and 2 Bars, RNVR

Insignia
- Wing Code: A

Aircraft flown
- Fighter: Vought Corsair

15th Naval Fighter Wing ("15 Wing") was a Fleet Air Arm fighter formation of the Royal Navy formed at RNAS Stretton on 8 November 1943. It initially comprised 1830, 1831 and 1833 Naval Air Squadrons, equipped with Vought Corsair fighter-bombers and was formed for service with HMS Illustrious. Lieutenant Commander J.W. Sleigh was appointed its first commander, succeeded by Lieutenant Commander(A) Richard John Cork in December 1943.

After 1831 Squadron was disbanded on 10 December 1943, its personnel and equipment were divided between 1830 and 1833 Squadrons. The Wing subsequently operated with those two squadrons for the remainder of its existence.

== Formation and organisation ==
The Wing was formed at RNAS Stretton, Cheshire, on 8 November 1943 from 1830, 1831 and 1833 Naval Air Squadrons. It was intended for service aboard the name ship of her class HMS Illustrious, and Lieutenant Commander J.W. Sleigh, DSC, RN, was appointed Wing leader. Lieutenant Commander(A) R.J. Cork, DSO, DSC, RN, succeeded Sleigh on 2 December 1943.

The Wing was reduced to two squadrons in December. 1831 Squadron was disbanded on 10 December, with its equipment and aircrew divided between 1830 and 1833 Squadrons, each of which subsequently operated with 14 Vought Corsair aircraft.

1830 Squadron joined HMS Illustrious on 9 December 1943, while 1833 Squadron moved to RNAS Machrihanish, Argyll and Bute, on 9 December and subsequently joined HMS Illustrious on 22 December. 1830 Squadron flew ashore to RNAS Machrihanish on 20 December and re-embarked on 23 December with replacement aircraft and aircrew.

== Eastern Fleet ==
=== Passage and initial operations ===
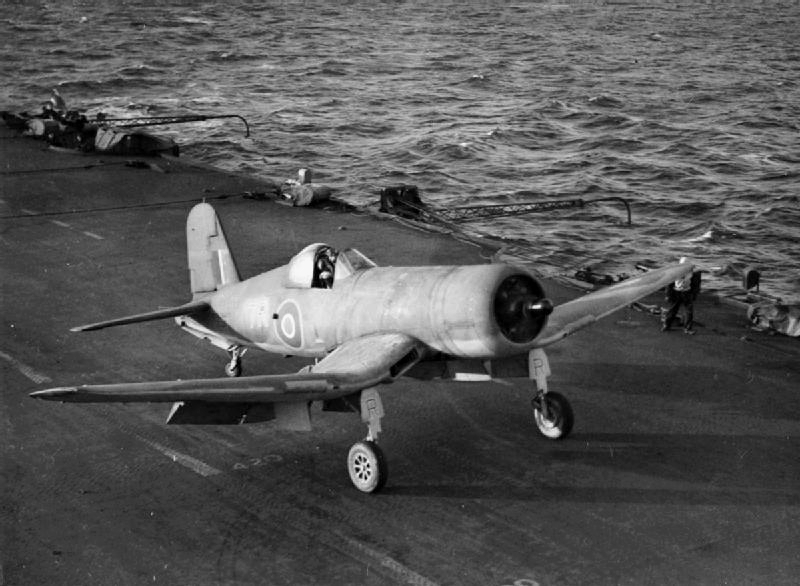
Vought Corsair landing on HMS Illustrious

HMS Illustrious sailed for the Eastern Fleet at the end of December 1943. On arrival at Trincomalee, Ceylon, on 28 January 1944, the Vought Corsairs of 15 Wing flew ashore to the RN Air Section China Bay at RAF China Bay, Ceylon. The Wing conducted flying training and exercises from China Bay before re-embarking for carrier operations in February 1944. It subsequently alternated between shore-based training and carrier operations during the Eastern Fleet deployment.

On 14 April 1944, while the Wing was ashore at RAF China Bay, the Wing Leader, Cork, was killed when his Vought Corsair struck another 15 Wing aircraft being taxied for take-off. Sub-Lieutenant J.M. Anderson of 1830 Squadron was also killed. Lieutenant Commander(A) A.M. Tritton, the commanding officer of 1830 Squadron, became Wing Leader, and 15 Wing rejoined HMS Illustrious on 16 April in preparation for Operation Cockpit.

=== Operation Cockpit ===
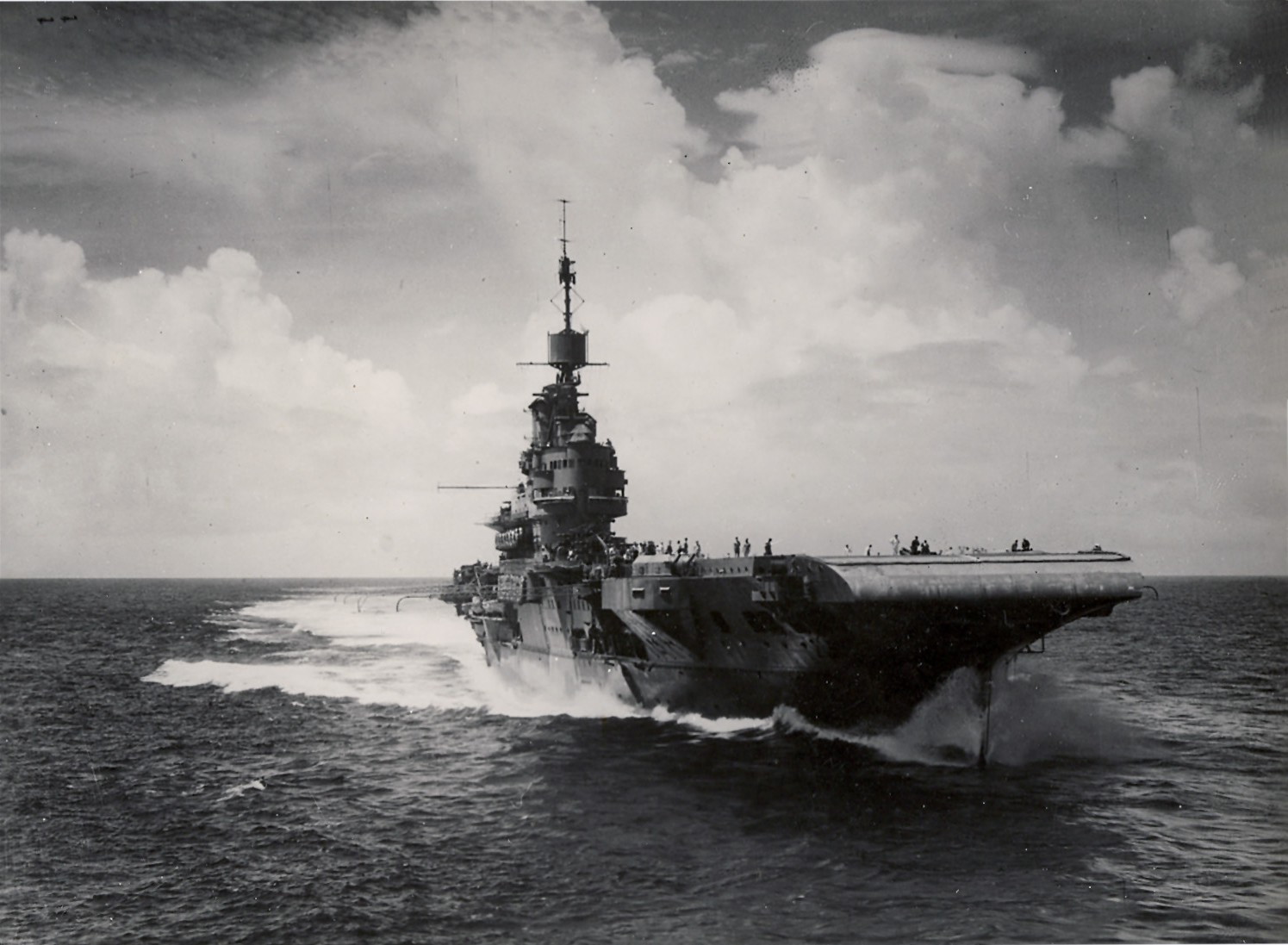
HMS Illustrious in the Indian Ocean while operating with the U.S. Navy's USS Saratoga

Operation Cockpit was conducted from 16 to 19 April 1944 against Japanese installations at Sabang on the island of Pulau Weh, Sumatra. HMS Illustrious operated with the Eastern Fleet force alongside the United States Navy's aircraft carrier USS Saratoga. Vought Corsairs of 15 Wing formed part of the British fighter and strike force employed during the operation.

During the operation, three 15 Wing Vought Corsairs were damaged, all from 1833 Squadron. One was hit by enemy fire and two suffered deck-landing accidents on return from the strike.

=== Operation Transom ===
In May 1944, the Eastern Fleet conducted Operation Transom, an air strike against Japanese facilities at Soerabaja, Java, by aircraft from HMS Illustrious and USS Saratoga. The operation formed part of the wider Allied carrier offensive in the Indian Ocean.

The Admiralty's May 1944 war diary recorded that 85 aircraft took part in the attack and that the Japanese were taken by surprise. The attack damaged installations and shipping at Soerabaja, while 21 Japanese aircraft were recorded as destroyed.

=== Operation Pedal ===
Vought Corsair approaching HMS Illustrious in the Indian Ocean

During Operation Pedal in June 1944, 15 Wing Vought Corsairs provided fighter cover and escort for the Eastern Fleet's Fairey Barracuda strike force. The operation was directed against Japanese targets in the Andaman Islands area, with aircraft from HMS Illustrious forming part of the attacking force.

During the operation, a Vought Corsair of 1833 Squadron was hit by shellfire in the tail but returned safely to the carrier.

=== Operation Crimson ===
Operation Crimson was conducted in July 1944 against Japanese installations at Sabang. Aircraft from HMS Illustrious again took part in the carrier strike, with 15 Wing Vought Corsairs providing fighter and attack support.

Combat claims made by 15 Wing pilots during the operation included several Japanese aircraft claimed destroyed in aerial combat. These were wartime claims rather than independently verified Japanese losses.

== Preparation for the British Pacific Fleet ==
Following the Eastern Fleet operations, HMS Illustrious was released for a refit in South Africa. On 11 August 1944 the aircraft of 15 Wing were moved ashore to RNAS Wingfield, Cape Town, while the aircraft carrier underwent refit. During this period 1838 Squadron, which had been operating from the escort carrier HMS Atheling, was disbanded on 13 September and four of its aircraft and eight pilots were absorbed into 1830 and 1833 Squadrons. The two Vought Corsair squadrons were consequently enlarged to 18 aircraft each.

HMS Illustrious sailed from Cape Town, South Africa, on 13 October and reached Trincomalee, Ceylon, on 1 November. On 2 November, 1830 Squadron moved to RNAS Colombo Racecourse, Colombo, Ceylon, and 1833 Squadron to RAF Koggala, Galle, Ceylon, for training. The two squadrons practised close escort, ground attack and fighter-bomber techniques before returning to carrier operations.

== British Pacific Fleet ==
=== Operation Robson ===
In December 1944, 15 Wing formed part of the air group of HMS Illustrious during Operation Robson, the first of the British Pacific Fleet's four operations collectively known as Operation Outflank. The objective was an air strike against Japanese oil installations at Pangkalan Brandan on the north-west coast of Sumatra. HMS Illustrious operated with 854 Naval Air Squadron, operating Grumman Avengers and 1830 and 1833 Naval Air Squadrons with their Vought Corsairs.

During the operation, HMS Illustrious launched Vought Corsairs from 15 Wing alongside its Grumman Avengers. Four Vought Corsairs were fitted with 500 pounds (230 kg) bombs for the strike, while 12 more provided fighter cover.

Following Operation Robson, HMS Illustrious remained at Trincomalee, Ceylon, for the next stage of the British Pacific Fleet's operations. Each of the two 15 Wing squadrons subsequently supplied a seven-aircraft detachment to RNAS Trincomalee, Ceylon, while the aircraft carrier remained in harbour; the 1830 NAS detachment returned to the aircraft carrier on 12 January 1945 and the 1833 NAS detachment on 16 January.

=== Operation Meridian ===
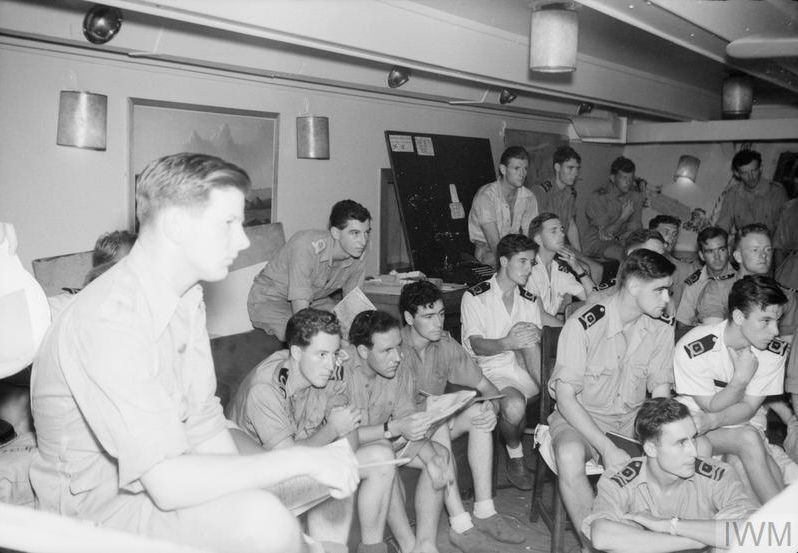
Pilots of 15th Naval Fighter Wing on board HMS Illustrious being briefed or the operation at Palembang

During Operation Meridian in January 1945, the British Pacific Fleet attacked Japanese oil facilities at Palembang, Sumatra. HMS Illustrious operated with 1830 and 1833 Squadrons as part of the British Pacific Fleet carrier force.

On 24 January, eight Vought Corsairs from 1833 Squadron operated as stern cover during the attack on the Pladjoe refinery. During the second phase of Operation Meridian on 29 January, 12 Vought Corsairs from 1830 Squadron flew as part of the fighter cover. Three 1830 Squadron aircraft were lost during the operation, although their pilots were recovered safely. Three Japanese Nakajima Ki-44 Shōki fighters were claimed destroyed by 15 Wing pilots, one by Sub-Lieutenant Churchill of 1833 Squadron and two by pilots of 1830 Squadron.

Following the Meridian operations, 1830 and 1833 Squadrons were flown ashore to RNAS Nowra (HMS Nabbington), New South Wales, Australia, on 9 February 1945 while HMS Illustrious underwent further repairs at Sydney. The squadrons remained ashore while replacement aircraft and aircrew were received and re-embarked on 7 March when the carrier sailed to rejoin the fleet at Manus Island, Papua New Guinea.

=== Operation Iceberg ===
Vought Corsairs of 1830 and 1833 Naval Air Squadrons in the hangar deck of HMS Illustrious

Operation Iceberg was the Allied operation for the invasion of Okinawa Island. During its first phase, from 26 March to 21 April 1945, the British Pacific Fleet operated as Task Force 57 under the operational control of the United States Fifth Fleet. HMS Illustrious operated with 1830 and 1833 Squadrons as part of its fighter force.

On 7 April, two pilots of 1833 Squadron were killed in Vought Corsair accidents. During the subsequent Iceberg operations, aircraft from both 1830 and 1833 Squadrons continued to operate from HMS Illustrious until the carrier was relieved by sister ship HMS Formidable in April.

After reaching Leyte in the Philippines, HMS Illustrious underwent an underwater examination which found more serious hull damage than had initially been apparent, including a depressed area and cracked plates and frames. Her maximum speed had fallen to 19 knots (35 km/h; 22 mph)s and she was withdrawn for repair, eventually proceeding to Australia.

== Return to the United Kingdom and disbandment ==
On 14 May 1945, after HMS Illustrious reached Sydney, the aircraft of 1830 and 1833 Squadrons were flown ashore to RNAS Bankstown (HMS Nabberley), loacted at RAAF Bankstown, Sydney. The Vought Corsairs were withdrawn from the squadrons and their aircrew re-joined HMS Illustrious for the return passage to the United Kingdom.

HMS Illustrious arrived at Rosyth, Fife, Scotland, on 27 July 1945. The 15th Naval Fighter Wing and its two constituent squadrons were disbanded on 28 July.

== Squadrons ==
15th Naval Fighter Wing consisted of two Fleet Air Arm fighter squadrons during its existence:

- 1830 Naval Air Squadron (1943 - 1945)
- 1831 Naval Air Squadron (1943)
- 1833 Naval Air Squadron (1943 - 1945)

== Naval air stations and carrier deployments ==
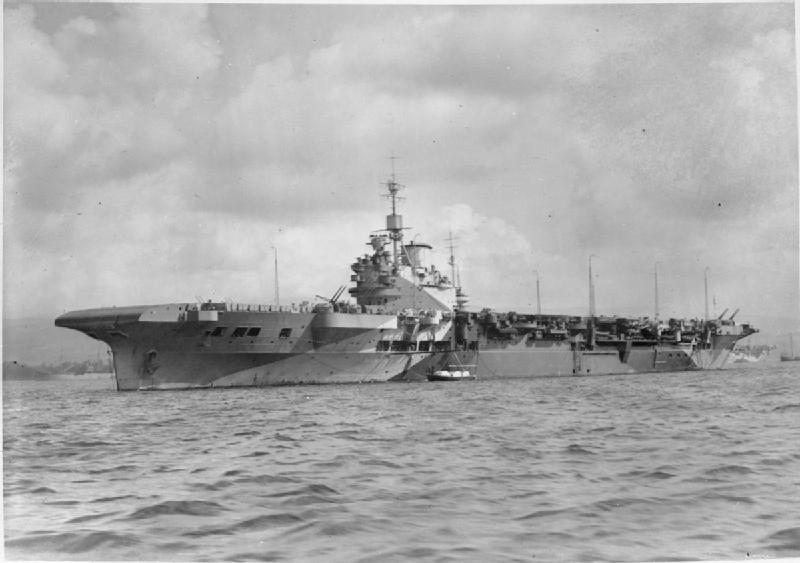
HMS Illustrious

The Wing operated from a series of Royal Naval Air Stations and carriers during its service with the Eastern Fleet and British Pacific Fleet. The wing's principal carrier deployment was aboard the lead ship of her class HMS Illustrious

- Royal Naval Air Station Stretton (HMS Blackcap), Cheshire.
  - 1830 Naval Air Squadron (3 November–9 December 1943)
  - 1831 Naval Air Squadron (3 November–10 December 1943)
  - 1833 Naval Air Squadron (3 November–9 December 1943)
- Royal Naval Air Station Machrihanish (HMS Landrail), Argyll and Bute.
  - 1833 Naval Air Squadron (9–20 December 1943)
  - 1830 Naval Air Squadron (20–23 December 1943)
- HMS Illustrious.
  - 1830 Naval Air Squadron joined the carrier on 9 December 1943, flew ashore to RNAS Machrihanish on 20 December and re-embarked on 23 December. 1833 Naval Air Squadron joined on 22 December.
  - Both squadrons operated from HMS Illustrious during the Eastern Fleet deployment, with periods ashore for training and maintenance. They rejoined the carrier on 16 April 1944 for Operation Cockpit.
  - Following HMS Illustrious' refit in South Africa, 1830 and 1833 Naval Air Squadrons rejoined the aircraft carrier at the end of November 1944 and subsequently operated with the British Pacific Fleet.
- RN Air Section China Bay, Ceylon.
  - 1830 and 1833 Naval Air Squadrons flew ashore on 28 January 1944 after HMS Illustrious arrived at Trincomalee, Ceylon,. They subsequently alternated between the air station and the carrier during training and operations in February and March.
- Royal Naval Air Station Wingfield (HMS Malagas), Cape Town, South Africa.
  - 1830 and 1833 Naval Air Squadrons operated from RNAS Wingfield (HMS Malagas) from 11 August 1944 during HMS Illustrious' refit and subsequent work-up for service with the British Pacific Fleet. The squadrons re-embarked after the refit in October.
- Royal Naval Air Station Colombo Racecourse (HMS Berhunda), Colombo, Ceylon.
  - 1830 Naval Air Squadron operated from RNAS Colombo Racecourse from 2 November 1944 during the carrier's passage from Trincomalee.
- Royal Air Force Koggala, Galle, Ceylon.
  - 1833 Naval Air Squadron operated from RAF Koggala from 2 November 1944 during the aircraft carrier's passage from Trincomalee.
- Royal Naval Air Station Trincomalee (HMS Bambara), Ceylon.
  - 1833 Naval Air Squadron operated from RNAS Trincomalee before rejoining HMS Illustrious on 29 November 1944. A detachment subsequently operated from RNAS Trincomalee during December and January.
  - 1830 Naval Air Squadron also supplied a detachment which operated from Trincomalee during December and January.
- RNAS Katukurunda, Ceylon.
  - 1830 Naval Air Squadron returned to RNAS Katukurunda before rejoining HMS Illustrious on 29 November 1944. A detachment subsequently operated from the station during December and January.
- Royal Naval Air Station Nowra (HMS Nabbington), New South Wales, Australia.
  - 1830 and 1833 Naval Air Squadrons operated from RNAS Nowra (HMS Nabbington) from 9 February to 7 March 1945, during a period ashore for replacement aircraft and training before rejoining HMS Illustrious.
- Royal Naval Air Station Bankstown (HMS Nabberley), New South Wales, Australia.
  - 1830 and 1833 Naval Air Squadrons flew their aircraft ashore at RNAS Bankstown (HMS Nabberley) on 14 May 1945 following HMS Illustrious' withdrawal from active operations. The aircraft were subsequently withdrawn and the aircrew re-joined the carrier.
- Rosyth Dockyard, Fife, Scotland.
  - HMS Illustrious arrived at Rosyth, Fife, on 27 July 1945 and 1830 and 1833 Naval Air Squadrons were disbanded on 28 July.

== Aircraft ==
The Wing operated the Vought Corsair throughout its operational existence.

- Vought Corsair Mk I fighter aircraft (1943)
- Vought Corsair Mk II fighter aircraft (1943 - 1945)
- Vought Corsair Mk IV fighter aircraft (1944 - 1945)

== Wing leaders ==
The wing's recorded commanding officer chronology was:

- Lieutenant Commander J.W. Sleigh, DSC, RN, from 8 November
- Lieutenant Commander(A) R.J. Cork, DSO, DSC, RN, from 2 December 1943
- Lieutenant Commander(A) A.M. Tritton, DSC & Two Bars, RNVR, from 15 April 1944
- disbanded – 28 July 1945

J.W. Sleigh commanded the Wing from its formation. R.J. Cork succeeded him on 2 December 1943 but was killed on 14 April 1944 when his Vought Corsair struck another 15 Wing aircraft being taxied for take-off; Sub-Lieutenant J.M. Anderson of 1830 Squadron was also killed. A.M. Tritton subsequently became Wing Leader and remained in command until the Wing was disbanded.

Note: Abbreviation (A) signifies Air Branch of the RN or RNVR.

== See also ==
- Fleet Air Arm
- List of aircraft wings of the Royal Navy
- 1830 Naval Air Squadron
- 1831 Naval Air Squadron
- 1833 Naval Air Squadron
- HMS Illustrious
- Eastern Fleet
- British Pacific Fleet

== Bibliography ==
- Ballance, Theo; Howard, Lee; Sturtivant, Ray (2016). The Squadrons and Units of the Fleet Air Arm. Air-Britain Historians. ISBN 978-0-85130-489-2.
- Hobbs, David (2011). The British Pacific Fleet: The Royal Navy's Most Powerful Strike Force. Seaforth Publishing. ISBN 9781526702838.
- Wragg, David (2019). The Fleet Air Arm Handbook 1939–1945. The History Press. ISBN 978-0-7509-9303-6.
