= 1833 Naval Air Squadron =

Inactive Royal Navy Fleet Air Arm and Reserve Air Squadron

- Squadron badge
- Active: 1943–1945; 1947–1957
- Disbanded: 10 March 1957
- Country: United Kingdom
- Branch: Royal Navy
- Type: Single-seat fighter squadron; Royal Naval Volunteer Reserve air squadron
- Role: Carrier-based fighter squadron
- Part of: Fleet Air Arm
- Home station: See Naval air stations section for full list.
- Mottos: In caelo regimus (Latin for 'We rule the skies')
- Aircraft: See Aircraft flown section for full list.
- Engagements: World War II: Pacific War; Operation Cockpit; Operation Transom; Operation Crimson; Operation Robson; Operation Meridian; Operation Iceberg
- Battle honours: Sabang 1944; East Indies 1944; Palembang 1945; Okinawa 1945

Insignia
- Squadron Badge Description: Blue, over a base barry wavy of four white and blue an eagle volant armed and langued red wings displayed and elevated all gold (1945)
- Identification Markings: 6A+ (Corsair); AGA+ (Corsair December 1944); 129-147 (Corsair March 1945); 151-168 (Seafire); 251-258 (Harvard); 254-255 (Sea Fury T.20); 271-273 (Sea Fury T.20 February 1954); 251-256 (Firefly); 151-162 (Sea Fury FB.11); 160-166 (Attacker); 833-841 (Attacker January 1956)
- Fin Carrier/Shore Codes: Q (Corsair March 1945); BR (Seafire/Harvard/Sea Fury/Firefly); ST (Attacker)

1833 Naval Air Squadron (1833 NAS) was a Fleet Air Arm (FAA) naval air squadron of the United Kingdom’s Royal Navy (RN) between 1943 and 1945 and then a Royal Naval Volunteer Reserve (RNVR) air squadron from 1947 to 1957.

Initially established as a fighter squadron at HMS Saker II, RNAS Quonset Point. In October, the squadron embarked in HMS Trumpeter and arrived in Belfast on 1 November, then moved to HMS Blackcap, RNAS Stretton, on 3. After completing deck landing training with HMS Ravager, the squadron became part of the 15th Naval Fighter Wing and joined HMS Illustrious in December.

They set sail to join the Eastern Fleet, initially using RAF China Bay as a shore station, where they disembarked for the first time in January 1944. The squadron conducted fighter sweeps over the Bay of Bengal, followed by attacks on shore targets and shipping at Sabang in April and at Sourabaya and the Andaman Islands in June, before returning to Sabang in July.

While the carrier underwent repairs in Durban from mid-August to mid-October 1944, the squadron was stationed at HMS Malagas, RNAS Wingfield, Cape Town. They returned to Ceylon in November and supported attacks on oil refineries and ports in Sumatra in December and January 1945, before the carrier joined the British Pacific Fleet. From March to April, they conducted operations against airfields in the Sakishima Gunto, but a near miss from a Kamikaze caused significant damage to HMS Illustrious, leading to her withdrawal in April. After reaching Australia, the squadron left its aircraft behind and its personnel re-embarked to return to the UK, where the squadron was disbanded upon arrival in July 1945.

== First creation ==
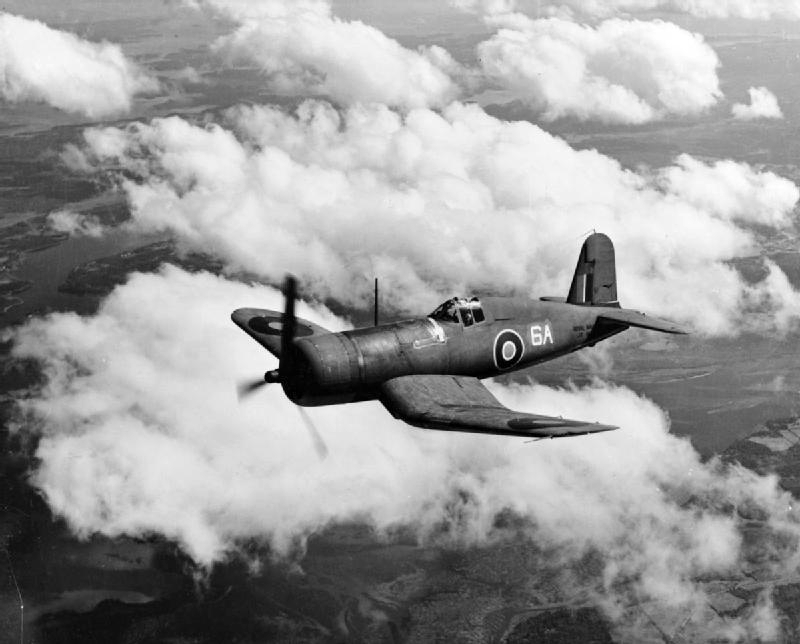
A Corsair of 1833 Squadron on a training exercise over the USA in 1943

The squadron was first formed on 15 July 1943 at the US Naval Air Station at US Naval Air Station Quonset Point, Rhode Island under the command of Lt Cdr (A) H A Monk and with a complement of 10 aircraft. Equipped with the American Chance Vought F4U-1 known as the Corsair I in British service the squadron moved to the US Naval Air Station Brunswick, Maine in August 1943 before shipping back to the United Kingdom in October 1943 on board the escort carrier HMS Trumpeter. While at Brunswick the squadron was re-equipped with an upgraded version of the Corsair, the F4U-1D or Corsair II. The squadron formed part of 15 Naval Fighter Wing under the command of Lt Cdr R J Cork succeeded upon Cork's death in March 1944 by Lt Cdr A M Tritton, the other squadrons being 1830 Squadron and 1831 Squadron. In December 1943 the decision was made to increase the complement of squadrons to 14 aircraft and to achieve this 1831 Squadron was disbanded with its pilots being distributed to the other two squadrons. The wing was assigned to HMS Illustrious and landed on Illustrious on 27 December 1943. On 30 December 1943 Illustrious sailed for the Indian Ocean to join the British Pacific Fleet.

In March 1944 Lt Cdr Monk was posted away and replaced as commanding officer by Lt Cdr N S Hanson RNVR. From May 1944 the squadron took part in several operations including Operation Cockpit, Operation Transom, Operation Crimson, Operation Robson, Operation Outflank, Operation Meridian and Operation Iceberg. In August 1944 the size of the squadron was enlarged again, to 18, with 1838 Squadron from HMS Victorious being disbanded to provide the additional personnel and aircraft.

During Operation Iceberg, Illustrious was damaged by a Japanese Kamikaze attack and the damage sustained resulted in Illustrious being withdrawn from combat operation in May 1945. The personal of the two fighter squadrons were retained on-board, although the aircraft were disembarked in Australia, until the ship returned to the UK in June 1945. The following month both squadrons were disbanded.

The squadron was awarded four battle honours: Okinawa 1945, Palemberg 1945, Sapeng 1944 and East Indies 1944.

== Second creation ==
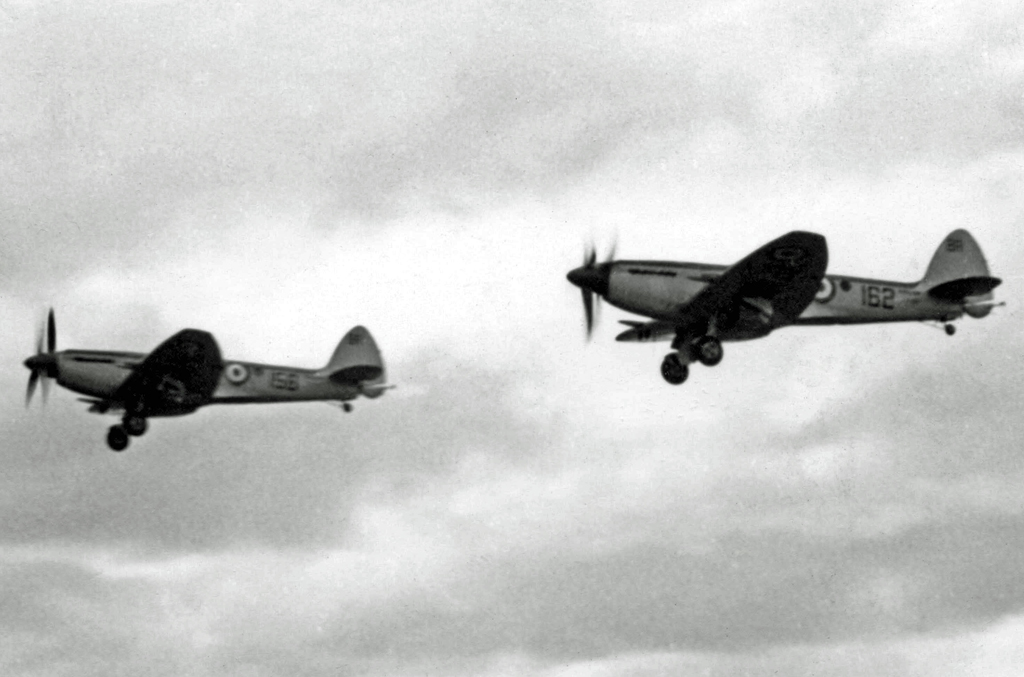
Supermarine Seafires of 1833 Squadron at HMS Gamecock in 1953

In 1947 the squadron was reformed at HMS Gamecock near Bramcote, Warwickshire as one of the first four units of the RNVR Air Branch. Initially equipped with piston-engined aircraft such as the Supermarine Seafire and the Hawker Sea Fury, latterly the squadron was equipped with jet aircraft, the de Havilland Sea Vampire and the Supermarine Attacker. The move to jet aircraft required the squadron to move to RAF Honiley, close to Bramcote, as the facilities at Bramcote were unsuitable for jet aircraft. The squadron was disbanded in March 1957 along with the rest of the RNVR Air Branch.

== Aircraft flown ==
1833 Naval Air Squadron flew different variants of only one aircraft type during the Second World War, but a number of different types and variants while a reserve squadron:

- Vought Corsair Mk I fighter aircraft (July - September 1943)
- Vought Corsair Mk II fighter aircraft (July 1943 - May 1945)
- North American Harvard IIB advanced trainer aircraft (August 1947 - September 1950)
- Supermarine Seafire F Mk.17 fighter aircraft (August 1947 - July 1952)
- North American Harvard III advanced trainer aircraft (January 1949 - January 1954)
- Supermarine Seafire F Mk.15 fighter aircraft (July 1949 - August 1951)
- Avro Anson Mk I multirole training aircraft (December 1949 - July 1954)
- Hawker Sea Fury T.20 two-seat trainer aircraft (October 1950 - October 1955)
- de Havilland Sea Hornet PR.22 photo-reconnaissance aircraft (June 1951 - February 1952)
- Supermarine Seafire F Mk.47 fighter aircraft (June 1952 - February 1954)
- Supermarine Seafire FR Mk.47 fighter/reconnaissance aircraft (June 1952 - February 1954)
- Fairey Firefly T.Mk 2 two-seater operational training aircraft (September - October 1952)
- Fairey Firefly T.Mk 3 anti-submarine warfare training aircraft (November 1952 - July 1954)
- de Havilland Tiger Moth trainer aircraft (July - September 1953)
- Hawker Sea Fury FB.11 fighter-bomber (February 1954 - July 1955)
- Supermarine Attacker FB.2 jet fighter-bomber (October 1955 - January 1957)

== Battle honours ==
The battle honours awarded to 1833 Naval Air Squadron are:

- Sabang 1944
- East Indies 1944
- Palembang 1945
- Okinawa 1945

== Assignments ==
- 15th Naval Fighter Wing (8 November 1943 - 28 July 1945)

== Naval air stations ==
1833 Naval Air Squadron operated mostly from a number of naval air stations of the Royal Navy in the UK and overseas, a Royal Navy fleet carrier and an escort carrier:

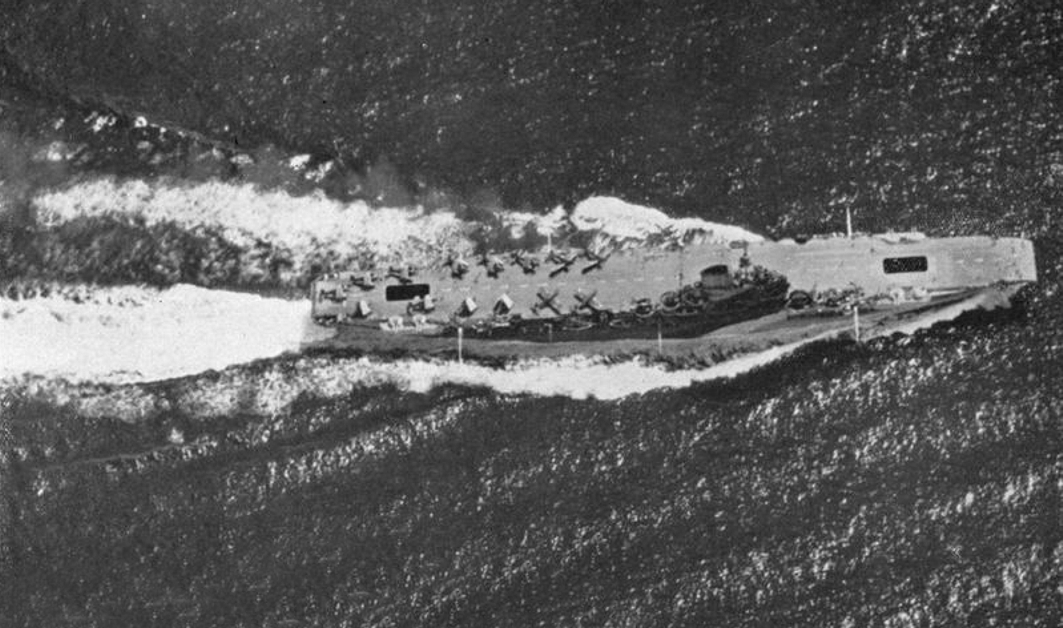
HMS Illustrious underway in the Indian Ocean, between March and May 1944

- Royal Naval Air Station Quonset Point (HMS Saker II), Rhode Island, (15 July - 25 August 1943)
- RN Air Section Brunswick, Maine, (25 August - 7 October 1943)
- HMS Trumpeter (7 October - 1 November 1943)
- Royal Naval Air Station Belfast (HMS Gadwall), County Antrim, (1 - 3 November 1943)
- Royal Naval Air Station Stretton (HMS Blackcap), Cheshire, (3 November - 8 December 1943)
- Royal Naval Air Station Machrihanish (HMS Landrail), Argyll and Bute, (8 - 22 December 1943)
  - HMS Ravager (Detachment Deck Landing Training (DLT) 20–21 December 1943)
- HMS Illustrious (22 December 1943 - 28 January 1944)
  - Royal Naval Air Station Machrihanish (HMS Landrail), Argyll and Bute, (Detachment four aircraft 23–26 December 1943)
- RN Air Section China Bay, Ceylon, (28 January - 10 February 1944)
- HMS Illustrious (10 - 14 February 1944)
- RN Air Section China Bay, Ceylon, (14 - 22 February 1944)
- HMS Illustrious (22 February - 8 March 1944)
- RN Air Section China Bay, Ceylon, (8 - 21 March 1944)
- HMS Illustrious (21 March - 11 August 1944)
  - RN Air Section China Bay, Ceylon, (Detachments 31 March - 5 April 1944 / 27 May - 10 June 1944 / 29 June - 8 July 1944)
- Royal Naval Air Station Wingfield (HMS Malagas), Cape Town, South Africa, (11 August - 13 October 1944)
- HMS Illustrious (13 October - 2 November 1944)
- Royal Air Force Koggala, Ceylon, (2 - 29 November 1944)
- HMS Illustrious (29 November 44
  - Royal Naval Air Station Trincomalee (HMS Bambara), Ceylon (Detachment six aircraft 22 December 1944 - 16 January 1945)
  - Royal Naval Air Station Nowra (HMS Nabbington), New South Wales, (Detachment four aircraft 9 February - 7 March 1945)
- Royal Naval Air Station Bankstown (HMS Nabberley), Sydney, (aircraft) / HMS Illustrious (crews) (14 May - 28 July 1945)
- disbanded UK - (28 July 1945)

== Commanding officers ==
List of commanding officers of 1833 Naval Air Squadron with date of appointment:

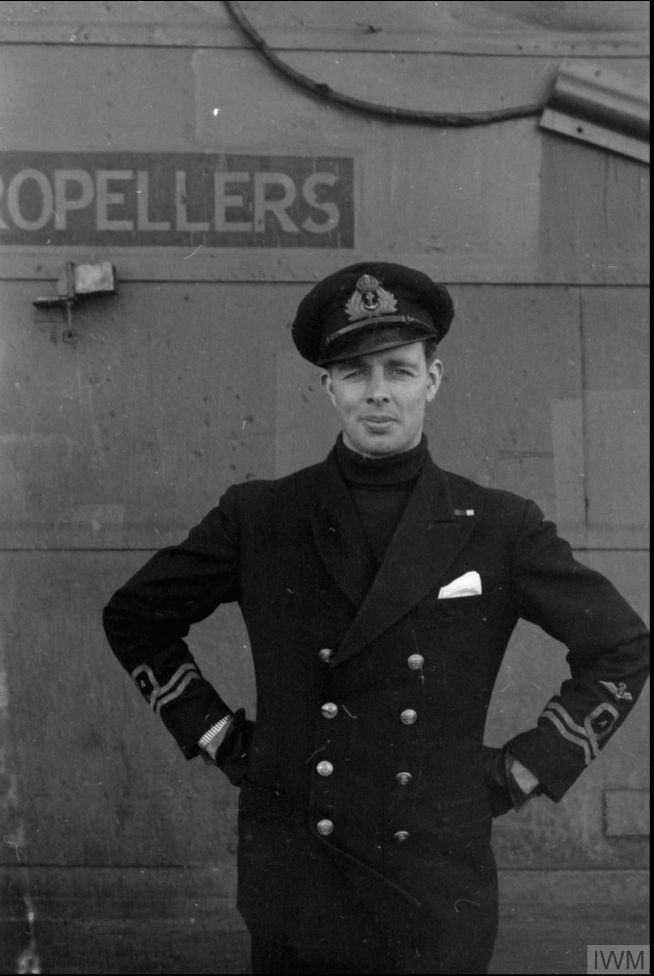
Lieutenant Commander(A) N.S. Hanson, DSC, RNVR

1943 - 1945

- Lieutenant Commander(A) H.A. Monk, DSM & Bar, RN, from 15 July 1943
- Lieutenant Commander(A) N.S. Hanson, DSC, RNVR, from 20 March 1944
- disbanded - 28 July 1945

1947 - 1957

- Lieutenant Commander(A) L.F. Auckland, DSC, RNVR, from 15 August 1947
- Lieutenant Commander(A) R.I.M. Scott, OBE, RNVR, from 16 March 1948
- Lieutenant Commander(A) R.F. Hallam, RNVR, from 1 February 1950
- Lieutenant Commander(A) B.W. Vigrass, RNVR, from 1 April 1952
- Lieutenant Commander(A) D.G. Jenkins, DSC, RNVR, from 28 June 1953
- disbanded - 10 March 1957
