= 1831 Naval Air Squadron =

Inactive Royal Navy Fleet Air Arm and Reserve Air Squadron

- Squadron badge
- Active: 1943; 1944–1946; 1947–1957; 1980–1982
- Disbanded: 1 April 1982
- Country: United Kingdom
- Branch: Royal Navy
- Type: Single-seat fighter squadron; Royal Naval Volunteer Reserve air squadron; Royal Naval Reserve air squadron
- Role: Carrier-based fighter squadron
- Part of: Fleet Air Arm
- Home station: See Naval air stations section for full list.
- Mottos: Nec temere nec timide (Latin for 'Neither rashly nor timidly')
- Aircraft: See Aircraft flown section for full list.

Insignia
- Squadron Badge Description: Per fess blue and barry wavy of four white and blue in base overall a winged greyhound courant gold (1948)
- Identification Markings: 8A+ (Corsair July 1943); 1+ V7 (Corsair November 1944); Y8A (Corsair later); 111-123 (Corsair); 101-113 (Seafire/Sea Fury); 201-205 (Harvard); 201, later 210-213 (Sea Fury T.20); 202-203 (Sea Balliol); 867-868 (Sea Balliol January 1956); 170-176 (Attacker); 810-816 (Attacker January 1956); 260-263 to 818 (Sea Vampire)
- Fin Carrier/Shore Codes: Y (Corsair); JA:ST (Seafire/Sea Fury/Harvard/Sea Fury T.20); ST (Sea Fury T.20/Sea Balliol/Attacker/Sea Vampire)

1831 Naval Air Squadron (1831 NAS) was a Fleet Air Arm (FAA) naval air squadron of the United Kingdom's Royal Navy (RN). It was established in January 1943, at HMS Saker II, RNAS Quonset Point, as a fighter squadron, in the United States. After training at RNAS Quonset Point and Naval Air Station Brunswick, the squadron boarded HMS Trumpeter in June, disembarking in Belfast in November and arriving at HMS Blackcap, RNAS Stretton, two days later. It was disbanded in December after integrating into the 15th Naval Fighter Wing, with its personnel and aircraft redistributed to the other two Naval Air squadrons in the wing, 1830 and 1833. It reformed at Brunswick in November 1944, before joining HMS Pursuer in February 1945. The squadron landed at HMS Gannet, RNAS Eglinton. In May 1945, its strength increased to twenty-one aircraft before it joined the light fleet carrier HMS Glory in November. The carrier sailed to the Far East to become part of the British Pacific Fleet and was home to the 16th Carrier Air Group, disembarking at HMS Ukussa, RNAS Katukurunda, in July. The squadron did not see combat before the war concluded and was disbanded in 1946.

The squadron was reformed a year later, as part of the Royal Navy Volunteer Reserve where in 1955 it became the first jet-equipped squadron of the Royal Navy Volunteer Reserve, before being disbanded in 1957. It was later briefly reformed between 1980–81 to assist in training aircrew.

== Second World War ==
1831 Naval Air Squadron initially formed on 1 July 1943 at NAS Quonset Point in Rhode Island, equipped with Lend-Lease supplied Vought Corsair fighters. It crossed the Atlantic to Britain in October, but was disbanded on 10 December 1943, when it was broken up to re-inforce 1830 and 1833 Naval Air Squadrons. It reformed on 1 November 1944, again as a Corsair-equipped squadron, at another American naval base, this time NAS Brunswick in Maine. The Squadron returned to Britain in February 1945, embarking on the aircraft carrier Glory which sailed to join the British Pacific Fleet in May 1945. By the time Glory reached the Pacific, the Second World War was almost over, and the ship's Naval Air Wing, including 1831 Squadron, saw no combat. The squadron, without its aircraft, returned to Britain and disbanded on arrival on 13 August 1946.

== Naval Reserve ==
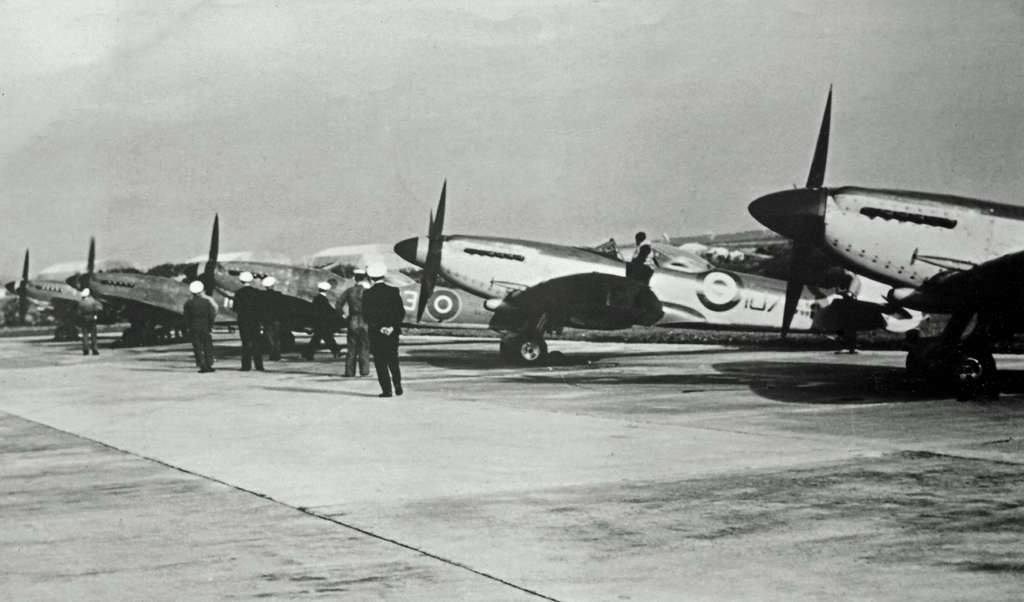
Supermarine Seafire F.17's of 1831 RNVR Squadron Fleet Air Arm at RNAS Stretton in 1950

1831 Squadron reformed at RNAS Stretton in Cheshire on 1 June 1947 as part of the Royal Navy Volunteer Reserve, equipped with Supermarine Seafire fighters and a single North American Harvard trainer. The squadron, which had its strength supplemented by single examples of the Hawker Sea Fury and Fairey Firefly in 1948, carried out a training deployment aboard Illustrious in September 1949 and again in August–September 1950. The Squadron re-equipped with the Sea Fury in August 1951 and in June 1952, became part of the newly established Northern Air Division of the RNVR, being joined by 1841 Squadron, equipped with Fireflies in the anti-submarine role, in July that year. On 15 June 1953, 1831 Squadron took part in the flypast for the Coronation Fleet Review marking the Coronation of Elizabeth II, and in July that year it carried out more deck landing training aboard Illustrious.

In August 1954, the Northern Air Division was deployed to Har Far, Malta for that year's 14-day continuous training period. That month it also replaced its Harvard trainers with Boulton Paul Sea Balliols, which were used both for training and communications duties. From May–June 1955, the Squadron became the first jet-equipped squadron of the Royal Navy Volunteer Reserve, replacing its Sea Furys with seven Supermarine Attacker jet fighters and one de Havilland Vampire T22 trainer, while retaining its Sea Balliols. Later that year, the squadron formed a formation aerobatic team with its Attackers, displaying at five airshows that year. On 9 January 1957, it was announced that flying units of the Royal Auxiliary Air Force and the Royal Navy Volunteer Reserve were to be disbanded, with operational training ending on 10 January. As a result, 1831 Naval Air Squadron disbanded on 10 March 1957.

The Squadron reformed on 3 April 1980 at RNAS Lee-on-Solent with the role of giving continuation training to aircrew in the Royal Navy Reserve. It had no aircraft of its own, borrowing aircraft from other squadrons as required. The Squadron moved to RNAS Yeovilton on 1 April 1981 but soon disbanded.

== Aircraft flown ==
1831 Naval Air Squadron flew different variants of only one aircraft type during the Second World War, but a number of different types and variants while a reserve squadron:

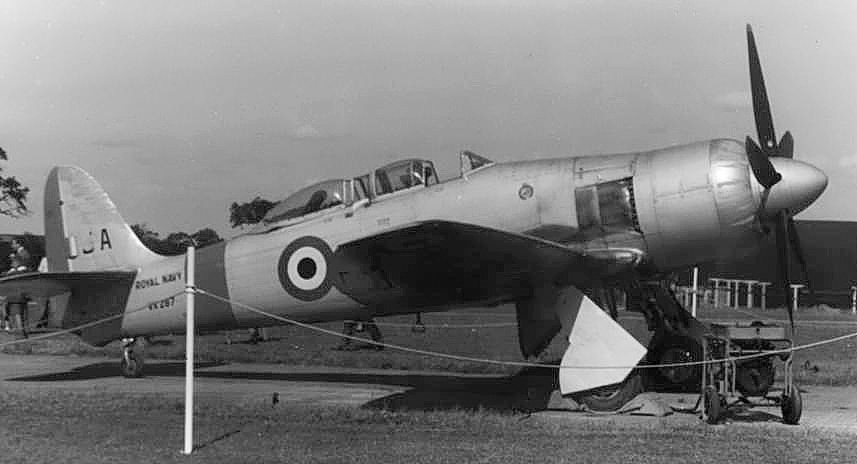
Hawker Sea Fury T.20 trainer VX287 of 1831 RNVR Squadron at RNAS Stretton in 1951

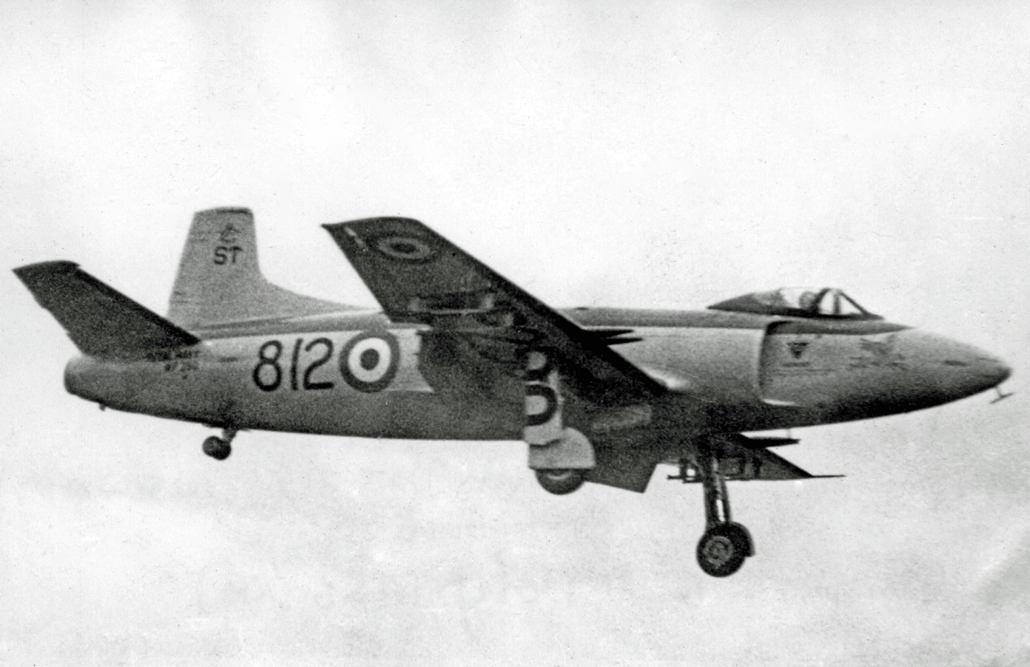
Supermarine Attacker FB.2 WP290 of 1831 RNVR Squadron landing at RNAS Stretton in 1956

- Vought Corsair Mk I fighter aircraft (July - December 1943)
- Vought Corsair Mk IV fighter aircraft (November 1944 - August 1946)
- North American Harvard III advanced trainer aircraft (June 1947 - July 1950)
- Supermarine Seafire F Mk.15 fighter aircraft (June 1947 - August 1951)
- Supermarine Seafire F Mk.17 fighter aircraft (June 1947 - August 1951)
- Fairey Firefly T.Mk 1 twin-cockpit training aircraft (June - December 1948)
- Taylorcraft Auster V liaison and observation aircraft (January 1949 - March 1954)
- North American Harvard IIB advanced trainer aircraft (May 1950 - November 1954)
- Hawker Sea Fury T.20 two-seat trainer aircraft (October 1950 - June 1955)
- Hawker Sea Fury FB.11 fighter-bomber (August 1951 - June 1955)
- Fairey Firefly T.Mk 3 anti-submarine warfare training aircraft (May - August 1952)
- Boulton Paul Sea Balliol T.21 advanced trainer aircraft (October 1954 - January 1957)
- Supermarine Attacker FB.2 jet fighter-bomber (May 1955 - January 1957)
- de Havilland Sea Vampire T.22 jet trainer aircraft (May 1955 - January 1957)

== Assignments ==
1831 Naval Air Squadron was assigned as needed to form part of a number of larger units:

- 15th Naval Fighter Wing (8 November - 10 December 1943)
- Royal Naval Volunteer Reserve Northern Air Division (1 June 1952 - 10 March 1957)

== Naval air stations ==
1831 Naval Air Squadron operated mostly from a number of naval air stations of the Royal Navy in the UK and overseas, a Royal Navy fleet carrier and an escort carrier:

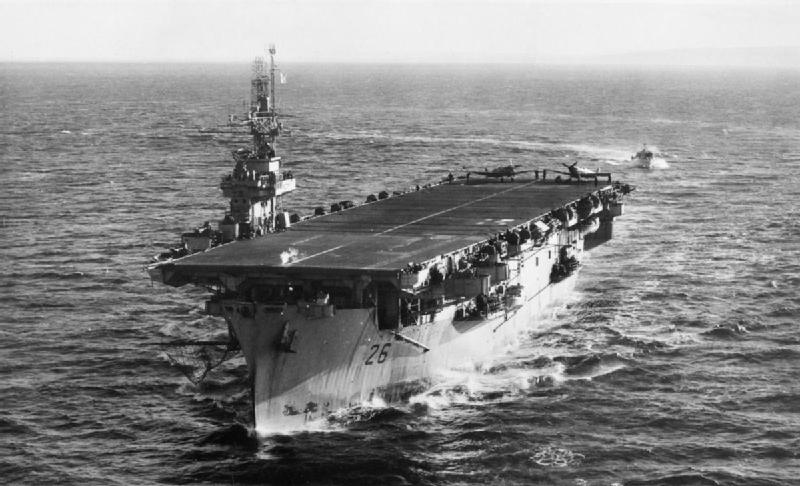
HMS Slinger

1943

- Royal Naval Air Station Quonset Point (HMS Saker II), Rhode Island, (1 July - 23 August 1943)
- RN Air Section Brunswick, Maine, (23 August - 4 October 1943)
- RN Air Section Norfolk, Virginia, (4 - 6 October 1943)
- HMS Slinger (6 October - 1 November 1943)
- Royal Naval Air Station Belfast (HMS Gadwall), County Antrim, (1 - 3 November 1943)
- Royal Naval Air Station Stretton (HMS Blackcap), Cheshire, (3 November - 10 December 1943)
- disbanded - (10 December 1943)

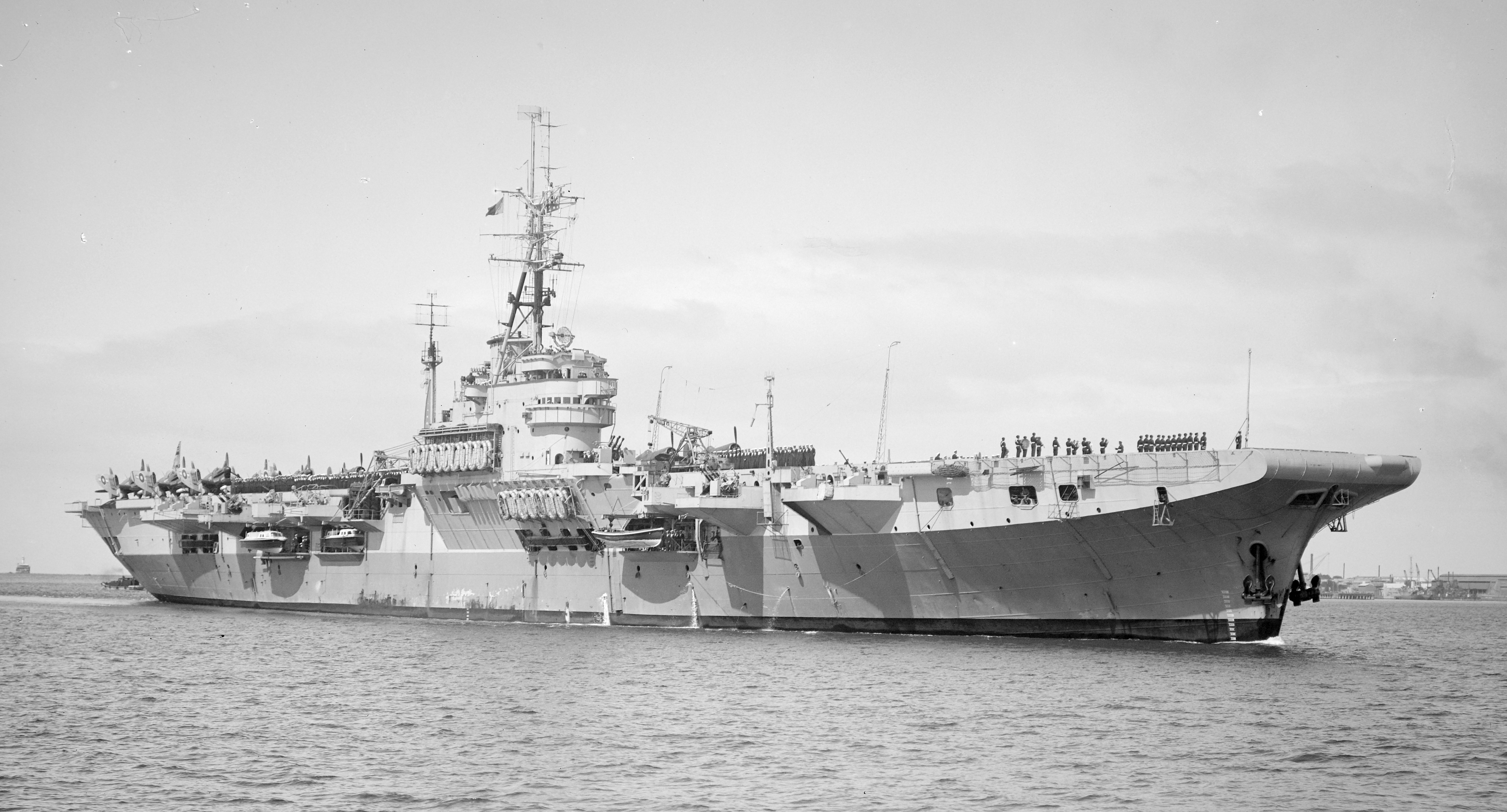
HMS Glory

1944 - 1946

- RN Air Section Brunswick, Maine, (1 November - 20 December 1944)
- RN Air Section Norfolk, Virginia, (20 - 28 December 1944)
- RN Air Section Brunswick, Maine, (28 December 1944 - 31 January 1945)
- RN Air Section Norfolk, Virginia, (transit) (31 January - 1 February 1945)
- HMS Pursuer (1 - 18 February 1945)
- Royal Naval Air Station Eglinton (HMS Gannet), County Londonderry, (18 February - 11 May 1945)
- HMS Glory (11 - 22 May 1945)
- RN Air Section Hal Far, Malta, (22 - 26 May 1945)
- HMS Glory (26 May - 18 June 1945)
- Royal Naval Air Station Dekheila (HMS Grebe), Egypt, (18 June - 2 July 1945)
- HMS Glory (2 - 15 July 1945)
- Royal Naval Air Station Katukurunda (HMS Ukussa), Ceylon, (15 - 27 July 1945)
- HMS Glory (27 July - 16 August 1945)
- Royal Naval Air Station Schofields (HMS Nabthorpe), New South Wales, (16 August - 1 September 1945)
- HMS Glory (1 - 11 September 1945)
  - Jacquinot Bay Airport (Detachment 5 - 30 September 1945)
- Royal Naval Air Station Jervis Bay (HMS Nabswick), Jervis Bay Territory, (11 September - 29 October 1945)
- Royal Naval Air Station Nowra (HMS Nabbington), New South Wales, (29 October 1945 - 19 January 1946)
- HMS Glory (19 January - 15 February 1946)
- RAAF Station Williamtown, New South Wales, (15 February - 10 June 1946)
- HMS Glory (10 June - 15 July 1946)
- Royal Naval Air Station Trincomalee (HMS Bambara), Ceylon, (15 - 16 July 1946)
- HMS Vengeance (crews) (16 July - 13 August 1946)
- disbanded - (13 August 1946)

1947 - 1957

- Royal Naval Air Station Stretton (HMS Blackcap), Cheshire, (1 June 1947 - 10 March 1957)
  - Valkenburg Naval Air Base, Katwijk, Netherlands, (Detachment 12 - 13 September 1953, 12 - 13 April 1956)
  Annual training
  - Royal Naval Air Station Culdrose (HMS Seahawk), Cornwall, (4 - 17 September 1948)
  - HMS Illustrious (21 September - 1 October 1949, 29 August - 9 September 1950)
  - Royal Naval Air Station St Merryn (HMS Vulture), Cornwall, (7 - 20 July 1951)
  - Royal Naval Air Station Hal Far (HMS Falcon), Malta, (19 - 30 May 1952)
  - Royal Naval Air Station St Merryn (HMS Vulture), Cornwall, (Deck Landing Training (DLT) HMS Illustrious 22 June - 4 July 1953)
  - Royal Naval Air Station Hal Far (HMS Falcon), Malta, (20 August - 3 September 1954)
  - Royal Naval Air Station Brawdy (HMS Goldcrest), Pembrokeshire, (28 July - 10 August 1956)
- disbanded - (10 March 1957)

1980 - 1982

- Royal Naval Air Station Lee-on-Solent (HMS Daedalus), Hampshire, (3 April 1980 - 1 April 1981)
- Royal Naval Air Station Yeovilton (HMS Heron), Somerset, (1 April 1981 - 1 April 1982)
- concept lapsed - (1 April 1982)

== Commanding officers ==
List of commanding officers of 1831 Naval Air Squadron with date of appointment:

1943

- Lieutenant Commander H.P. Allingham, RNR, from 1 July 1943
- disbanded - 10 December 1943

1944 - 1946

- Lieutenant Commander(A) R.W.M. Walsh, RN, from 1 November 1944
- Lieutenant(A) R.W.H. Boyns, RNVR, from 2 August 1945
- Lieutenant Commander(A) R.T. Leggott, MBE, RN, from 28 March 1946
- disbanded - 12 August 1946

Note: Abbreviation (A) signifies Air Branch of the RN or RNVR.
