= HMS Tactician (P314) =

Submarine of the Royal Navy

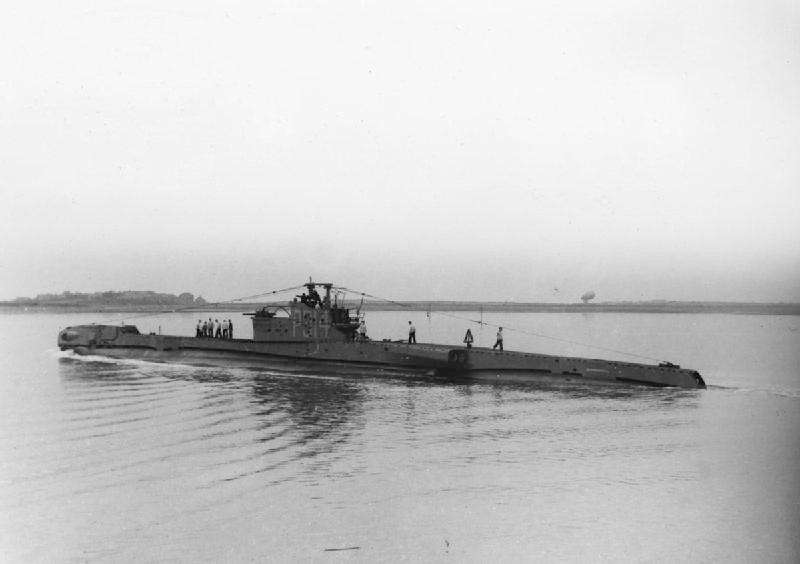

History

United Kingdom
- Name: Tactician
- Builder: Vickers Armstrong, Barrow
- Laid down: 13 November 1941
- Launched: 29 July 1942
- Commissioned: 29 November 1942
- Identification: Pennant number P314
- Fate: Scrapped December 1963
- Badge

General characteristics
- Class & type: T-class submarine
- Displacement: 1,290 long tons (1,310 t) surfaced; 1,560 long tons (1,590 t) submerged
- Length: 276 ft 6 in (84.28 m)
- Beam: 25 ft 6 in (7.77 m)
- Draught: 12 ft 9 in (3.89 m) forward; 14 ft 7 in (4.45 m) aft
- Propulsion: Two shafts; Twin diesel engines 2,500 hp (1,900 kW) each; Twin electric motors 1,450 hp (1,080 kW) each
- Speed: 15.5 knots (28.7 km/h; 17.8 mph) surfaced; 9 knots (17 km/h; 10 mph) submerged
- Range: 4,500 nmi (8,300 km; 5,200 mi) at 11 knots (20 km/h; 13 mph) surfaced
- Test depth: 300 ft (91 m) max
- Complement: 61
- Armament: 6 internal forward-facing 21-inch (533 mm) torpedo tubes; 2 external forward-facing torpedo tubes; 2 external amidships rear-facing torpedo tubes; 1 external rear-facing torpedo tubes; 6 reload torpedoes; 1 × 4-inch (102 mm) deck gun; 3 × anti-aircraft machine guns

HMS Tactician was a British submarine of the third group of the T class. She was built as P314 by Vickers-Armstrongs, Barrow, and launched on 29 July 1942.

== Service ==
Tactician served in the Mediterranean Sea and the Far East during her wartime career. Whilst operating against the Italians, she sank the Italian auxiliary patrol vessel V17/Pia and the Italian sailing vessel Bice. She also torpedoed the Italian merchant vessel Rosandra off the coast of Albania; sinking her the following day.

On being transferred to the Pacific, commanded by Lt. Cdr. Anthony Collett, DSC, she continued to harass enemy shipping, sinking a small Japanese vessel and two Siamese sailing vessels before the end of the war. She took part in Operation Cockpit, where she rescued a downed US airman under fire.

A newsreel dated 1952 shows Tactician taking part in a military exercise in the Sea of Japan. In it, the submarine is seen diving.

Tactician survived the war and continued in service with the navy, finally being scrapped at Newport on 6 December 1963.

== See also ==
- List of submarines of the Royal Navy
