= Operation Cockpit =

1944 Allied raid on the Japanese-held island of Sabang

- Part of the South-East Asian theatre of World War II
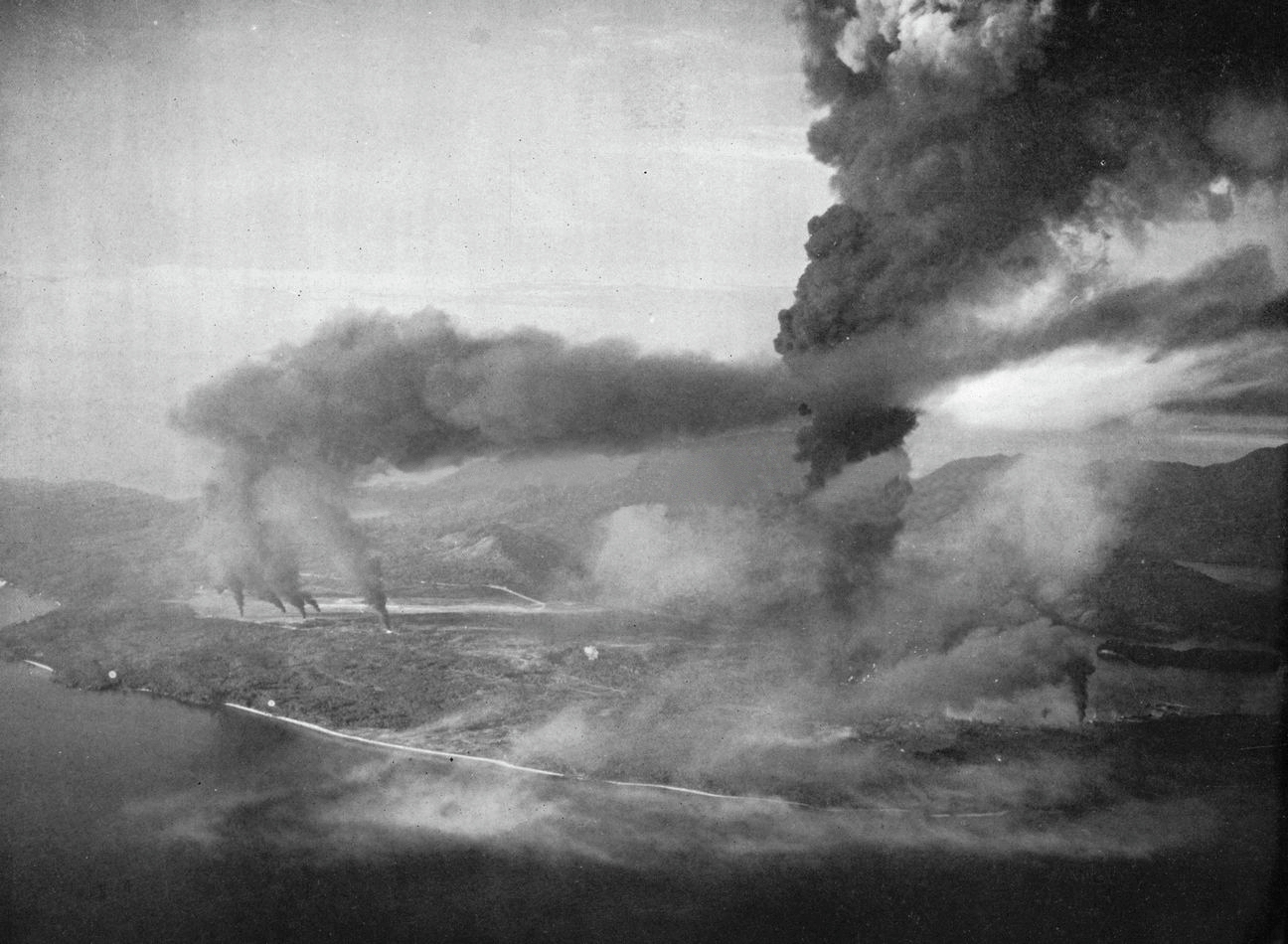
- Sabang under attack on 19 April 1944
Date	19 April 1944
Location	Sabang, Dutch East Indies 5°53′39″N 95°19′9″E
Result	Inconclusive

Belligerents
United Kingdom; United States; Australia; New Zealand; Netherlands; Free France	Japan

Commanders and leaders
(United Kingdom) James Somerville	(Empire of Japan) Hirose Sueto

Strength
2 aircraft carriers 3 battleships 1 battlecruiser 6 cruisers 15 destroyers 1 submarine	Anti-aircraft batteries 3 torpedo bombers

Casualties and losses
1 aircraft destroyed	1 merchant vessel sunk 1 merchant vessel beached Up to 24 aircraft destroyed on the ground 3 aircraft shot down

Operation Cockpit was an Allied attack against the Japanese-held island of Sabang on 19 April 1944. It was conducted by aircraft flying from British and American aircraft carriers and targeted Japanese shipping and airfields. A small number of Japanese ships and aircraft were destroyed, and one American aircraft was lost. While the attack was successful tactically, it failed to divert Japanese forces from other areas as had been hoped.

The attack on Sabang was the first of several carrier raids conducted by the British-led Eastern Fleet during 1944 and 1945. It sought to prevent the Japanese from transferring forces in the area to contest a planned American landing in New Guinea. Sabang's defenders were taken by surprise, and the attackers encountered little opposition. The Japanese did not react to the operation as the Eastern Fleet was not seen as a serious threat and their forces in the area were being preserved for use against an expected major American offensive in the Central Pacific. Nevertheless, the Allies were pleased with the results of the attack.

== Background ==
From mid-1942 until early 1944 the Allies did not undertake any offensive naval operations in the Indian Ocean. Their main naval force there, the British-led Eastern Fleet which was headed by Admiral James Somerville, was weak. From January 1943 the fleet did not include any aircraft carriers and its three elderly battleships were transferred later in the year. The remaining force was capable only of protecting Allied shipping. Fortunately for the Allies, the Japanese did not attempt any large-scale operations in the Indian Ocean. This allowed the Eastern Fleet to focus on countering German and Japanese submarines and using its own submarines to raid Japanese shipping.

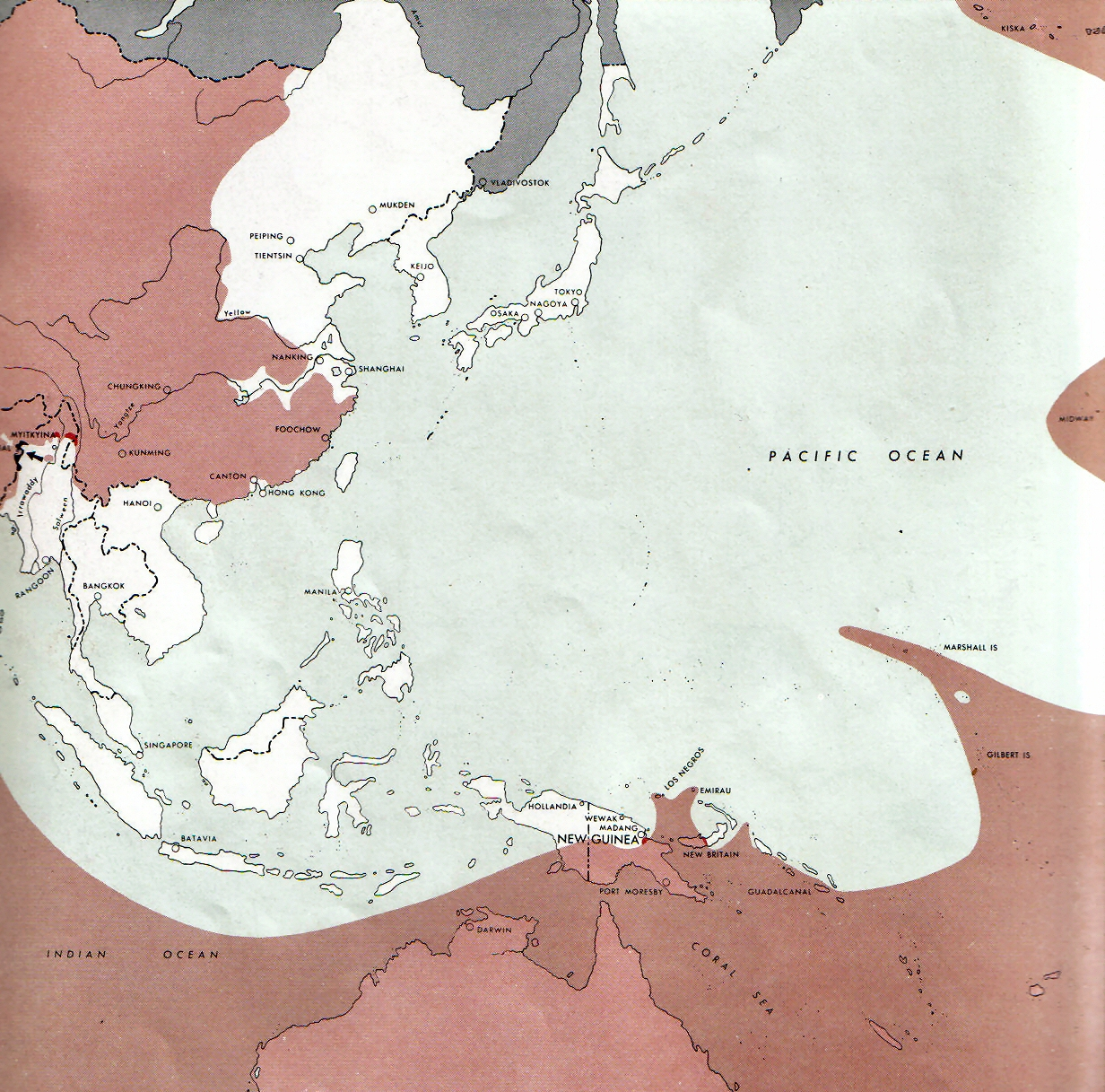
The strategic situation in the Pacific in mid-April 1944. The red shaded area was controlled by the Allies and the remainder was controlled by Japan.

At the Cairo Conference held during November 1943, the Allied leadership agreed that "the main effort against Japan should be made in the Pacific", and that the Indian Ocean would be a subsidiary theatre. It was also decided that any offensive operations, including carrier raids, in the theatre would have the goals of "maintaining pressure on the enemy, forcing dispersion of his forces, and attaining the maximum attrition of his air and naval forces and shipping".

In January 1944 the Admiralty, the British Government institution responsible for administering the Royal Navy, decided to substantially reinforce the Eastern Fleet. This had been made possible by the surrender of the Italian Navy in 1943, which removed one of the Royal Navy's main opponents and gave the Allies control over the Mediterranean Sea. The reinforcements which were scheduled to arrive over the next four months comprised 146 warships, and included three battleships, two aircraft carriers, fourteen cruisers and large numbers of destroyers and other escort vessels. The first substantial group of reinforcements reached the Eastern Fleet's base at Ceylon on 27 January; these included the aircraft carrier HMS Illustrious, battleships HMS Queen Elizabeth and Valiant and battlecruiser HMS Renown. Shortages of destroyers hindered the fleet's ability to conduct offensive operations until April, however, as priority needed to be given to escorting convoys.

Also in early 1944, the Japanese military transferred its main naval striking force, the Combined Fleet, to Singapore. This was done to evacuate the fleet's bases in the central Pacific, which were now vulnerable to American attacks, and concentrate it at a location with good naval repair facilities and ready access to fuel. The Japanese did not intend any large-scale attacks into the Indian Ocean. The Allies were concerned about the Combined Fleet's intentions, and Somerville believed that his force would be unable to counter the fleet if it entered the Indian Ocean. As a result, additional Allied air units were dispatched to protect Ceylon. The United States Navy also agreed to temporarily transfer the aircraft carrier USS Saratoga and three destroyers from the Pacific to augment the Eastern Fleet; this was done so that the British did not have to free up reinforcements for the Eastern Fleet by cancelling the planned Operation Tungsten carrier raid on the German battleship Tirpitz in Norway.

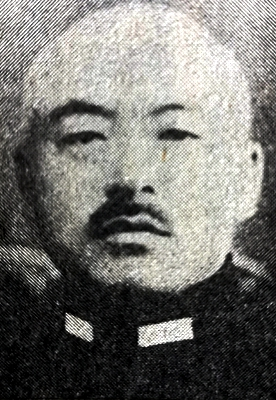
Rear Admiral Hirose Sueto

Sabang island lies off the northern end of Sumatra. The island was used as a base by the Imperial Japanese Navy (IJN) during the Japanese occupation of the Dutch East Indies. Its location at the northern entrance of the Strait of Malacca made it strategically important. The IJN's 9th Base Force was the main unit stationed at Sabang, and was commanded by Rear Admiral Hirose Sueto from February 1944. The British believed that the island's garrison comprised 9,000 personnel.

== Prelude ==
In late March the main body of the Eastern Fleet, including Illustrious, Renown, Queen Elizabeth and Valiant, sortied into the Indian Ocean. The main goals of what was designated Operation Diplomat were to search for Japanese ships following an unsuccessful cruiser raid and link up with Saratoga. The operation also provided an opportunity to practice operating the ships together and refuelling at sea ahead of the fleet commencing offensive operations. The British ships departed Ceylon on 21 March, refuelled from tankers between 24 and 26 March and rendezvoused with Saratoga on 27 March. The carriers' aircraft exercised together during the return voyage, and the fleet arrived back at Ceylon on 2 April.

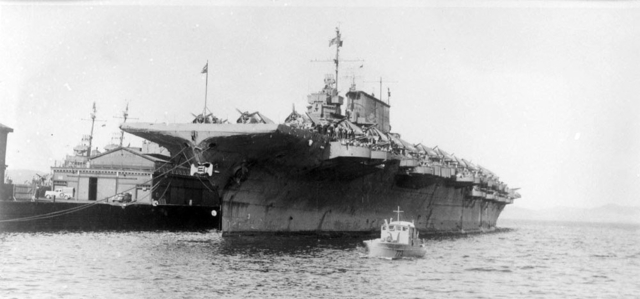
USS Saratoga at Hobart in March 1944 during her voyage to the Indian Ocean

The decision to attack Sabang was made in response to a request from the head of the US Navy, Admiral Ernest King. King asked that the Eastern Fleet undertake a raid in mid-April to prevent the Japanese from dispatching naval aircraft stationed in southern Malaya to attack the large Allied naval forces allocated to an amphibious landing at Hollandia in New Guinea on 22 April. At a meeting on 12 April, the Eastern Fleet's senior officers decided to conduct a carrier raid on Sabang. The plans for the operation also included a surface ship bombardment of Sabang, but it was decided to omit this shortly before the fleet departed as it was believed that operating close to the shore would be unduly risky. The raid was considered to be a trial, to test the fleet's procedures ahead of more ambitious operations. During the first two weeks of April, the Eastern Fleet finalised its plans for the attack and rehearsed the operation. This was to be the first aircraft carrier raid attempted by the Eastern Fleet.

The Allies had little intelligence on the Japanese forces at Sabang, with holdings being limited to small numbers of aerial reconnaissance photographs. It was believed that the island was strongly defended, with the Japanese having a radar station and an airfield there. Somerville decided against further reconnaissance flights over the island due to the risk that they would alert the Japanese. Intelligence gained from breaking German and Japanese codes contributed to the planning for Operation Cockpit by allowing the Allies to track the locations of enemy warships and air units in the region. The Far East Combined Bureau also developed a radio deception plan for the operation which proved successful.

Despite the Allied intentions, the Japanese had little interest in engaging the Eastern Fleet. The IJN was aware that the fleet was too weak to pose a significant threat, and were preserving their forces, including the aircraft in southern Malaya, to contest the American advance through the central Pacific. The Combined Fleet was under orders to only engage the Eastern Fleet if it mounted a large scale attack. Land based naval bombers were assigned to counter Allied naval forces in the Indian Ocean.

== Attack ==
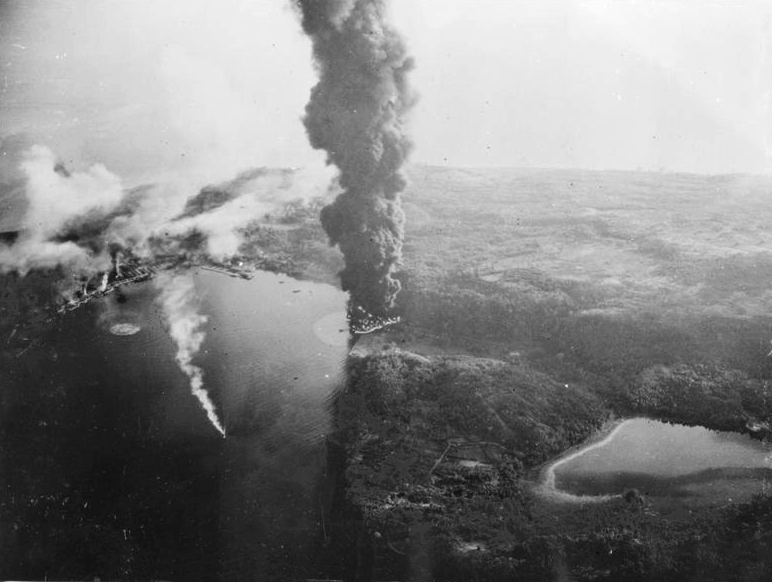
Oil tanks, ships and port installations at Sabang on fire during the attack

The attack force sailed from the Eastern Fleet's main base at Trincomalee on 16 April, and was led personally by Somerville from Queen Elizabeth. It comprised 27 warships from six navies; the historian H.P. Willmott has observed that Operation Cockpit was "perhaps the most cosmopolitan naval operation of the war". The Royal Navy contributed Illustrious, two battleships, one battlecruiser, four cruisers and seven destroyers. The American contingent comprised Saratoga and three destroyers. Other elements of the force included the recently arrived French battleship Richelieu, Dutch cruiser HNLMS Tromp and a Dutch destroyer, the New Zealand cruiser HMNZS Gambia and four Australian destroyers. The Allied ships were organised into two task forces; Task Force 69 was a battleship covering force comprising the three battleships, two cruisers and nine destroyers. Task Force 70 comprised the aircraft carriers, Renown, two cruisers and six destroyers. The submarine HMS Tactician was also stationed near Sabang to rescue any airmen who were forced down during the attack. This was the largest force the Eastern Fleet had been able to send into combat up to that point in the war.

Each carrier had an air group made up of units from their parent navies. Illustrious embarked two squadrons equipped with 14 Vought F4U Corsair fighters each and two squadrons operating a total of 21 Fairey Barracuda torpedo and dive bombers. Saratoga's air group comprised a squadron with 26 Grumman F6F Hellcat fighters, a squadron with 24 Douglas SBD Dauntless dive bombers and a squadron operating 18 Grumman TBF Avenger torpedo bombers, as well as a single Hellcat allocated to the Air Group Leader. The commander of Saratoga's air group, Commander Joseph C. Clifton, led both carriers' air wings during Operation Cockpit.

After an uneventful journey, and without being detected by the Japanese, the Allied force arrived at the carriers' flying off point 100 miles (160 km) south-west of Sabang in the early hours of 19 April. The strike force began to be launched at 5:30 am; Illustrious dispatched 17 Barracudas and 13 Corsairs and Saratoga 24 Hellcats, 18 Dauntlesses and 11 Avengers. Of the Hellcats, 16 were to escort the strike force and 8 attack Lho Nga airfield in northern Sumatra. Clifton led the strike force while it was in the air. A combat air patrol comprising four Corsairs and eight Hellcats was maintained over the fleet.

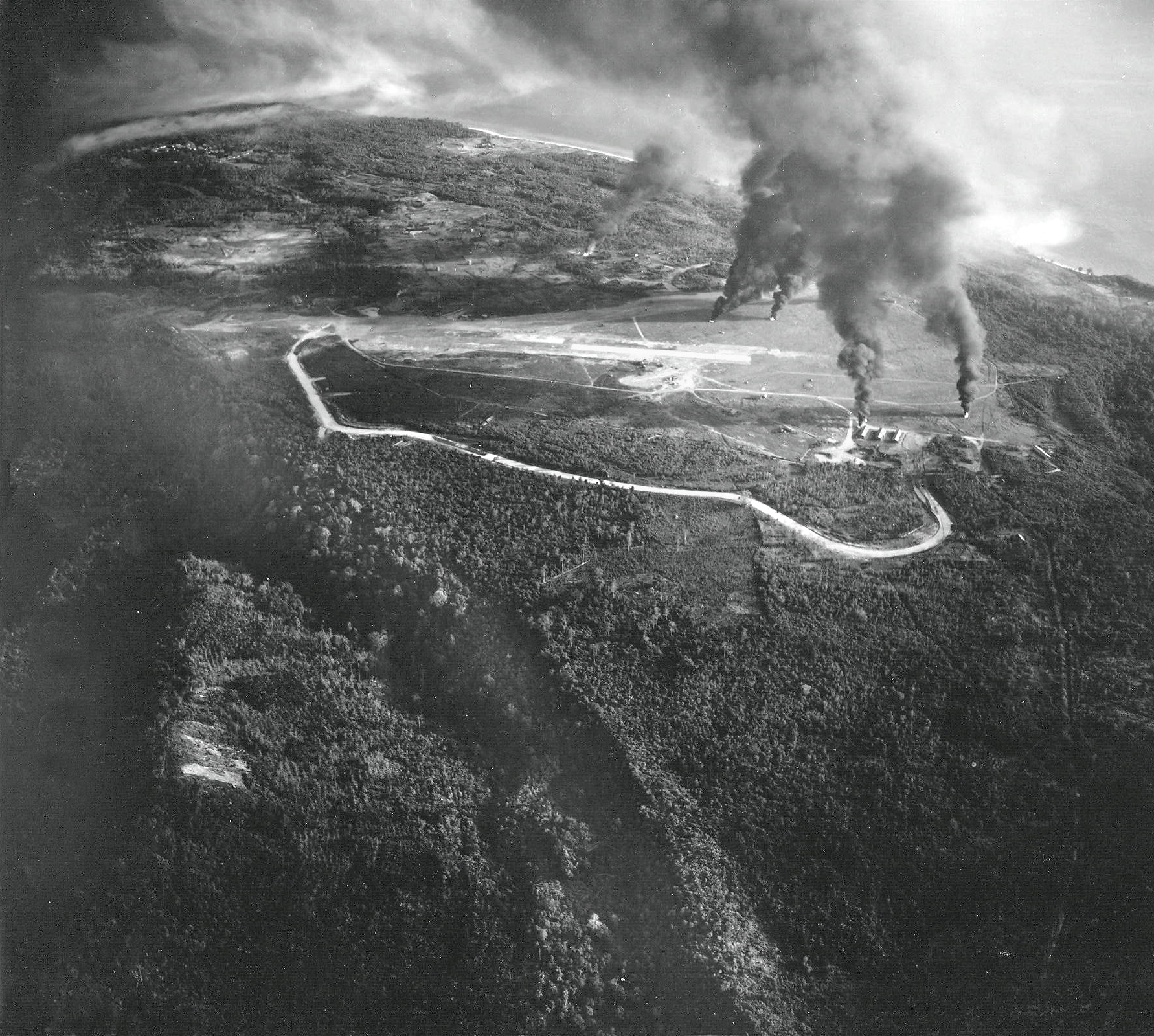
Fires burning at Sabang airfield after it was attacked

The attack on Sabang began at 7 a.m. Saratoga's aircraft arrived over the island at that time, and Illustrious' began their attack from a different direction a minute later. The Allied bombers mainly attacked oil storage tanks, shipping and harbour installations. The fighters struck Sabang's airfield and Lho Nga airfield. Three of Sabang's four oil tanks were set on fire and the harbour installations were badly damaged. Few ships were in the area, though a merchant vessel was sunk and another driven aground. The fighter pilots claimed to have destroyed 21 Japanese aircraft at Sabang airfield and another three at Lho Nga. The British pilots failed to engage a number of worthwhile targets of opportunity.

The Japanese at Sabang were taken by surprise. Anti-aircraft batteries began firing on the Allied aircraft after the attack had commenced, and no Japanese fighters were encountered in the air. A Hellcat was shot down, and its pilot was rescued by Tactician while under fire from coastal artillery. Clifton led a group of fighter aircraft which drove off a Japanese torpedo boat that was threatening the submarine during the rescue. Eleven other American aircraft were damaged.

As the Allied fleet withdrew, it was approached by three Japanese Mitsubishi G4M torpedo bombers. All were shot down by Hellcats about 50 miles (80 km) to the north-east of the ships. Allied warships fired on Japanese aircraft twice during the night of 19/20 April. Some of the destroyers also fired at what turned out to be an Allied Douglas DC-3 transport aircraft that was flying from Cocos Islands with its identification friend or foe system turned off. During a rain squall in the afternoon of 20 April Renown mistook the Australian destroyer HMAS Nepal for a Japanese vessel and briefly engaged it with her secondary armament. The attack force returned to Ceylon on 21 April.

== Aftermath ==
The Allies were satisfied with the results of Operation Cockpit. While it did not inflict heavy casualties on the Japanese, the Royal Navy learned useful lessons. In particular, the British were impressed with the more efficient ways Saratoga's crew managed flying operations. Clifton was made an honorary companion of the Distinguished Service Order for his role in the operation. The attack had no effect on Japan's military strategy or deployments. The aircraft in southern Malaya remained there, and no changes were made to the plans to resist the Allied landings at Hollandia.

Shortly after the attack force reached Ceylon, Saratoga received orders to return to the United States for a refit. On Admiral King's suggestion, she and most of the other ships involved in Operation Cockpit conducted an attack on Soerabaya on her return journey. This raid, Operation Transom, was undertaken on 17 May. The Eastern Fleet made several other carrier raids during 1944, including a second attack on Sabang on 25 July designated Operation Crimson. This operation involved two British aircraft carriers, and included a battleship bombardment of the island.
