= Richard John Cork =

British World War II flying ace

- Born: 4 April 1917; London, England
- Died: 14 April 1944 (aged 27); China Bay, British Ceylon
- Burial place: Trincomalee British War Cemetery, Ceylon
- Military career
- Allegiance: United Kingdom
- Branch: Royal Navy
- Service years: 1939–1944
- Rank: Lieutenant Commander
- Nickname: Dickie
- Unit: Fleet Air Arm
- Commands: 15th Naval Fighter Wing; 880 Naval Air Squadron; 761 Naval Air Squadron
- Conflicts: Second World War: Battle of Britain
- Awards: Distinguished Service Order; Distinguished Service Cross

Richard John Cork, DSO, DSC (4 April 1917 – 14 April 1944) was a fighter ace in the Fleet Air Arm of the Royal Navy during the Second World War. Cork served in the Battle of Britain as the wingman for Douglas Bader of No. 242 Squadron RAF. When he returned to the Fleet Air Arm in 1941, Cork served with 880 Naval Air Squadron in the Arctic, Mediterranean and Indian Ocean. It was during Operation Pedestal in 1942 that he became the only Royal Navy pilot to shoot down five aircraft in one day, and was the leading naval ace using the Hawker Hurricane. He was given command of the 15th Naval Fighter Wing aboard HMS Victorious before being killed in a flying accident over Ceylon in 1944.

== Early life ==
Richard John Cork was born in London, England on 4 April 1917. He was the son of Harold James Cork and Ethel Mary Cork, of Burnham in Buckinghamshire. In the months prior to the war the Royal Navy encouraged school leavers to enlist by offering them short-service commissions. Cork was one of those that signed up in 1939. Successfully passing an interview and medical, he joined the Fleet Air Arm and was promoted to acting sub-lieutenant on 1 May 1939.

Attached to HMS President Cork was posted to No.14 Elementary and Reserve Flying Training School at Gravesend aerodrome where his flying course began on 21 August 1939. On 28 October, upon completion of his course, Cork was posted to No. 1 Flying Training School at Netheravon and on graduation from this school wrote in his flying logbook "Authorised to wear the flying badge with effect from 20 January 1940".

== Second World War ==
Cork was promoted sub-lieutenant in March 1940. From 21 April until 11 June 1940 he served with 759 Naval Air Squadron and then 760 Naval Air Squadron flying Blackburn Skua dive bombers and Gloster Gladiator fighters and on 11 June he was graded as an above average pilot. A shortage of fighter pilots during the Battle of Britain led to the Fleet Air Arm asking for volunteers to serve with the Royal Air Force. On 1 July 1940, Cork and two other naval pilots joined the Hawker Hurricane equipped No. 242 Squadron under the command of Squadron Leader Douglas Bader; Cork was assigned to become Bader's wingman.

On 30 August, he was involved in his first combat action with No. 242 Squadron. The unit claimed 12 aircraft destroyed, and Cork was credited with a Messerschmitt Bf 110 destroyed and a share in a second. By 13 September he had shot down five aircraft and became a fighter ace. For his exploits he was awarded the Distinguished Flying Cross (DFC) on 18 October 1940. Paul Brickhill states that, at the insistence of the Admiralty, the DFC was exchanged for a Distinguished Service Cross (DSC). However, Hugh Halliday corrects this myth and advises that the DFC was recommended by Bader but actually awarded as the naval equivalent, the DSC, in the London Gazette issue of 18 October, although he confirms that as squadron commander Bader insisted that Cork wear the ribbon of the DFC while serving with the RAF; this is confirmed by contemporary photographs. Out of the 58 Fleet Air Arm pilots seconded to the RAF during the Battle of Britain, 12 of them shot down at least one aircraft, five became aces, seven were killed and two wounded.

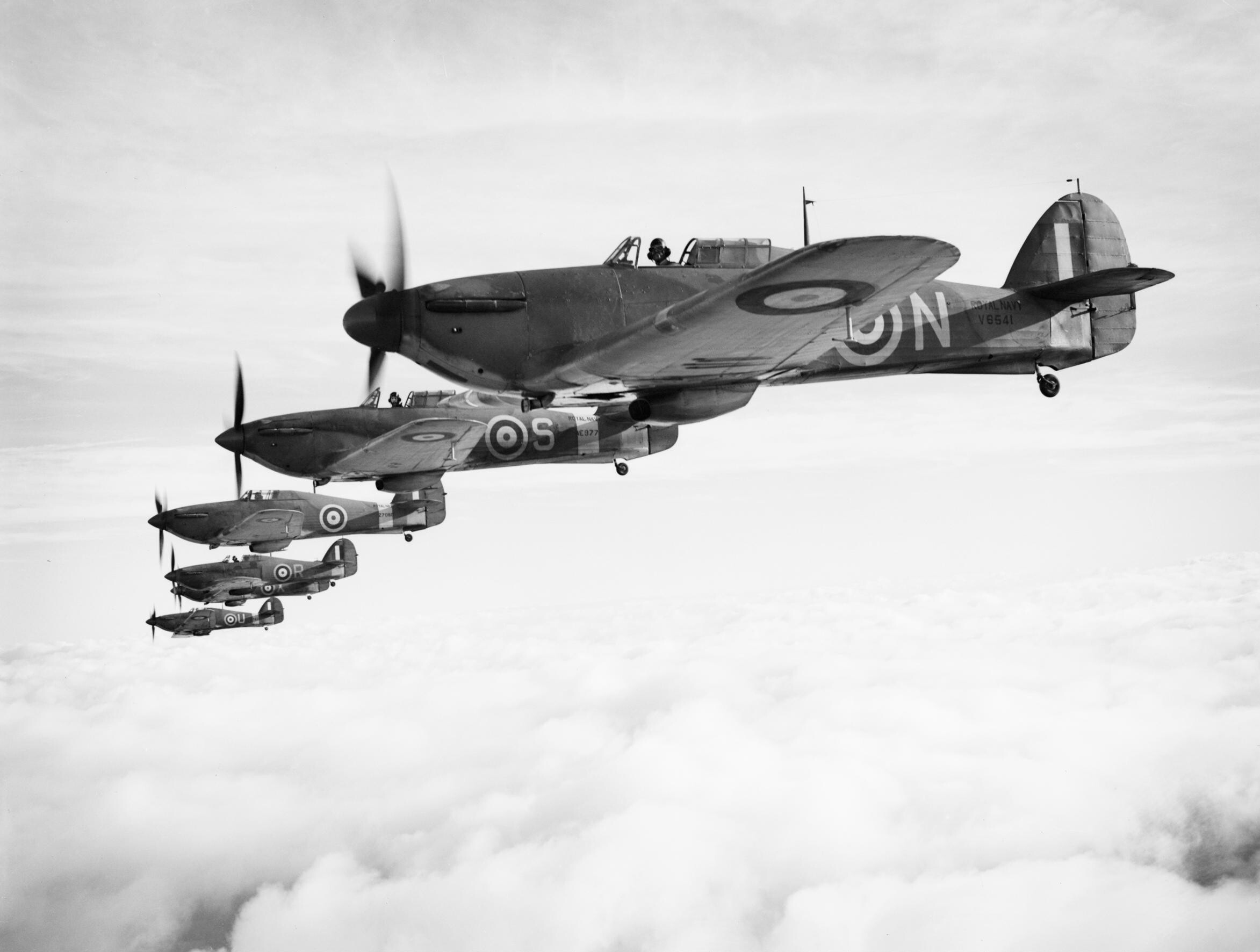
Hawker Sea Hurricanes flying in formation.

Cork returned to the Fleet Air Arm after the battle and was posted to 880 Naval Air Squadron. The unit was equipped with the Grumman Martlet, which were exchanged for Hawker Sea Hurricanes by mid-1941. The squadron then joined HMS Furious for attacks on Petsamo and Kirkenes in Arctic Norway. Cork flew two missions but did not come into contact with the German defenders. After this attack, 880 Squadron joined the newly built fleet carrier HMS Indomitable in October 1941, and Cork was promoted to lieutenant the following month.

One of the squadron's first operations with Indomitable involved the attack on Vichy French gun positions during the landings at Diego Suarez, Madagascar on 6 May 1942. During these operations Cork claimed three Morane-Saulnier M.S.406s and four Potez 63s, all destroyed on the ground. On 12 August 1942, during Operation Pedestal, he became the only Royal Navy pilot to shoot down five aircraft in one day, for which he was awarded the Distinguished Service Order (DSO) on 10 November 1942. Flying a Sea Hurricane, his first success was at 12:30 hours when he shot down a Savoia-Marchetti SM.79 over the convoy. Then, flying off the coast of Tunisia, he shot down a Junkers Ju 88 and shared in the destruction of another. Later in the day he shot down a Messerschmitt Bf 110 and another Savoia-Marchetti SM.79. The squadron leader, Lieutenant Commander F.E.C. Judd, was killed during these battles and Cork as the senior pilot was given command of 880 Squadron. In September 1942 he was promoted to acting lieutenant commander.

In November 1943 he was posted to HMS Illustrious as wing leader of the 15th Naval Fighter Wing, comprising three squadrons of Vought F4U Corsairs, on board HMS Illustrious. The carrier sailed for the Indian Ocean to join the British Pacific Fleet. After arriving Cork was killed in a flying accident while landing at China Bay, Ceylon on 14 April 1944. His final score was nine destroyed, two shared, one probable, four damaged and seven destroyed on the ground. He was fifth on the table of Royal Navy Second World War aces. He was buried in Trincomalee War Cemetery.
