= Sabang =

Sabang may refer to:

- Sabang, Aceh, the westernmost and northernmost city of Indonesia
- Sabang, Paschim Medinipur, village with a police station, in Paschim Medinipur district, West Bengal, India
- Sabang (community development block), division in Paschim Medinipur district, West Bengal, India
- Sabang Merauke Raya Air Charter, an airline based in Medan, North Sumatra, Indonesia
- Sabang, Cabayugan, village in the Philippines
- Sabang (Vidhan Sabha constituency), assembly constituency in West Bengal, India
- Sabangan, Mountain Province, municipality in Mountain Province, Philippines
- Sabang Beach, in Puerto Galera, Oriental Mindoro, Philippines
- Sabang, San Jose, a coastal barangay in San Jose, Camarines Sur, Philippines
