= Lhoknga =

Lhoknga Lhôk Nga
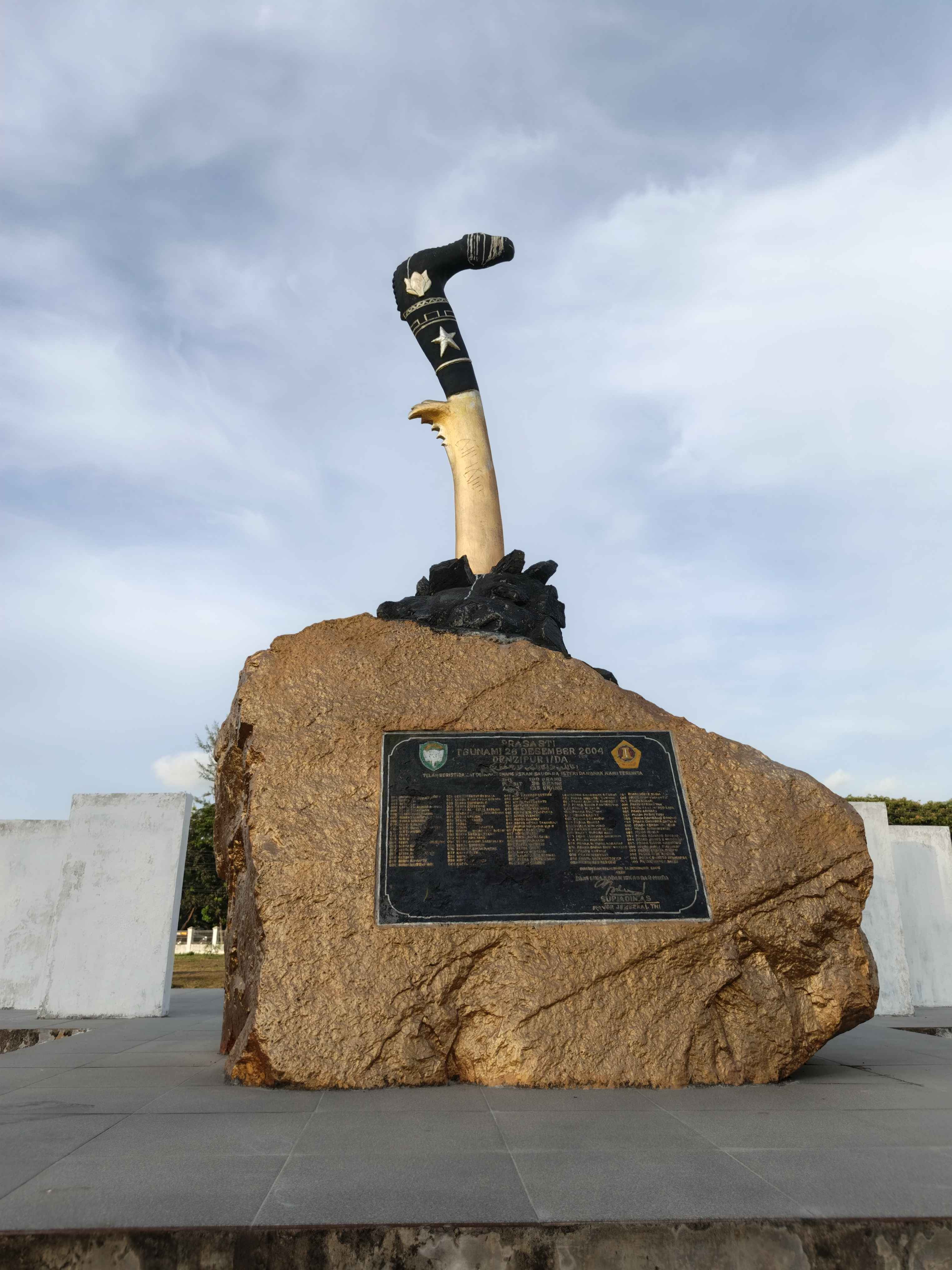
- Denzipur 1 Monument, Mon Ikeun

- Location in Sumatra
- Coordinates: 5°28′42″N 95°14′39″E
- Country: Indonesia
- Province: Aceh

Population (2006)
  - Total: 400
- Time zone: UTC+7 (WIB)

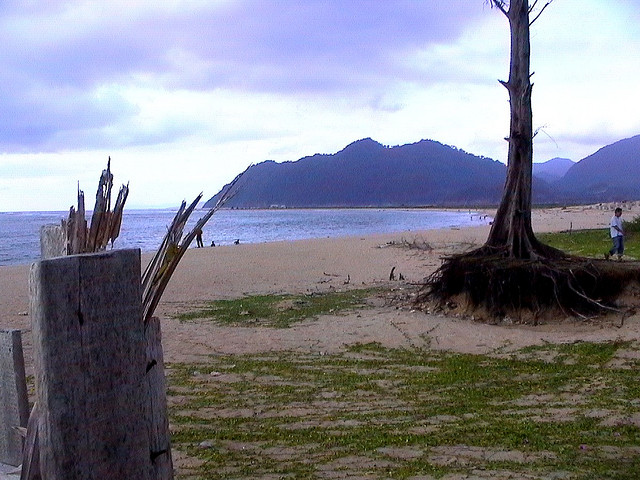
Picture of Lam Puuk Beach near the town of Lhoknga one year after the tsunami disaster.

Lhoknga (Acehnese: Lhôk Nga; Jawoe: تلوق ڠا, pronounced [lʱoʔ ŋa], alternative names Lho'nga, Lho-nga, Lhok Nga) is a town within the district of the same name, in Aceh Besar Regency, Aceh Special Region, Indonesia, located on the western side of the island of Sumatra, 13 km southwest of Banda Aceh. It was completely flattened and destroyed by the 2004 Indian Ocean earthquake and tsunami, where its population dwindled from 7,500 to 400. Tsunami runups following eyewitness accounts of waves were recorded being 35 m in height (waves landing at the height of 35 m), Such high and fast waves arising from the epicentre by megathrusts were later found to be due to splay faults, secondary faults arising due to cracking of the sea floor to jut upwards in seconds, causing waves' speed and height to increase.
