= Operation Diplomat =

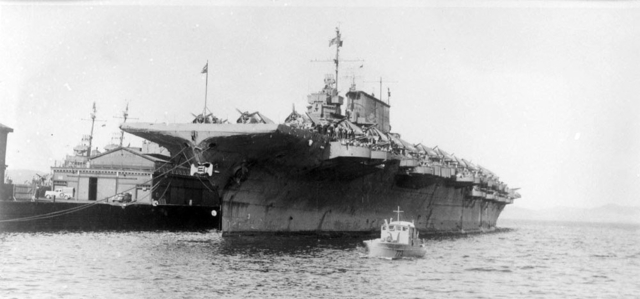
USS Saratoga at Hobart in Australia during March 1944 en route to joining the Eastern Fleet

During World War II, Operation Diplomat was an Allied naval training operation. It was executed in March 1944 by the British Eastern Fleet to practice operational procedures that would be used by ships allocated to the British Pacific Fleet.

Part of the Eastern Fleet left Trincomalee and Colombo on 21 March and arrived at a point some 850 miles south of Ceylon (now Sri Lanka). They rendezvoused, on 24 March, with three tankers escorted by the Dutch cruiser HNLMS Tromp and practised refuelling at sea for the next two days. Later, on 27 March, they met up with the US Task Group 58.5 which consisted of the aircraft carrier USS Saratoga and her three attendant destroyers (USS Dunlap, USS Cummings, and USS Fanning).

The joint fleet returned to Trincomalee, and British Fleet Air Arm aircrew took two intensive days to learn the necessary procedures from American aircrews and learn from their experience. Sources differ on the exact dates of these events. Journal of the Royal New Zealand Navy, implies that training ("exercises") with Saratoga took place before the fleet returned to Trincomalee on 31 March, but The Dictionary of American Fighting Ships, says training occurred after the arrival of the French battleship Richelieu on 12 April. Williams, in the History of HMS Ceylon, states that the joint fleet returned to Trincomalee on 2 April, whereas Journal ibid, quotes 31 March.

The ships from the Eastern Fleet were HMS Renown (flagship of vice admiral second-in-command Eastern Fleet), HMS Queen Elizabeth and HMS Valiant, the fleet carrier HMS Illustrious, cruisers HMS London, HMS Cumberland, HMS Gambia, HMS Ceylon, and ten destroyers.

== External sources ==
- Career of HMS Ceylon, Jack Williams which shares text with A Warship called HMS Ceylon by Richard Boyle published by The Sunday Times.
- Operational history of New Zealand cruisers (from The Royal New Zealand Navy, Sydney David Waters, Historical Publications Branch, Wellington. (Part of: The Official History of New Zealand in the Second World War 1939–1945)
- USN history of USS Saratoga
