= HMS Zebra =

Six ships of the Royal Navy have been named HMS Zebra, after the Zebra.

- HMS Zebra (1777) was a 14-gun sloop launched in 1777. She was abandoned and blown up after going aground on 22 October 1778 at Little Egg Harbor, New Jersey, during the American Revolutionary War.
- HMS Zebra (1780), launched in 1780, was an 18-gun sloop, converted to a bomb vessel, and sold in 1812.
- HMS Zebra (1815), launched in 1815, was the last of the 18-gun Cruizer-class brig-sloops. She spent much of her career based at Port Jackson, Australia. She was wrecked on 2 December 1840 near Haifa.
- A 16-gun brig-sloop was named Zebra in 1846 but renamed Jumna before being launched in 1848.
- HMS Zebra (1860), launched on 13 November 1860, was a sloop of the Camelion class. She was scrapped in 1873.
- HMS Zebra (1895), launched on 3 December 1895, was the lead ship of her class of destroyers. She was sold for scrap in 1914.
- A destroyer of the V and W class was to have been named Zebra, but she was cancelled in 1919.
- A destroyer of the W and Z class was to have been named Zebra, but was renamed Wakeful on the stocks before being launched in 1943.
- HMS Zebra (R81) was a Z-class destroyer, originally named Wakeful, but renamed on the stocks to make way for her sister ship. She was launched on 18 March 1944 at William Denny & Brothers shipyard in Dumbarton, Scotland and commissioned on 13 October 1945.
