= HMS Wakeful =

Three ships of the Royal Navy have borne the name HMS Wakeful. Another was planned but renamed before being launched:

- HMS Wakeful (H88) was a W-class destroyer launched in 1917 and sunk in 1940.
- HMS Wakeful was to have been a Z-class destroyer, but was renamed HMS Zebra (R81) before being launched in 1944.
- HMS Wakeful (1943) was a W-class destroyer, originally built as HMS Zebra but renamed before being launched in 1943. She was converted to a Type 15 frigate between 1951 and 1953, and was sold in 1971.
- HMS Wakeful (A236) was a support vessel commissioned in 1974, paid off in 1987 and sold in 1988.
