= 113 Squadron (Israel) =

Israeli military unit

- טייסת הצרעה
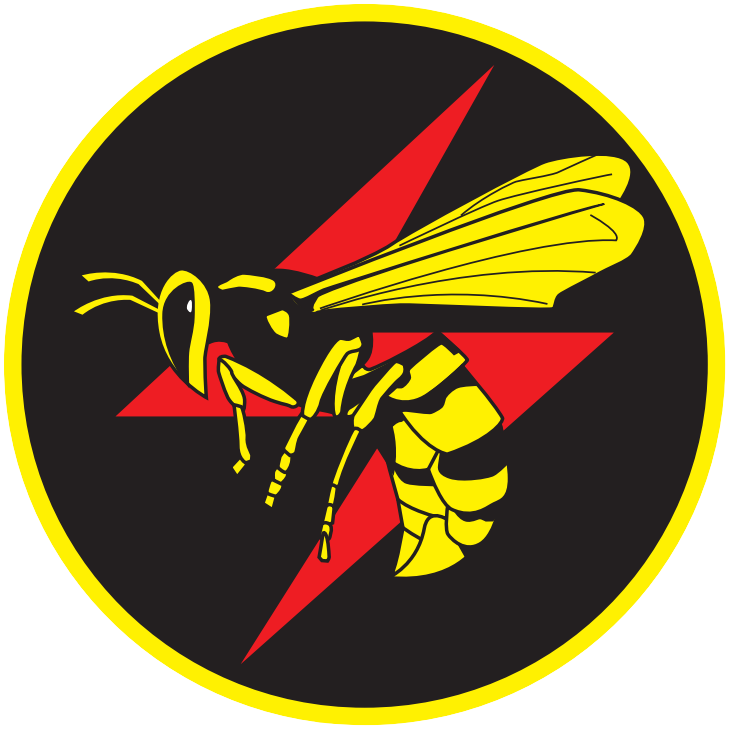
- Hornet Squadron
- Active: 1955–1987, 2005–present
- Country: Israel
- Allegiance: Israel Defense Forces
- Branch: Israeli Air Force
- Type: Attack Helicopter Squadron
- Role: Air Defence/Ground Support
- Garrison/HQ: Ramon Airbase

Aircraft flown
- Attack helicopter: AH-64D Apache Longbow

The 113 Squadron of the Israeli Air Force, also known as the Tayeset Ha'Tsira'a (Hornet or Wasp Squadron). The squadron operates AH-64D Apache Longbows.

== History ==
The "Wasp" squadron was established on October 4, 1955, at Hatzor Airbase as the second jet squadron of the Air Force and was the first to operate the French Oragan aircraft.

The motif of the squadron's insignia, which consisted of a yellow-brown wasp, against a background of red lightning in a black circle, was taken from a parallel squadron that operated the Oragans in the French Air Force.

On April 12, 1956, about half a year before Operation Kadesh, Lt. David Kishon shot down an Egyptian plane over Nitsana and was thus the first shot down of the squadron.

During Operation Kadesh, the squadron attacked ground targets and air battles. Among the targets that the squadron attacked was the Egyptian destroyer ' Ibrahim El Awal ', along with other fighter planes from the corps.

Shortly after the war, the squadron became part of the training course for the new fighter pilots and began to conduct the KAM courses. The Uragan aircraft were taken out of service in March 1973.

With the opening of the Six Day War, the squadron participated in Operation Moked to destroy the air forces of the Arab countries. Later in the war, the squadron engaged in attacking ground targets on all fronts and assisting the ground forces.

The squadron took over the Eagle planes (IAI Nesher) that were produced by the aerospace industry and were used for interception and bombing. The operation of these planes was considered top secret due to the embargo imposed by France after the Six Day War. The planes arrived in parts and were assembled in Israel with tacit agreement.

In the Yom Kippur War the squadron operated mainly in interception missions both from the squadron in Hatzor and in deployments from Rafidim in Sinai. During the war, the squadron was credited with shooting down 55 enemy planes, including three Libyan Mirage 5 planes operating from Egypt.

The success of the assembly of the 'Eagle' planes as well as their success in battle led the aerospace industry to develop the Kfir planes .

In 1976, the squadron began receiving the Kfir aircraft from the first model and a few years later the more advanced model, starting during the Gulf War as well as in many operations in Lebanon such as Operation Accountability and Operation Grapes of Wrath. The squadron also operated continuously in Lebanon, hitting and thwarting terrorist activity in the northern sector.

As part of the Second intifada, the squadron operated by hitting various targets in the territories and the Gaza Strip.

In 2005, the squadron received the Apache Longbow helicopters, which were named 'Sharf'. Even before reaching full operational status, the squadron fully participated in the Second Lebanon War and participated in operations including Operation Cast Lead and Operation Pillar of Cloud.

== Timeline ==
=== Establishment ===
Following France's agreement to sell jet fighter planes to Israel, it was decided in the Israeli Air Force to establish a fighter-bomber array that would consist of jet planes only.

In September 1955, six pilots began a conversion course for the Oragan aircraft in France, and in October of that year the first 12 aircraft landed at the Hatzor Airbase. The 'Hasara' squadron was established and Captain Binyamin Peled, later the commander of the Air Force, was appointed as its command.

The squadron emblem - a yellow wasp on a background of red lightning in a black circle, was inspired by the emblem of the French hurricane squadron Escadrille SPA 89 Guepe.

=== First operations ===
In the first months of its existence, it was the leading interceptor squadron of the corps.

On April 12, 1956, during a dogfight between a pair of Oragan planes and a pair of Egyptian Vampire planes, one of the Vampire planes was shot down by Lt. David Kishon and its pilot captured.

=== Training Missions ===
In September 1956, the Wasp became an advanced training course squadron (KAM) in calm and an operational squadron in an emergency.

The KAM mission accompanied the squadron until the Oragan aircraft were withdrawn.

=== Suez Crisis ===
The Sinai War was fought between October 29 and November 5, 1956 between Israel and Egypt. During it, the Sinai Peninsula was occupied and many military infrastructures of the Egyptian army were destroyed.

On October 29, 1956, 12 planes from the squadron escorted the 16 Dakota planes that dropped the 890th Battalion at the Mithala crossing in Sinai at the opening of the operation.

On October 31, the pilots Jacob Agassi and David Kishon attacked with rockets the Egyptian destroyer 'Ibrahim al-Awl' which attacked the Port of Haifa and brought about its surrender.

The squadron performed a total of 133 operational sorties in attack, interception and escort missions.

=== Six Day War ===
The Six Day War was fought from June 5 to 10, 1967, between Israel and Egypt, Jordan and Syria and with the involvement of Iraq, Lebanon, Saudi Arabia and other forces.

The war began with Operation Moked, which was designed to gain air superiority. After the operation, the IDF was able to quickly maneuver and occupy the Sinai Peninsula, the West Bank, and the Golan Heights. In Operation Moked, the squadron participated in attacking airports in Egypt, Jordan, and Syria.

During the war, the squadron carried out 450 operational sorties in airfield attack, close aid and interdiction missions.

Four fighters were killed, one was captured by the Egyptians and seven planes were shot down.

=== Accidental shootdown ===
On June 5, 1967, the first day of the Six Day War, a damaged Oragan plane of the squadron was shot down, flying in the direction of Kriya for nuclear research in Dimona . The pilot Capt. Yoram Harpaz did not identify himself and was shot down by the Hawk missile battery of YTNAM 137 which was located at the base "Matchach" and defense of the nuclear research facility. This shooting down was the first combat firing of a Hawk missile in the world, and the first shooting down of the Hawk missile system.

=== War of Attrition ===
The war of attrition began immediately upon the end of the Six Day War, on June 11, 1967. It lasted for about three years and ended on July 7, 1970. The war was fought on several fronts - Egypt, Jordan, Lebanon and Syria.

During the war the squadron participated in missions attacking ground targets.

=== Introduction of Eagles ===
In March 1973, the Oragan planes were shut down and the squadron was closed. The closure was carried out as part of the preparation for the reception of the Eagle and the transfer of the KAM to the " Eagle " aircraft. The Oragan aircraft was replaced by the Eagle interceptor aircraft, which were assembled at the Israel Aerospace Industries.

=== Yom Kippur War ===
The Yom Kippur War broke out on October 6, 1973 in a coordinated attack by Arab armies against Israel led by Egypt and Syria. The war took place mainly in Sinai and the Golan Heights and lasted until October 24, 1973.

At the beginning of the war, the squadron was still in the process of being established, only six months after receiving the "Nesher" planes.

The squadron operated mainly in interception missions, carried out 660 operational sorties, of which 600 were air-to-air sorties and 60 attack sorties on both fronts. The squadron recorded 56 shooting down of enemy aircraft. During the war, the squadron lost one fighter, Captain Menachem Kashtan, whose plane was shot down on October 16, 1973 over the Egyptian Air Force base in Duversoir.

=== Introduction of Kfir ===
In 1976, the squadron began receiving the new Kfir planes at the Hatzor Airbase.

=== First Lebanon War ===
The First Lebanon War was fought from June 6 to September 29, 1982. The war took place mostly in the territory of Lebanon between Israel and Syria and Palestinian militant organizations that lived in Lebanon and carried out attacks in Israel and other countries.

During the war, the squadron carried out 273 operational sorties in interception, aid and prevention, TAKA attack and photography missions.

=== Escorting Sadat ===
The visit of Egyptian President Sadat to Israel on November 19 to 21, 1977 was a historic event.

A quartet of "IAI Kfir" planes of the squadron accompanied the Egyptian plane on its way back to Egypt.

=== Disestablishment ===
In May 1986, it made its farewell flight and was closed.

=== Reestablishment ===
In 1989, it was decided that the Wasp squadron would be re-established at the Ramon base and receive the advanced Apache AH-64A combat helicopters.

On September 11, 1990, the first two helicopters arrived in Israel and the next day first flight was carried out.

=== Operation Night Time ===
The IDF's first targeted countermeasures operation was conducted on February 16, 1992, in which the squadron's helicopters attacked Abbas Mousavi 's convoy of cars in southern Lebanon and successfully completed the mission.

=== The Second Intifada ===
In September 2000, the IDF began a series of operations in the West Bank and the Gaza Strip.

The machine gun formation and the squadron assisted the maneuvering forces throughout the entire operation.

=== Operation Protective Wall ===
A land operation aimed at damaging the militant infrastructure in the West Bank.

During the operation, the squadron carried out hundreds of operational sorties in targeted countermeasures, maneuver assistance and infrastructure attack missions.

=== Introduction of Shahaf ===
In 2005, the squadron received new AH-64D Apache-Longbow helicopters in a unique Israeli configuration that was given the Hebrew name 'Sharaf'.

=== Second Lebanon War ===
The Second Lebanon War was fought between July 12 and August 14, 2006. The war started following the kidnapping of two IDF soldiers - Eldad Regev and Ehud Goldwasser.

The squadron was still in the process of being established and had not yet been declared fully operational.

During the war, the squadron carried out 441 operational sorties in maneuver assistance missions, hunting rocket launchers, attacking infrastructures and escorting military personnel in their missions in southern Lebanon and also the Gaza Strip.

During the war, the squadron lost two soldiers who helped a ground force that was in distress during the battle in the Bint Jebel area. Following a mechanical failure, the helicopter lost its rotor during the flight and crashed. Col. Zvika Luft and Capt. Tam Farkash perished.

=== Operation Cast Lead ===
Operation Cast Lead was conducted between December 27, 2008 and January 18, 2009, against Hamas in the Gaza Strip, following continuous rocket fire from the Strip on the southern settlements. The operation included a maneuver of IDF forces in the Gaza Strip.

During the operation, the squadron carried out 304 operational sorties, launched 334 missiles and fired approximately 25,000 cannon shells in maneuver assistance, infrastructure attack and countermeasures missions.

=== Operation Pillar of Cloud ===
On November 14, 2012, another operation was conducted in the Gaza Strip aimed at deterring Hamas. The operation lasted several days and was air only. The squadron made 18 operational sorties.

=== 2014 Gaza War ===
Operation 'Tzuk Eitan' was conducted between July 8 and August 26, 2014. The purpose of the operation was to inflict significant damage on the terrorist organization Hamas in the Gaza Strip as a response to the massive launch of rockets towards the southern settlements.

In this fighting, the threat of the tunnels was discovered for the first time and the IDF faced 'explosive events' in the territory of the State of Israel and with rocket launches that reached the range of the squadron and the wing.

During the operation, the squadron carried out 923 operational sorties in attack missions and assisting the maneuver of the 162, 36 and 143 divisions, thwarting explosive events, attacking infrastructure and thwarting human targets.

During the operation, heat missiles were fired four times by the militants at the helicopters.

=== Shootdown of an Iranian Drone ===
An Unmanned Aerial Vehicle of the Shahad 141 model entered Israeli airspace. A helicopter of the squadron was launched to intercept and shot it down over Galilee in the Kfar Rupin area. This was the world's first downing of an unmanned aerial vehicle by a helicopter.

One of the Israeli F-16I aircraft was hit by anti-aircraft fire from the Syrian army and crashed near Kibbutz Harduf. The crew of the plane left safely.

=== Operation Guardian of the Walls ===
Operation 'Guardian of the Walls' was conducted on May 10 to 21, 2021, against Hamas as a response to the rocket launches towards the Jerusalem area and the Gush Dan area and later also towards the southern settlements.

This operation was the first operation in which the squadron put into operational use the Slingshot and the Tammuz missiles .

During the operation, the squadron carried out 90 operational sorties for infrastructure attack, countermeasures and assistance for maneuver and interception missions.

=== Operation Dawn ===
Operation 'Breaking Dawn' was held on August 5 to 8, 2022, during the operation the Israeli Air Force attacked a series of targets identified with the Palestinian Islamic Jihad . Taysir al-Jabari, the commander of the northern region of the military arm of the Palestinian Islamic Jihad, and Khaled Mansour, the commander of the southern region of the military arm of the Palestinian Islamic Jihad, were killed in the operation .

During the operation, the squadron carried out 14 operational sorties for the missions of attacking infrastructure, thwarting and assisting the Israeli Ground Forces.

=== Operation Shield and Arrow ===
Operation "Shield and Arrow" was conducted on May 9 to 13, 2023, during the operation the Israeli Air Force killed six senior commanders of the Palestinian Islamic Jihad .

During the operation, the squadron carried out 16 operational sorties for infrastructure attack, countermeasures and maneuver assistance missions.

== Emblem ==
The squadron's emblem is a wasp on a background of red lightning in a black circle with great similarity to the emblem of the French "Escadrille SPA 89" Guêpe (SPA 89 "Wasp" squadron) of the Escadron de Chasse 1/12 Cambrésis.

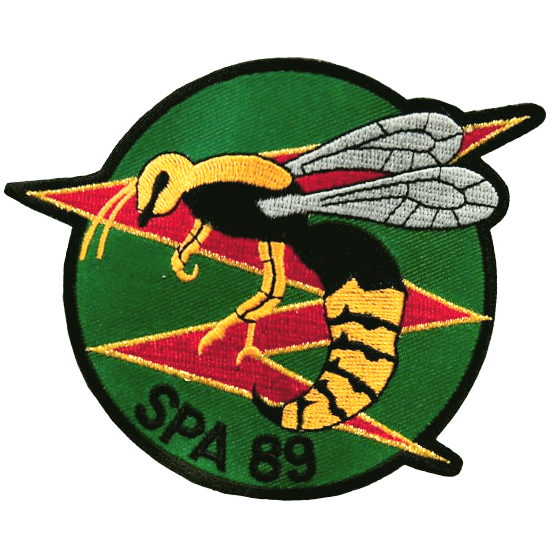
Escadrille SPA 89" Guêpe logo

The previous and current versions of the logo also depict hornets with lightning in the background.

old Squadron logo

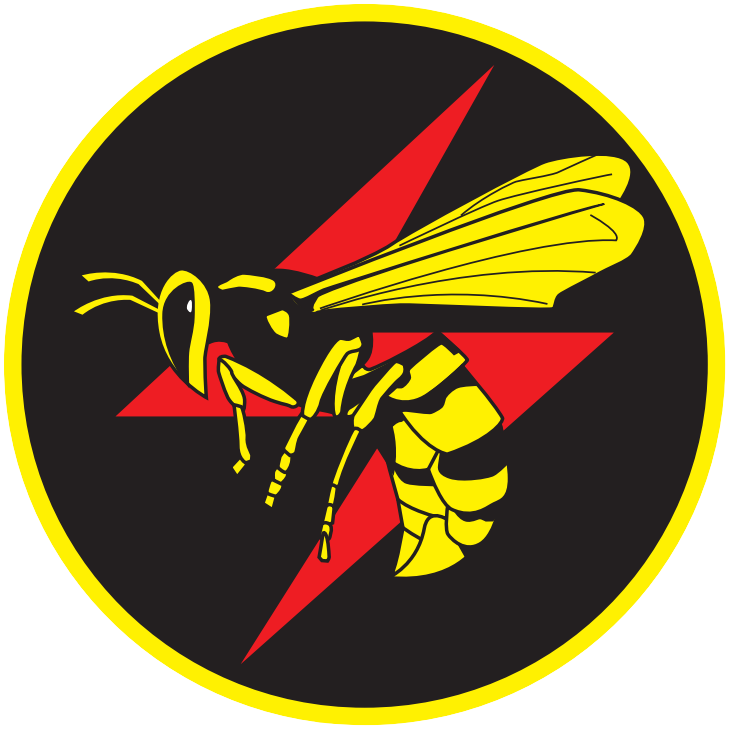
current squadron logo
