= HMS Zealous (R39) =

Israeli destroyer sunk on 21 October 1967

Coordinates: 31.3333331°N 32.5680561°E

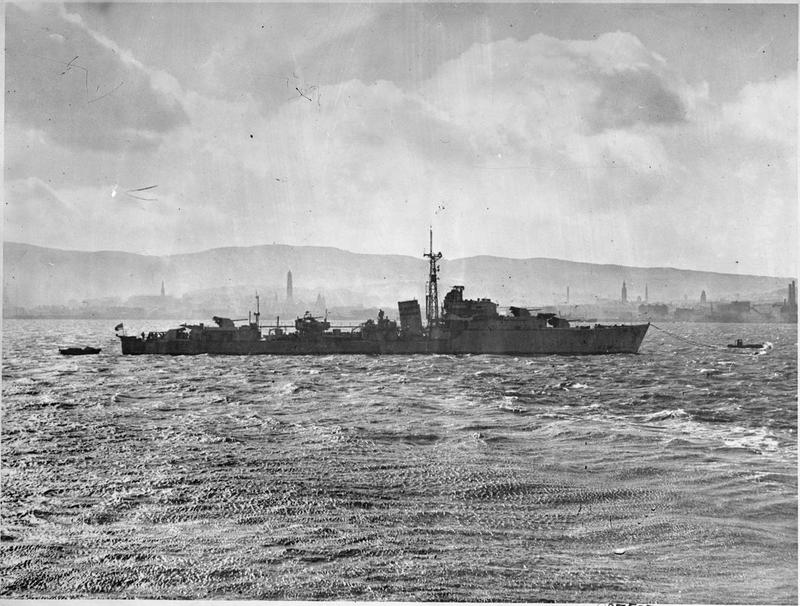
- HMS Zealous moored at Gourock, March 1945

History

United Kingdom
- Name: HMS Zealous
- Ordered: 12 February 1942
- Builder: Cammell Laird
- Laid down: 5 May 1943
- Launched: 28 February 1944
- Commissioned: 9 October 1944
- Out of service: Sold to Israel, 15 July 1955

Israel
- Name: INS Eilat
- Acquired: 15 July 1955
- Commissioned: July 1956
- Fate: Sunk by Egypt on 21 October 1967

General characteristics
- Class & type: Z-class destroyer
- Displacement: 1,710 tons
- Length: 362.7 ft (110.6 m)
- Beam: 35.7 ft (10.9 m)
- Propulsion: Geared turbines; two shafts; 40,000 hp (30,000 kW)
- Speed: 37 knots (69 km/h; 43 mph)
- Complement: 186
- Armament: 4 × QF 4.5-inch (113 mm) guns; 5 × Bofors 40 mm guns; 8 × 21-inch (533 mm) torpedo tubes

HMS Zealous was a Z-class destroyer of the Royal Navy built in 1944 by Cammell Laird. She served during the Second World War, participating in operations in the North Sea and off the Norwegian coast, before taking part in some of the Arctic convoys. She spent a further ten years in Royal Navy service after the end of the war before being sold to the Israeli Navy, which operated her as INS Eilat. She saw action during the Suez Crisis in 1956 attacking Egyptian ships, and was still active by the outbreak of the Six-Day War in 1967. She was sunk several months after the conflict by missiles launched from several small Egyptian missile boats; this made her the first vessel to be sunk by a missile boat in wartime. It was an important milestone in naval surface warfare as it was the first time in history where a ship would be sunk by a missile in ship to ship combat (Weapon used: P-15 Termit), which aroused considerable interest around the world in the development of small manoeuvrable missile boats.

== Design and construction ==
The Z-class were War Emergency Programme destroyers, intended for general duties, including use as anti-submarine escort, and were to be suitable for mass-production. They were based on the hull and machinery of the pre-war J-class destroyers, but with a lighter armament (effectively whatever armament was available) in order to speed production. The Z-class of eight ships formed the 10th Emergency Flotilla, one of five flotillas of War Emergency destroyers ordered under the 1941 War Construction Programme (the U, V, W, Z and Ca-classes (40 destroyers)).

The Z-class were 362 feet 9 inches (110.57 m) long overall, 348 feet 0 inches (106.07 m) at the waterline and 339 feet 6 inches (103.48 m) between perpendiculars, with a beam of 35 feet 8 inches (10.87 m) and a draught of 10 feet 0 inches (3.05 m) mean and 14 feet 3 inches (4.34 m) full load. Displacement was 1,710 long tons (1,740 t) standard and 2,530 long tons (2,570 t) full load. Two Admiralty 3-drum water-tube boilers supplied steam at 300 pounds per square inch (2,100 kPa) and 630 °F (332 °C) to two sets of Parsons single-reduction geared steam turbines, which drove two propeller shafts. The machinery was rated at 40,000 shaft horsepower (30,000 kW) giving a maximum speed of 36 knots (41 mph; 67 km/h) and 32 knots (37 mph; 59 km/h) at full load. 615 tons of oil were carried, giving a range of 4,675 nautical miles (5,380 mi; 8,658 km) at 20 knots (23 mph; 37 km/h).

The ship had a main gun armament of four 4.5-inch (120 mm) QF Mk. IV guns, capable of elevating to an angle of 55 degrees, giving a degree of anti-aircraft capability, with the Z-class being the first class of destroyers to use the new gun. The close-in anti-aircraft armament was one Hazemayer stabilised twin mount for the Bofors 40 mm gun, and six Oerlikon 20 mm cannons (two twin and two single mounts), which was later modified by replacing the Oerlikon cannon with four single 2-pounder (40 mm) "pom-pom" autocannon. Two quadruple mount for 21-inch (533 mm) torpedoes was fitted, while the ship had a depth charge outfit of four depth charge mortars and two racks, with a total of 70 charges carried. She had a crew of 179 officers and other ranks.

Zealous was ordered on 10 February 1942, and was laid down at Cammell Laird's Birkenhead shipyard on 5 May 1942. She was launched on 28 February 1944 and completed on 9 October 1944, being assigned the pennant number R39. Zealous was the third ship with that name to serve with the Royal Navy.

== Royal Navy service ==
=== Second World War ===
After commissioning and working up at Scapa Flow, Zealous joined the 2nd Destroyer Flotilla of the Home Fleet. On 20 November 1944, as part of an offensive against German shipping (and in particular ships carrying Iron ore) passing through Norwegian coastal waters, Zealous, together with the destroyers Onslaught, Scorpion and Scourge and the cruiser Diadem, escorted the escort carriers Premier and Pursuer as the carriers' aircraft laid mines off Haugesund. On 7–14 December 1944, Zealous took part in Operation Urbane, another anti-shipping operation off the coast of Norway involving the carriers Implacable, Premier and Trumpeter during Arctic convoy RA 62. The carriers' aircraft laid mines and sank two merchant ships. Part of the force, including Zealous, was spotted by German reconnaissance aircraft on 14 December. In response, the Germans launched a 30-aircraft strong torpedo-bomber strike, but it failed to find the British force.

On 6 February 1945, Zealous joined the close escort of Arctic Convoy JW 64. The Germans deployed 8 U-boats near Bear Island with a further 4 U-boats off the Kola Inlet, and carried out two large air attacks on the convoy, but only one escort, the corvette Denbigh Castle was lost, torpedoed by the German submarine U-992, with no merchant ships hit. Zealous, along with the destroyers HMS Zambesi, HMS Zest, and HMCS Sioux were detached from the convoy on 14 February in order to rescue the population of Sørøya island, Norway, 60 miles (97 km) behind enemy lines. The four destroyers rescued 525 Norwegians, who had been hiding from German patrols in caves on the snow-covered mountains for three months. The Norwegians were safely evacuated via the return RA 64 to the British port of Gourock. On 16 February, Zealous took part in an operation by British and Soviet ships to drive away U-boats that were waiting outside the Kola Inlet. The convoy sailed on 17 February, with Zealous again part of the close escort. Two escorts (the sloop Lark and the corvette Bluebell) and two merchant ships (Thomas Scott and Henry Bacon) were lost, with one U-boat (U-425) also sunk.

On 5 April 1945 Zealous was involved in an attack on a convoy entering the Jøssingfjorden on the coast of Norway. One merchant ship was sunk and two were damaged. On 18 April 1945, Zealous joined the escort of Arctic Convoy JW 66, which arrived at the Kola Inlet on 25 April. On 29 April Zealous set out as part of the escort of the return convoy RA 66, leaving the convoy on 5 May. The war in Europe ended on VE Day on 8 May 1945, and on 9 May, Zealous was part of a force of two cruisers (Birmingham and Dido) and four destroyers (Zealous, Zephyr, Zest and Zodiac), that helped to liberate Copenhagen, with the force taking the surrender of the German naval forces based there. Zealous and Zodiac then moved on to occupation duties at Kiel.

=== Post-war service ===
Zealous was refitted at Devonport from July 1945, From October 1945 until August 1946 Zealous served in the 2nd Destroyer Flotilla as part of the Home Fleet. She carried out more occupation duties in north German ports in November–December 1945. From 1947 until 1950 she was held in reserve at Devonport. Between 1950 and 1951 she underwent a refit at Cardiff. During 1953 she was refitted by Harland and Wolff at Liverpool. Between 1953 and 1954 she was held in reserve at Penarth.

== Service as Eilat ==
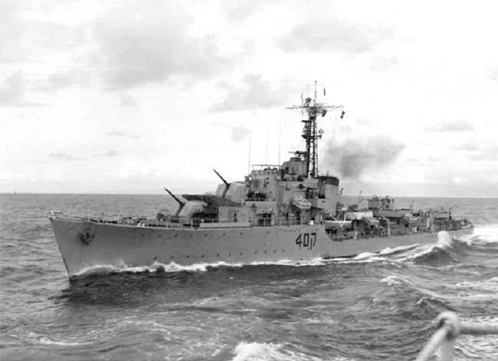
INS Eilat

In 1955, the UK sold Zealous to Israel, which commissioned her into the Israeli Navy as INS Eilat (after the Israeli southern coastal city of Eilat, replacing the earlier INS Eilat) in July 1956. On the morning of 31 October, in the midst of the Suez Crisis, the Egyptian destroyer Ibrahim el Awal (an ex-British Hunt class destroyer) shelled Haifa harbour. A counter-attack by the French destroyer Kersaint and by the Israeli Yaffo and Eilat forced the Egyptian destroyer to steam back towards Port Said. It was then also attacked by a pair of Israeli Air Force Ouragans and a Dakota. The crew of the badly damaged vessel finally capitulated, and the Israelis towed the ship to Haifa; it later became the Haifa in the Israeli Navy.

On a patrol during the night of 11–12 July 1967, Eilat and two Israeli torpedo-boats encountered two Egyptian torpedo-boats off the Rumani coast. They immediately engaged the vessels and sank both.

=== Sinking ===
Sinking of the Destroyer Eilat
- Part of the War of Attrition
| Date | October 21, 1967 |
| Location | Mediterranean Sea, east of Port Said. |
| Result | Egyptian victory |

Belligerents
| Israel | Egypt |

Commanders and leaders
| Isaac Shoshan | Ahmed Shaker |

Casualties and losses
| 47 killed 91 wounded sinking of a destroyer | None |

In an early event in the War of Attrition, Eilat was sunk on 21 October 1967 in Mediterranean international waters off Port Said in the Sinai, hit by three Soviet-made Styx missiles launched by Egyptian missile boats. An Egyptian Komar-class missile boat positioned within the harbour at Port Said fired two missiles at the Israeli destroyer. Eilat's radar did not reveal any suspicious activity or movements because the Egyptians launched the missiles from within the port. Eilat's captain ordered evasive action when the missiles were detected, but the first missile hit the ship just above the waterline at 5:32 p.m. Two minutes later, the second missile struck, causing additional casualties. While Eilat began to list heavily, the crew tended to the wounded and engaged in rescue and repair operations while waiting for additional ships of the Israeli Navy to come to their rescue. Approximately one hour later, another Egyptian Komar-class missile boat from Port Said harbour fired two more Styx missiles at Eilat. The third missile hit Eilat amidships, causing more damage and further fires, while the fourth went astray and crashed in the water nearby. Eilat sank about two minutes later. Out of a crew of 199, 47 were killed or missing and 90–100 were wounded.

=== Aftermath of the sinking ===
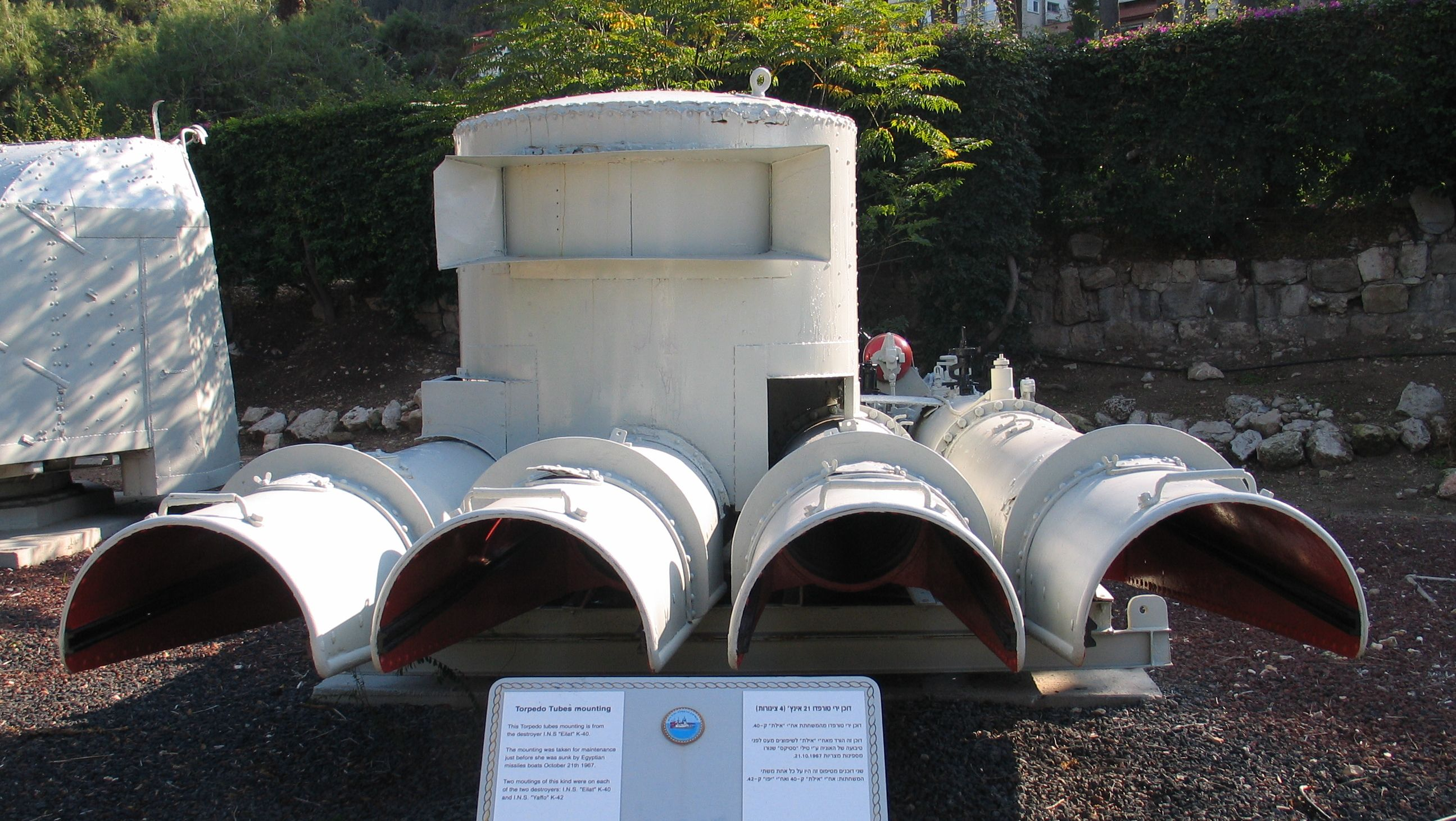
Torpedo tubes from INS Eilat

The sinking just months after its defeat in the Six-Day War caused brief jubilation in the Arab World and crowds gathered to cheer the two missile boats upon their return to Port Said. In Israel, angry crowds surrounded Chief of Staff Yitzhak Rabin and newspaper editorials demanded vengeance. Sixty-seven hours after the attack, Israel retaliated by shelling Port Suez with heavy mortars. Two of the site's three oil refineries were destroyed with the smallest one left standing. The refineries produced all of Egypt's cooking and heating gas, and 80% of its oil. Other areas of the city were hit. Israel ignored or pleaded "technical difficulties" to UN requests for a ceasefire. The Soviet Union sent seven warships on a "courtesy call" to Egyptian ports to dissuade Israel from further attacks.

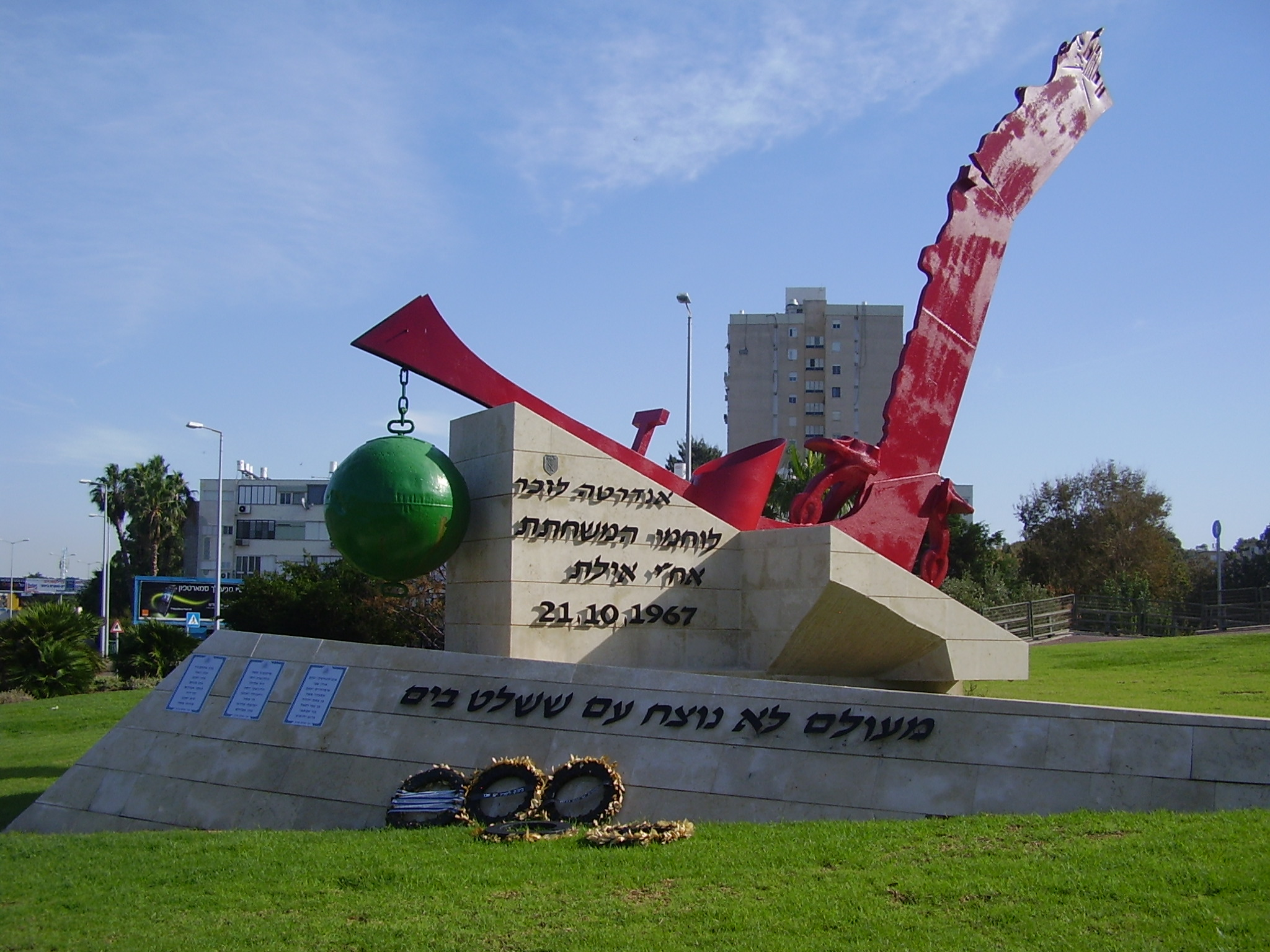
Monument to the Fallen of INS Eilat, Haifa. Sculptor: Igael Tumarkin

The sinking of Eilat by surface-to-surface missiles inaugurated a new era in the development of naval weapons and the formulation of naval strategy throughout the world. Though not highly publicized at the time, the sinking had a considerable impact on the Israeli Navy. Israel started to develop plans for German-influenced ship designs better suited to missile combat, principally small and efficient boats armed with missiles, able to patrol Israeli shores and undertake offshore operations at high speed, while at the same time able to evade enemy tracking and missiles. The resulting focus on new, more agile, missile-armed boats (see Sa'ar 2-class missile boat) would reap major benefits for the Israeli navy six years later during the Yom Kippur War.

A set of torpedo tubes removed from Eilat before her sinking are preserved at the Clandestine Immigration and Naval Museum, Haifa, and a Monument to the Fallen of INS Eilat was established just outside the Museum, the work of sculptor Igael Tumarkin.

== See also ==
- List of ships sunk by missiles
