= HMS Zodiac =

Destroyer of the Royal Navy

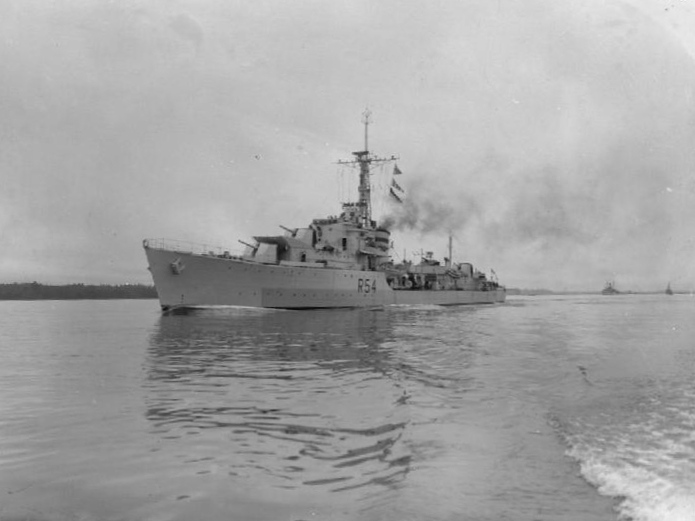
- HMS Zodiac, 23 March 1945

History

United Kingdom
- Name: HMS Zodiac
- Ordered: 12 February 1942
- Builder: John I. Thornycroft, Woolston
- Laid down: 7 November 1942
- Launched: 11 March 1944
- Commissioned: 23 October 1944
- Identification: Pennant number: R54 initially, but changed to D54 in 1945
- Motto: 'Faythe hath no fear'
- Honours and awards: Arctic 1945
- Fate: Sold to Israel, 15 July 1955
- Badge: On a Field Blue, a bezant rayed Gold on each point a bezant charged with the zodiac signs Black

History

Israel
- Name: INS Yaffo
- Acquired: 15 July 1955
- Commissioned: July 1956
- Out of service: 1972
- Identification: Pennant number: K-42
- Fate: Scrapped
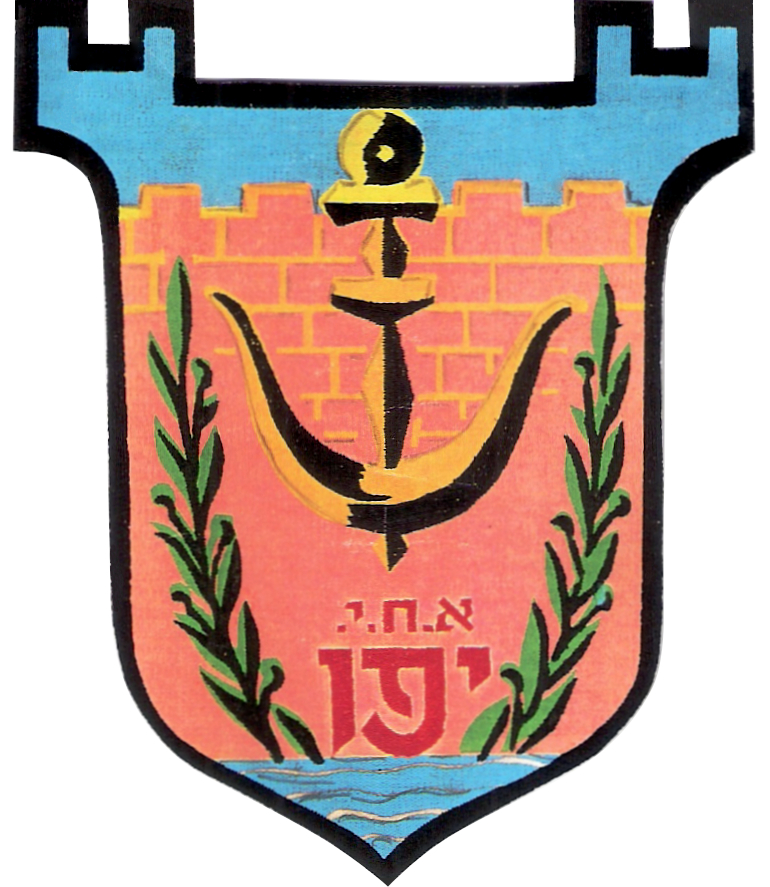
- Badge

General characteristics
- Class & type: Z-class destroyer
- Displacement: 1,710 tons
- Length: 362.7 ft (110.6 m)
- Beam: 35.7 ft (10.9 m)
- Propulsion: Geared turbines; two shafts; 40,000 hp (30 MW)
- Speed: 37 knots (69 km/h; 43 mph)
- Complement: 186
- Armament: 4 х 4.5 inch guns; 5 х 40 mm guns; 8 х Torpedo tubes

HMS Zodiac was a Z-class destroyer of the Royal Navy built in 1944 by John I. Thornycroft, Woolston. She served during the Second World War, participating in operations in the North Sea and off the Norwegian coast, before taking part in some of the Arctic convoys. She spent a further ten years in Royal Navy service after the end of the war, before being sold to the Israeli Navy, which operated her as INS Yaffo. She saw action during the Suez Crisis in 1956, attacking Egyptian ships and was still active by the outbreak of the Six-Day War in 1967.

== Second World War ==
On commissioning and work up Zodiac joined the 2nd Destroyer Flotilla, as part of the Home Fleet. She operated in the North West approaches and escorted some Russian convoys. In 1945 she was part of the 29th Destroyer Flotilla along with Zephyr and Zest; she was briefly stationed in the port of Wilhelmshaven, the main base of the Kriegsmarine.

== Postwar service ==
In 1946 Zodiac was part of the 2nd Destroyer Flotilla. Between 1947 and 1948 she was held in reserve at Portsmouth. In 1949 she was part of the 2nd Training Flotilla based at Portland. In 1952 she was placed in reserve at Portsmouth and in 1954 was given a refit at Penarth, prior to being sold to Israel on 15 July 1955 with sister ship Zealous.

== Israeli service ==
Zodiac was sold to Israel in 1955 and commissioned into the Israeli Navy as INS Yaffo. She was refitted by Crighton at Liverpool and sailed for Israel in 1956.

On the morning of 31 October 1956, in the midst of the Suez Crisis, Egyptian destroyer Ibrahim el Awal, (an ex-British Hunt class destroyer), shelled Haifa harbor. A counter-attack by Yaffo and another Israeli destroyer Eilat, along with the Kersaint forced the Egyptian destroyer to steam back towards Port Said. Ibrahim al-Awal was then also attacked by a pair of IDF/AF Ouragans and a Dakota. The crew of the badly damaged vessel finally capitulated, and the ship was towed by the Israelis to Haifa, later becoming Haifa in the Israeli Navy.

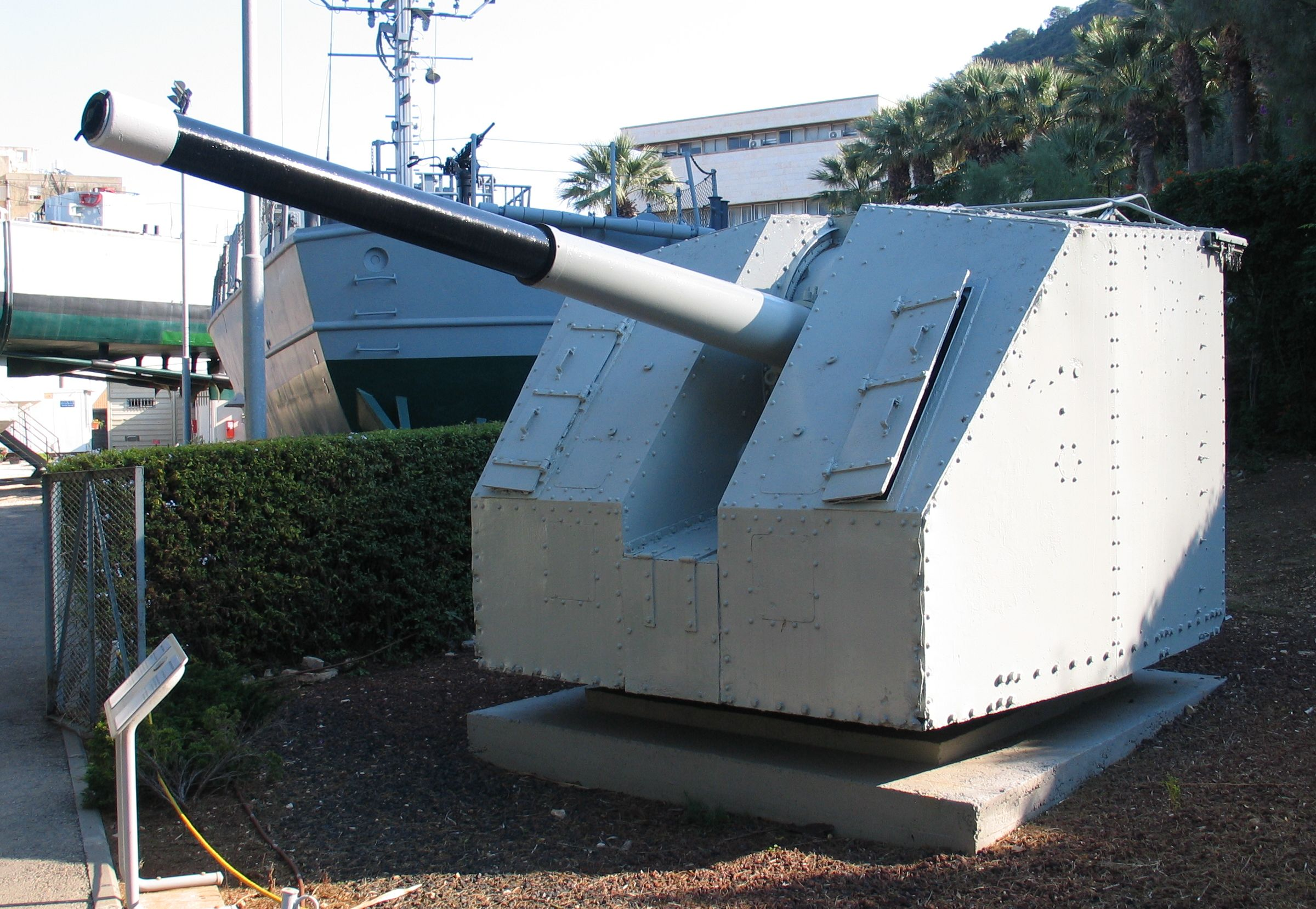
4.5-inch gun from INS Yaffo

Eilat(K 40) has been targeted by Egyptian missiles boats towards Port-Said, and Eilat was sunk on 21 October 1967 in Mediterranean international waters, hit by 4 Soviet-made Styx missiles launched by two Egyptian missiles boats No.: 501 & 504.

== Publications ==
- Colledge, J. J.; Warlow, Ben (2006) [1969]. Ships of the Royal Navy: The Complete Record of All Fighting Ships of the Royal Navy from the 15th Century to the Present (3rd Rev ed.). London: Chatham Publishing. ISBN 978-1-86176-281-8. OCLC 67375475.
- Marriott, Leo (1994). Royal Navy Destroyers since 1945. Ian Allan. ISBN 0-7110-1817-0.
- Raven, Alan; Roberts, John (1978). War Built Destroyers O to Z Classes. London: Bivouac Books. ISBN 0-85680-010-4.
- Whitley, M. J. (1988). Destroyers of World War 2. Annapolis, Maryland: Naval Institute Press. ISBN 0-87021-326-1.
