= Operation Kadesh =

1956 Israeli military operation in Egypt

Operation Kadesh was an Israeli military operation to invade the Sinai Peninsula, as part of the Suez Crisis. The operation received its name from ancient Kadesh, located in the northern Sinai and mentioned several times in the Hebrew Pentateuch.

== Beginning ==
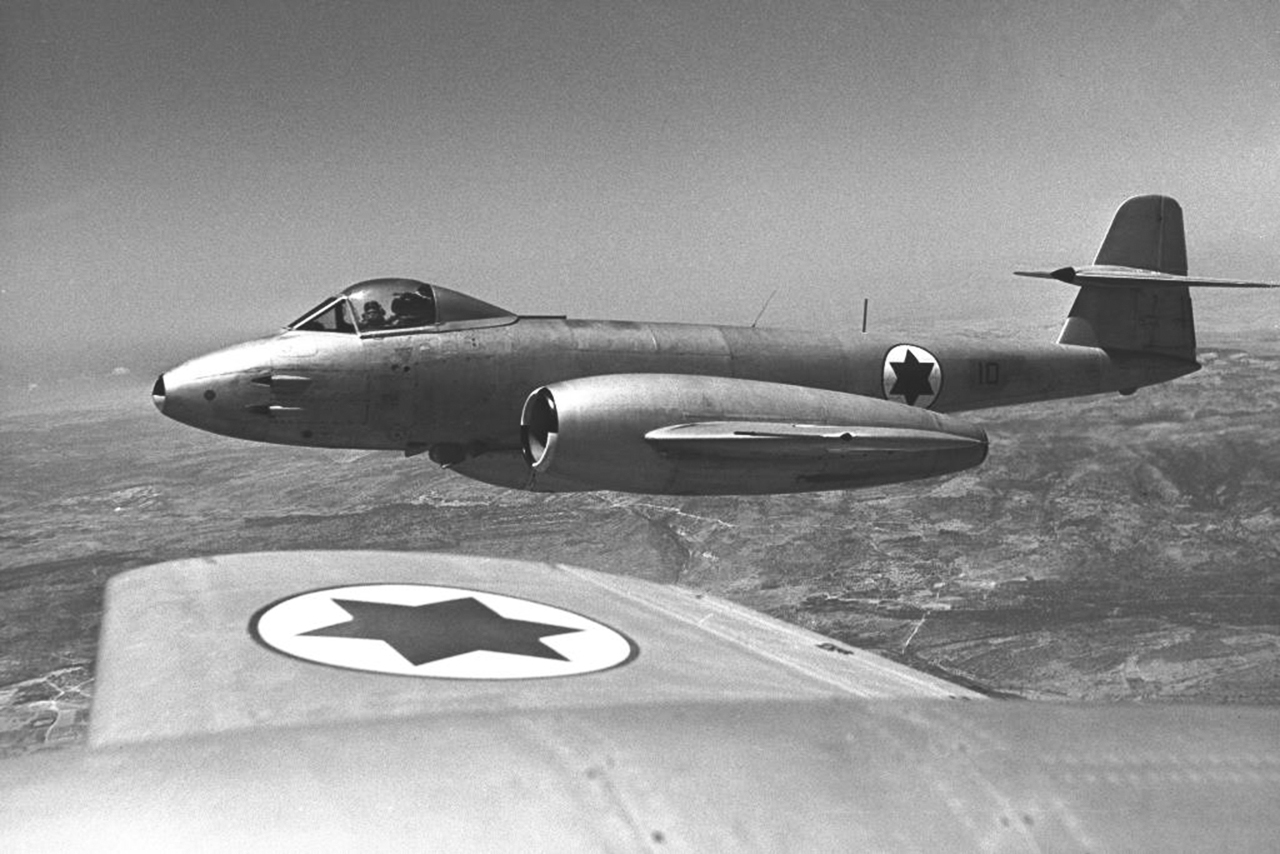
An Israeli Air Force Meteor in flight

The conflict began on 29 October 1956. At about 3:00 pm, Israeli Air Force Mustangs launched a series of attacks on Egyptian positions all over the Sinai. Because Israeli intelligence expected Jordan to enter the war on Egypt's side, Israeli soldiers were stationed along the Israeli-Jordanian frontier. The Israel Border Police militarised the Israel-Jordan border, including the Green Line with the West Bank, during the first few hours of the war. Israeli-Arab villages along the Jordanian border were placed under curfew. This resulted in the killings of 48 civilians in the Arab village of Kafr Qasim in an event known as the Kafr Qasim massacre. The border policemen involved in the killings were later tried and imprisoned, with an Israeli court finding that the order to shoot civilians was "blatantly illegal". This event had major effects on Israeli law relating to the ethics in war and more subtle effects on the legal status of Arab citizens of Israel, who at the time were regarded as a fifth column.

=== Early actions in Southern Sinai ===
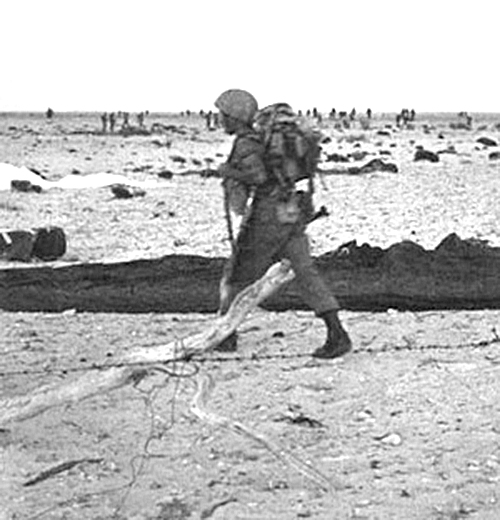
Israeli paratrooper near the Mitla Pass

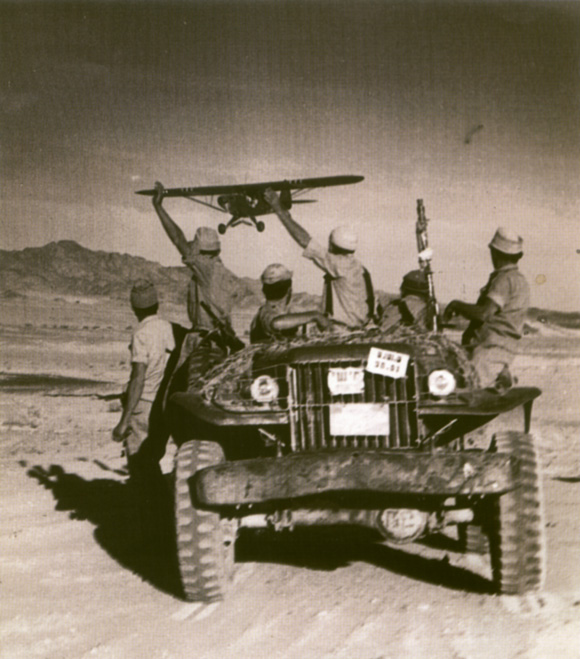
Israeli soldiers in the Sinai wave at a passing French plane

The IDF chief of staff, General Moshe Dayan, first planned to block the vital Mitla Pass. Dayan planned for the Battalion 890 of the Paratroop Brigade, under the command of Lieutenant Colonel Rafael Eitan, a veteran of the 1948 Arab–Israeli War and future head of the IDF, to drop at Parker's Memorial, near one of the defiles of the pass, Jebel Heitan. The rest of the brigade, under the command of then Colonel Ariel Sharon would then advance to meet with the battalion, and consolidate their holdings.

On 29 October, Operation Kadesh – the invasion of the Sinai, began when an Israeli paratrooper battalion was air-dropped into the Sinai Peninsula, east of the Suez Canal near the Mitla Pass. In conjunction with the para drop, four Israeli P-51 Mustangs using their wings and propellers, cut all overhead telephone lines in the Sinai, severely disrupting Egyptian command and control. Due to a navigation error, the Israeli DC-3 transports landed Eitan's 400 paratroopers three miles away from Parker's Memorial, their intended target. Eitan marched his men towards Jebel Heitan, where they dug in while receiving supplies of weapons dropped by French aircraft.

At the same time, Colonel Sharon's 202nd Paratroop battalion raced out towards the Mitla Pass. A major problem for Sharon was vehicle break-down. Dayan's efforts to maintain strategic surprise bore fruit when the Egyptian commander Field Marshal Abdel Hakim Amer at first treated the reports of an Israeli incursion into the Sinai as a large raid instead of an invasion, and as such Amer did not order a general alert. By the time that Amer realised his mistake, the Israelis had made significant advances into the Sinai.

=== Early actions along the Gulf of Aqaba, and the central front ===
As the paratroopers were being dropped into the Sinai, the Israeli 9th Infantry Brigade captured Ras al-Naqb, an important staging ground for that brigade's later attack against Sharm el-Sheikh. Instead of attacking the town by a frontal attack, they enveloped the town in a night attack, and negotiated their way through some of the natural chokepoints into the rear of the town, surprising the Egyptians before they could ready themselves to defend. The Egyptians surrendered, with no Israeli casualties sustained.

The 4th Infantry Brigade, under the command of Colonel Josef Harpaz, captured al-Qusaymah, which would be used as a jumping off point for the assault against Abu Uwayulah. Colonel Harpaz out-flanked al-Qusaymah with two pincers from the south-east and north-east in a night attack. In a short battle lasting from 3:00 am to sunrise, the IDF stormed al-Qusaymah.

== Battle of Jebel Heitan, paratroop brigade under attack ==
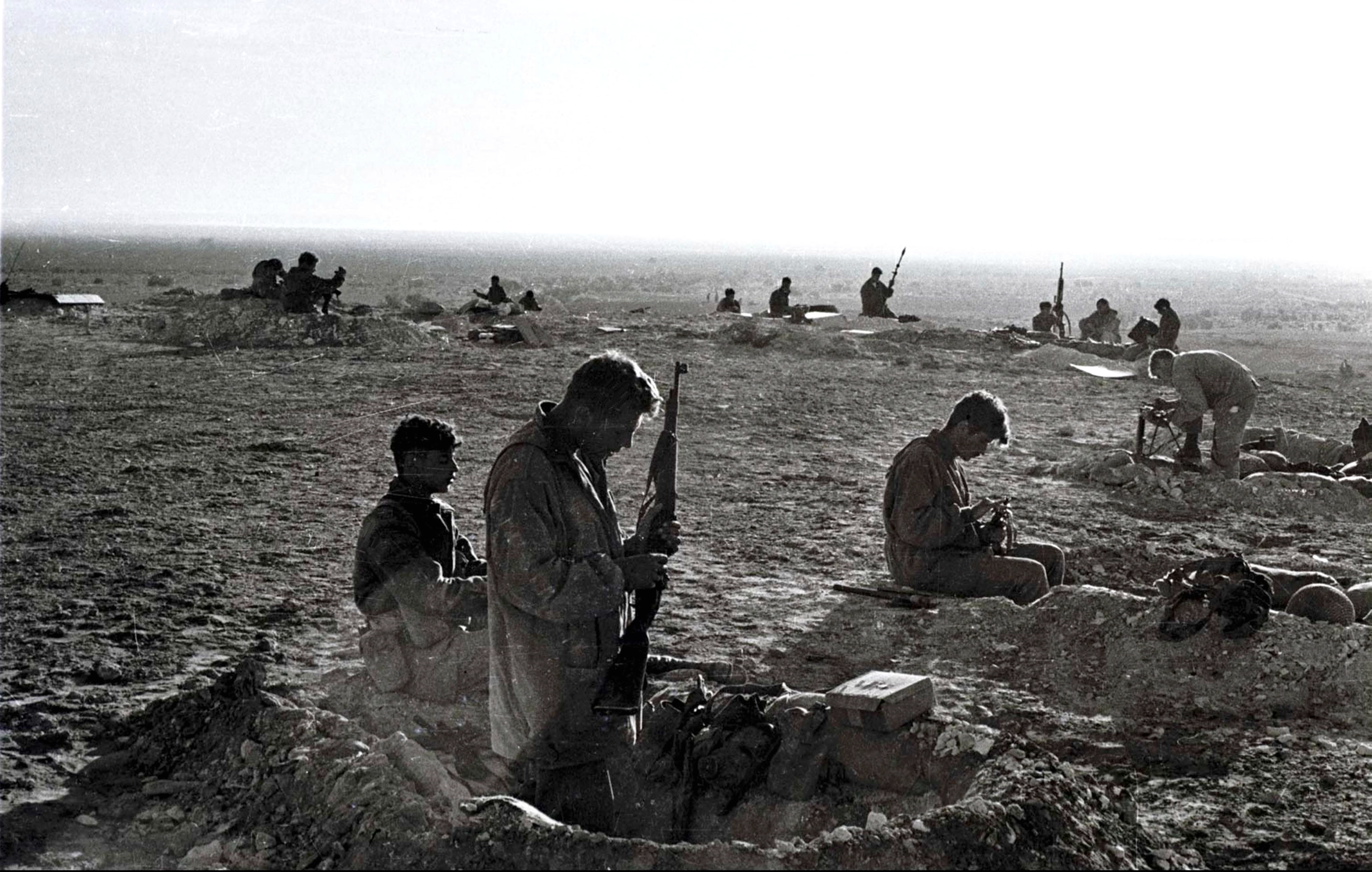
Israeli paratroopers dig in near the Parker Memorial

The portion of the paratroopers under Sharon's command continued to advance to meet with the 1st Brigade. En route, Sharon assaulted Themed in a dawn attack, and was able to storm the town with his armour through the Themed Gap. Sharon routed the Sudanese police company, and captured the settlement. On his way to the Nakla, Sharon's men came under attack from Egyptian MIG-15s. On the 30th, Sharon linked up with Eytan near Nakla.

Dayan had no more plans for further advances beyond the passes, but Sharon decided to attack the Egyptian positions at Jebel Heitan. Sharon sent his lightly armed paratroopers against dug-in Egyptians supported by aircraft, tanks and heavy artillery. Sharon's actions were in response to reports of the arrival of the 1st and 2nd Brigades of the 4th Egyptian Armored Division in the area, which Sharon believed would annihilate his forces if he did not seize the high ground. Sharon sent two infantry companies, a mortar battery and some AMX-13 tanks under the command of Mordechai Gur into the Heitan Defile on the afternoon of 31 October 1956.

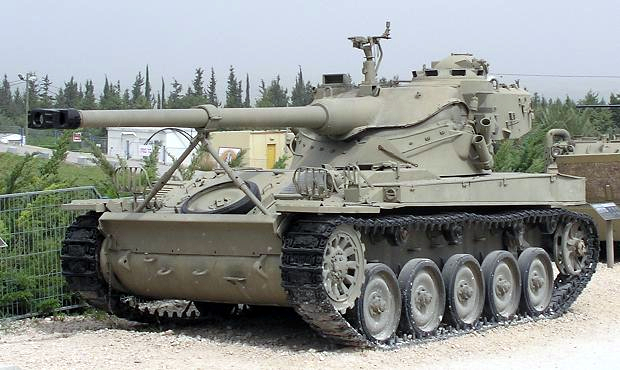
Israeli AMX-13 Light tank

The Egyptian forces occupied strong defensive positions and brought down heavy anti-tank, mortar and machine gun fire on the IDF force. Gur's men were forced to retreat into the "Saucer", where they were surrounded and came under heavy fire. Hearing of this, Sharon sent in another task force while Gur's men used the cover of night to scale the walls of the Heitan Defile. During the ensuing action, the Egyptians were defeated and forced to retreat. A total of 260 Egyptian and 38 Israeli soldiers were killed in the battle.

Although the battle was an Israeli victory, the casualties sustained would surround Sharon with controversy. In particular, Sharon was criticised for ordering the attack on Jebel Heitan without authorisation, and not realising that with the Israeli Air Force controlling the skies, his men were in no such danger from the Egyptian tanks as he believed. Dayan himself maintained that Sharon was correct to order the attack without orders, and that under the circumstances, Sharon made the right decision; instead he criticised Sharon for his tactics of attacking the Egyptians head-on, which Dayan claimed led to unnecessary casualties.

== Air operations, first phase ==
Universal Newsreel from 1 November about the attack on Egypt

From the outset, the Israeli Air Force flew paratroop drops, supply flights and medevac sorties. Israel's new French-made Dassault Mystere IV jet fighters provided air cover for the transport aircraft. In the initial phase of the conflict, the Egyptian Air Force flew attack missions against advancing Israeli ground forces. The Egyptian tactic was to use their new Soviet-made MiG-15 jets as fighter escorts, while their older British-made De Havilland Vampire and Gloster Meteor jets conducted strikes against Israeli troops and vehicles.

In air combat, Israeli aircraft shot down between seven and nine Egyptian jets with the loss of one plane, but Egyptian strikes against the ground forces continued through to 1 November. In a major action on 31 October, waves of Israeli planes attacked the Egyptian 1st Armored Brigade as it moved toward Abu-Ageila, devastating it. According to an Israeli pilot who participated in the attack "Car after car and tank after tank caught fire... At first it looked like a peacetime firing range." Eight Egyptian MiG-15s attacked the Israeli aircraft, damaging two, while Egyptian anti-aircraft fire hit five more Israeli aircraft and killed two pilots. On the following day, with the Anglo-French entry into the war, a combined force of Israeli and French aircraft again attacked the Egyptian 1st Armored Brigade. With the attack by the British and French air forces and navies, President Nasser ordered his pilots to disengage and fly their planes to bases in southern Egypt. The Israeli Air Force was then free to strike Egyptian ground forces at will, as Israeli forces advanced into the western Sinai.

On 3 November, Israeli Dassault Mystère fighter jets attacked a British warship, the Black Swan class sloop HMS Crane as it was patrolling the approaches to the Gulf of Aqaba after it had been mistaken for an Egyptian Navy warship. The ship was attacked with rockets, cannon fire, and napalm bombs. The attack inflicted widespread damage on the hull, damaging two antiaircraft guns, destroying a depth charge thrower, and cutting various electrical circuits and water mains, but the ship's fighting efficiency was only slightly impaired. Three crewmen were wounded in the attack. The ship put up heavy anti-aircraft fire, and there are conflicting accounts as to whether or not it shot down one of the attacking jets.

== Naval operations ==
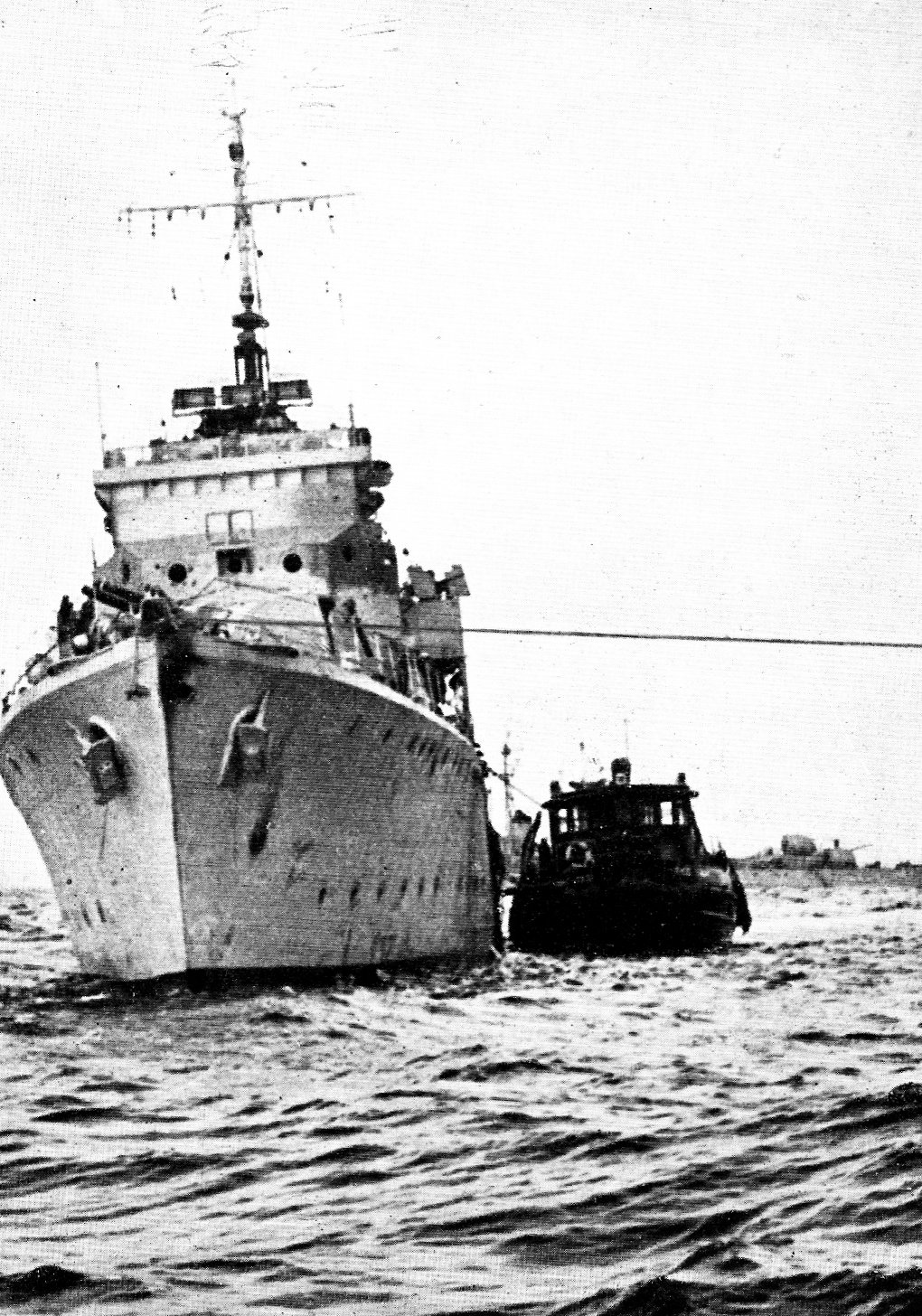
Ibrahim el Awal after its capture by the Israeli Navy

On 30 October, the Egyptian Navy dispatched Ibrahim el Awal, an ex-British Hunt-class destroyer, to Haifa with the aim of shelling that city's coastal oil installations. On 31 October Ibrahim el Awal reached Haifa and began bombarding the city with its four 102 mm (4 in) guns. The French destroyer Kersaint, which was guarding Haifa port as part of Operation Musketeer, returned fire but failed to score any hits. Ibrahim el Awal disengaged and turned northwest. The Israeli destroyers INS Eilat and INS Yaffo and two Israeli Air Force Dassault Ouragans then gave chase and caught up with the Egyptian warship, and attacked it, damaging the destroyer's turbo generator, rudder and antiaircraft guns. Left without power and unable to steer, Ibrahim el Awal surrendered to the Israeli destroyers. During the engagement, the Ibrahim el Awal's crew lost two killed and eight wounded. The Egyptian destroyer was subsequently incorporated into the Israeli Navy and renamed INS Haifa.

On the night of 31 October in the northern Red Sea, the British light cruiser HMS Newfoundland challenged and engaged the Egyptian frigate Domiat, reducing it to a burning hulk in a brief battle, sustaining only light damage in return. The Egyptian warship was then sunk by escorting destroyer HMS Diana. Of the Domiat's crew, 38 were killed and 69 survived and were rescued. British losses in the engagement were one killed and five wounded. On 4 November, a squadron of Egyptian motor torpedo boats attacked a British destroyer off the northeast coast of the Nile Delta. The attack was repelled, with three torpedo boats sunk and the rest retreating.

== Hedgehog–Abu Uwayulah operations ==
The village of Abu Uwayulah, 25 km (16 mi) inside Egyptian territory, served as the road centre for the entire Sinai, and thus was a key Israeli target. To the east of Abu Uwayulah were several ridges that formed a natural defensive zone known to the Israelis as the "Hedgehog". Holding the "Hedgehog" were 3,000 Egyptians of the 17th and 18th battalions of the 3rd Infantry Division commanded by Colonel Sami Yassa. Yassa's men held a series of well-fortified trenches. The "Hedgehog" could only be assaulted from the east flank of Umm Qataf ridge and the west flank of Ruafa ridge.

On 30 October, a probing attack by Israeli armour under Major Izhak Ben-Ari turned into an assault on the Umm Qataf ridge that ended in failure. During the fighting at Umm Qataf, Colonel Yassa was badly wounded and replaced by Colonel Saadedden Mutawally. To the south, another unit of the Israeli 7th Armored Brigade discovered the al-Dayyiqa gap in the Jebel Halal ridge of the "Hedgehog". The Israeli forces stormed and took the al-Dayyiqa gap. Colonel Mutawally failed to appreciate the extent of the danger to his forces posed by the IDF breakthrough at al-Dayyiqa.

Led by Colonel Avraham Adan, an IDF force entered the al-Dayyiqa and at dawn on 31 October attacked Abu Uwayulah. After an hour's fighting, Abu Uwayulah fell to the IDF. At the same time, another IDF battalion attacked the Ruafa ridge.

Concurrently, another attack was launched on the eastern edge of the "Hedgehog" by the IDF 10th Infantry Brigade (composed mostly of reservists) that ended in failure. By noon, the Israeli Air Force had carried out a series of punishing airstrikes on the Egyptian positions, sometimes accidentally hitting IDF ground forces. Such was the tendency of the IAF to stage "friendly fire" incidents the IAF was arguably as much a danger to the Israeli troops as to the enemy.

After taking Abu Uwayulah, Adan committed all of his forces against the Ruafa ridge of the "Hedgehog". Adan began a three-pronged attack with one armoured force striking northeastern edge of Ruafa, a mixed infantry/armored force attacking the north edge and a feint attack from a neighbouring knoll. During the evening attack on 31 October, a chaotic battle raged on Ruafa ridge with much hand-to-hand fighting. Though every IDF tank involved was destroyed, after a night's fighting, Ruafa had fallen to the IDF. Another IDF assault that night, this time by the 10th Infantry Brigade on Umm Qataf was less successful with much of the attacking force getting lost in the darkness, resulting in a series of confused attacks that ended in failure. Dayan, who had grown impatient with the failure to storm the "Hedgehog", sacked the 10th Brigade's commander, Colonel Shmuel Golinda, and replaced him with Colonel Israel Tal.

On the morning of 1 November, Israeli and French aircraft launched frequent napalm attacks on the Egyptian troops at Umm Qataf. Joined by the 37th Armored Brigade, the 10th Brigade again assaulted Umm Qataf, and was again defeated. However, the ferocity of the IDF assault combined with rapidly dwindling stocks of water and ammunition caused Colonel Mutawally to order a general retreat from the "Hedgehog" on the evening of 1 November.

== Gaza Strip operations ==
U.S. newsreel on the Sinai and Gaza invasions

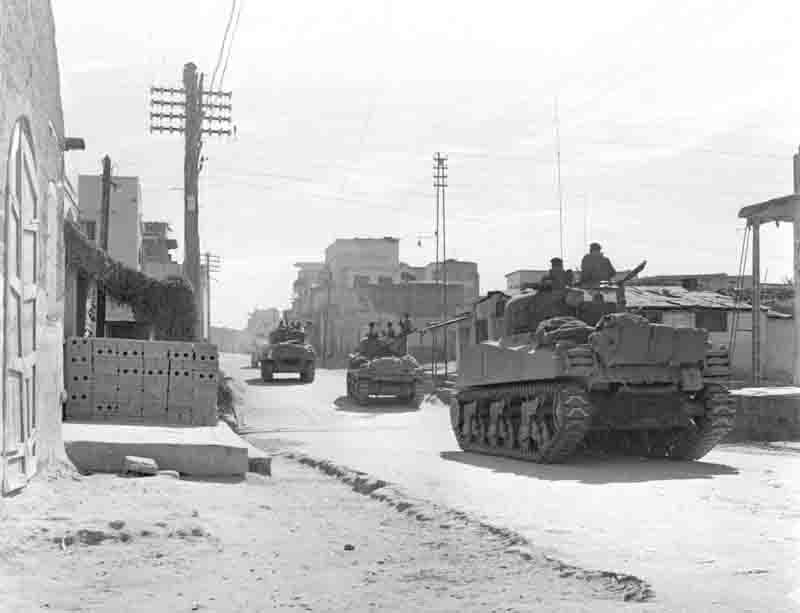
Israeli tanks in Gaza

The city of Rafah was strategically important to Israel because control of that city would sever the Gaza Strip from the Sinai and provide a way to the main centres of the northern Sinai, al-Arish and al-Qantarah. Holding the forts outside of Rafah were a mixture of Egyptian and Palestinian forces in the 5th Infantry Brigade commanded by Brigadier General Jaafar al-Abd. In Rafah itself the 87th Palestinian Infantry Brigade was stationed. Assigned to capture Rafah were 1st Infantry Brigade led by Colonel Binyamin Gibli and 27th Armored Brigade commanded by Colonel Haim Bar-Lev of the IDF. To the south of Rafah were a series of mine-filled sand dunes and to the north were a series of fortified hills.

Dayan ordered the IDF forces to seize Crossroads 12 in the central Rafah area, and to focus on breaking through rather than reducing every Egyptian strongpoint. The IDF assault began with Israeli sappers and engineers clearing a path at night through the minefields that surrounded Rafah. French warships led by the cruiser Georges Leygues provided fire support, through Dayan had a low opinion of the French gunnery, complaining that the French only struck the Egyptian reserves.

Using the two paths cleared through the southern minefields, IDF tanks entered the Rafah salient. Under Egyptian artillery fire, the IDF force raced ahead and took Crossroads 12 with the loss of 2 killed and 22 wounded. In the north, the Israeli troops fought a confused series of night actions, but were successful in storming Hills 25, 25A, 27 and 29 with the loss of six killed. In the morning of 1 November, Israeli AMX-13s encircled and took Hills 34 and 36. At that point, General al-Abd ordered his forces to abandon their posts outside of Rafah and retreat into the city.

With Rafah more or less cut off and Israeli forces controlling the northern and eastern roads leading into the city, Dayan ordered the AMX-13s of the 27th Armored Brigade to strike west and take al-Arish. By this point, Nasser had ordered his forces to fall back towards the Suez Canal, so at first Bar-Lev and his men met little resistance as they advanced across the northern Sinai. Hearing of the order to withdraw, General al-Abd and his men left Rafah on the morning of 1 November through a gap in the Israeli lines, and headed back towards the canal zone. Three hours later, the Israelis took Rafah. It was reported that after taking Rafah, Israeli troops killed 111 people, including 103 refugees, in Rafah's Palestinian refugee camp. The circumstances of the killings are disputed. Not until the Jeradi Pass in the northern Sinai did the IDF run into serious opposition. A series of hooking attacks that out-flanked the Egyptian positions combined with airstrikes led to an Egyptian defeat at the Jeradi Pass. On 2 November, Bar-Lev's forces took al-Arish. Although the city itself fell without a fight after its defenders retreated, Bar-Lev's troops did occasionally come under fire from Egyptian stragglers as they crossed into the Sinai, and Moshe Dayan's radio operator was killed in one such incident.

Meanwhile, the IDF attacked the Egyptian defences outside of Gaza City late on 1 November. After breaking through the Egyptian lines, the Israeli tanks headed into Gaza City. Joined by infantry, the armour attacked the al-Muntar fortress outside of Gaza City, killing or capturing 3,500 Egyptian National Guard troops. By noon of 2 November, there was no more Egyptian opposition in the Gaza City area. On 3 November, the IDF attacked Egyptian and Palestinian forces at Khan Yunis. After a fierce battle, the Israeli 37th Armored Brigade's Sherman tanks broke through the heavily fortified lines outside of Khan Yunis held by the 86th Palestinian Brigade.

After some street-fighting with Egyptian soldiers and Palestinian fedayeen, Khan Yunis fell to the Israelis. There are claims that after taking Khan Yunis, the IDF committed a massacre, known as the Khan Yunis killings. Israel maintained that the Palestinians were killed in street-fighting, while the Palestinians claimed that Israeli troops started executing unarmed Palestinians after the fall of Khan Yunis. The claims of a massacre were reported to the United Nations General Assembly on 15 December 1956 by the Director of the United Nations Relief and Works Agency, Henry Labouisse, who reported from "trustworthy sources" that 275 people were killed in the massacre of which 140 were refugees and 135 local residents.

In both Gaza City and Khan Yunis, street-fighting led to the deaths of "dozens, perhaps hundreds, of non-combatants". Food and medicine distribution for refugees in need of assistance was complicated when some Palestinians ransacked the warehouses belonging to the United Nations Relief and Works Agency. This was compounded by a widespread view in Israel that the responsibility for the care of the Palestinian refugees rested with the UNRWA, not Israel, which led the Israelis to be slow with providing aid. By noon of 3 November, the Israelis had control of almost the entire Gaza Strip save for a few isolated strong points, which were soon attacked and taken. The UN estimated that in total 447 to 550 Palestinian civilians were killed by Israeli troops during the first weeks of Israeli occupation of the strip. The manner in which these people were killed is disputed.

== Sharm el-Sheikh operations ==
By 3 November, with the IDF having successfully taken the Gaza Strip, Arish, the Hedgehog, and Mitla Pass, Sharm el-Sheikh was the last Israeli objective. The main difficulty faced by Colonel Abraham Yoffe's 9th Infantry Brigade was logistical. There were no good roads linking Ras an-Naqb to Sharm el-Sheikh. After taking the border town of Ras an-Naqb on 30 October, Dayan ordered Yoffe to wait until air superiority was ensured.

To outflank Sharm el-Sheikh, Dayan ordered paratroopers to take the town of Tor in the western Sinai. The Egyptian forces at Sharm el-Sheikh had the advantage of holding one of the most strongly fortified positions in the entire Sinai, but had been subjected to heavy Israeli air attacks from the beginning of the war. Yoffe set out for Sharm el-Sheikh on 2 November, and his major obstacles were the terrain and vehicle break-down. Israeli Navy ships provided support to the 9th Division during its advance.

After numerous skirmishes on the outskirts of Sharm el-Sheikh, Yoffe ordered an attack on the port around midnight on 4 November. After four hours of heavy fighting, Yoffe ordered his men to retreat. On the morning of 5 November, Israeli forces launched a massive artillery barrage and napalm strikes against Egyptian forces defending Sharm el-Sheikh. At 9:30 am on 5 November, the Egyptian commander, Colonel Raouf Mahfouz Zaki, surrendered Sharm el-Sheikh. The Israelis had lost 10 killed and 32 wounded, while the Egyptians had lost about 100 killed and 31 wounded. Another 864 Egyptian soldiers were taken prisoner.

== Sources ==
- Herzog, Chaim (1982). The Arab-Israeli Wars: War and Peace in the Middle East. New York: Random House. ISBN 978-0-394-50379-0.
- Risse-Kappen, Thomas (1997) [1995]. Cooperation among Democracies: The European Influence on U.S. Foreign Policy (2nd ed.). Princeton, NJ: Princeton University Press. ISBN 978-0-691-01711-2.
- Varble, Derek (2003). The Suez Crisis 1956. London: Osprey. ISBN 978-1841764184.
