= Nahal Ofir =

Former Israeli military outpost in the Sinai Peninsula

Nahal Ofir ח"ל תרשיש
- Military outpost
- Nahal Tarshish
- A synagogue in Sharm el-Sheikh, with a sign reading "Solomon Area Synagogue"

- Location within Sinai Location within Egypt
- Coordinates: 27°54′44″N 34°19′47″E
- Country: Israel
- Region: Sinai
- Established: 16 December 1956
- Elevation: 1 m (3.3 ft)
- Time zone: UTC+3

Nahal Tarshish (Hebrew: נח"ל תרשיש), also known as Nahal Ofir (Hebrew: נח"ל אופיר), was an outpost established by the Nahal in 1956 following Operation Kadesh, of which the first were established in the Sinai Peninsula and the Gaza Strip. (Note: The second was established in Rafih and was called Nahel Rafih.) The hold was established in the South Sinai Governorate on the coast of Solomon's Bay. The hold's location was very isolated, with the closest Israeli settlement being in Eilat, 185 km away, with no direct road connecting the two locations. The holding included a military settlement of the Nahal alongside a civilian fishing settlement.

== Establishment of outpost ==
On 14 December 1956, less than two months following the Kadesh, and ten days after the IDF began to withdraw from the Sinai, Lieutenant Colonel Moshe Gat of the Nahal stated in the "Order concerning the establishment of Nahal outpost 22 'Ofit' in Solomon Bay":

"In order to ensure free passage for the Israeli Navy in the Gulf of Eilat, the Nahal holding in Solomon's Bay (Sharm el-Sheikh) will be established. The holding in Solomon's Bay will deal with the fishing industry in the Gulf of Eilat and the Red Sea. For this purpose, you will receive fishing vessels through which the members of the outpost will be able to fish and develop the industry."

On the same day, Major Israel Sharaga, an Operations Staff Officer of the IDF, sent a secret letter to the Chief of Staff's office regarding the holding, which was intended to be financed and funded by the Jewish Agency for Israel, with the Navy taking care of logistical matters of getting resources to and from the holding.

The official establishment date of the holding was 16 December 1956. Many experienced fishermen were flown in by plane to the outpost, assigned to teach the soldiers to fish. The soldiers made a living from fishing, and the job was considered the highest priority at the outpost, as opposed to military operations. A portion of the fish was sent north to Israel via aircraft to be sold.

== Evacuation ==
On 24 February, Nahal soldiers were evacuated from the outpost in Sharm el-Sheikh. The official reasoning for the closure of the outpost was that it was too expensive to keep the soldiers there for the little return. Around 15 fisherman and a small military presence were kept until March, when the outpost was closed for good.

On 8 March, the IDF finished evacuating under international pressure, and local pressure from the Gaza Strip and the Egyptian Tiran.
