= R81 =

R81 may refer to:

- R81 (South Africa), a road
- HMS Zebra (R81), a destroyer of the Royal Navy
- HNLMS Karel Doorman (R81), an aircraft carrier of the Royal Netherlands Navy
