= Royston Wright =

Royal Navy admiral (1908-1977)

Admiral Sir Royston Wright GBE KCB DSO
- Born: 29 September 1908
- Died: 18 July 1977 (aged 68)
- Military career
- Allegiance: United Kingdom
- Branch: Royal Navy
- Service years: 1927–1965
- Rank: Admiral
- Commands: HMS Beagle; HMS Derwent; HMS Hurworth; HMS Wakeful; HMS Triumph; Flag Officer Flotillas for the Home Fleet; Flag Officer Scotland
- Conflicts: World War II
- Awards: Knight Grand Cross of the Order of the British Empire; Knight Commander of the Order of the Bath; Distinguished Service Order

Admiral Sir Royston Hollis Wright, GBE, KCB, DSO (29 September 1908 – 18 July 1977) was a senior Royal Navy officer who went on to be Second Sea Lord and Chief of Naval Personnel.

== Naval career ==
Educated at Haileybury College and the Royal Naval College Dartmouth, Wright joined the Royal Navy in 1927. In 1939 he was made commanding officer of the destroyer HMS Beagle. In 1941 he went on to command the destroyer HMS Derwent which was badly damaged by a torpedo in Tripoli Harbour. In 1943 he took command of the destroyer HMS Hurworth which was later sunk later that year during the Aegean Campaign of World War II.

In 1948 he took command of the destroyer HMS Wakeful. He went on to be Director of the Manning Department at the Admiralty in 1950 before becoming commanding officer of the aircraft carrier HMS Triumph in 1953. He became Commodore of the Royal Naval Barracks at Devonport in 1955, Assistant Chief of the Naval Staff in 1956, Flag Officer Flotillas for the Home Fleet in 1958 and Flag Officer, Scotland and Northern Ireland in 1959.

He became Second Sea Lord and Chief of Naval Personnel in 1961: in this capacity he considered a plan to fly sailors' wives out to the Far East Fleet to reduce the strain of separation. He was promoted to full admiral on 26 January 1962, and retired in June 1965.

In 1969 he was Chairman of the Royal Navy Club of 1765 & 1785 (United 1889).

== Family ==
In 1945 he married Betty Lilian Ackery; they had no children. Lady Wright died on 1 January 1988.

Military offices
Preceded by David Luce	Flag Officer, Scotland and Northern Ireland; 1959–1961	Succeeded by Sir Arthur Hezlet
Preceded by Sir St John Tyrwhitt	Second Sea Lord; 1961–1965	Succeeded by Sir Desmond Dreyer
