= HMS Wakeful (A236) =

History

Sweden
- Name: Herakles
- Namesake: Herakles
- Builder: Cochrane & Sons, Selby, North Yorkshire
- Launched: 1965
- Fate: Sold
- Notes: Used as a tug

United Kingdom
- Name: Dan
- Fate: Sold in 1974 for £6,000
- Notes: Used as a tug

United Kingdom
- Name: HMS Wakeful
- Commissioned: April 1974
- Decommissioned: 30 October 1987
- Identification: Pennant number A236
- Fate: Sold to Hellenic Salvage Tugboats
- Notes: Used as a submarine target ship in the Clyde

Greece
- Name: Aegean Pelagos
- Owner: Hellenic Salvage Tugboats
- Acquired: June 1988
- Identification: IMO number: 6518140; MMSI number: 239223000; Callsign: SWSU

General characteristics
- Displacement: Full:900 t (886 long tons); Standard:492 t (484 long tons)
- Length: 38.9 m (127 ft 7 in)
- Beam: 10.7 m (35 ft 1 in)
- Draught: 4.7 m (15 ft 5 in)
- Propulsion: 2 x 9-cylinder Ruston diesels, producing 4,750 hp (3,540 kW)
- Speed: Approximately 14 knots (26 km/h; 16 mph)
- Complement: 18

HMS Wakeful was a support vessel of the Royal Navy from 1974 to 1987. She was built as an ocean-going tug by Cochrane & Sons, in Selby in 1965, and first served as a Swedish civilian tug under the name Herakles.

The ship acted as part of the Fishery Protection Squadron in the North Sea for several years, but was eventually replaced when enough Island-class patrol vessels were available. After a £1.6 million refit at Chatham in 1976, she was assigned to HMS Neptune as a submarine tender, target ship and tug.

She was replaced by HMS Sentinel and decommissioned on 30 October 1987. She was sold to the Greek firm Hellenic Salvage Tugboats in June 1988, having sailed from Portsmouth for Greece the previous month, on 6 May 1988.
