= HMS Zest =

Z-class destroyer converted to Type 15 frigate of the Royal Navy

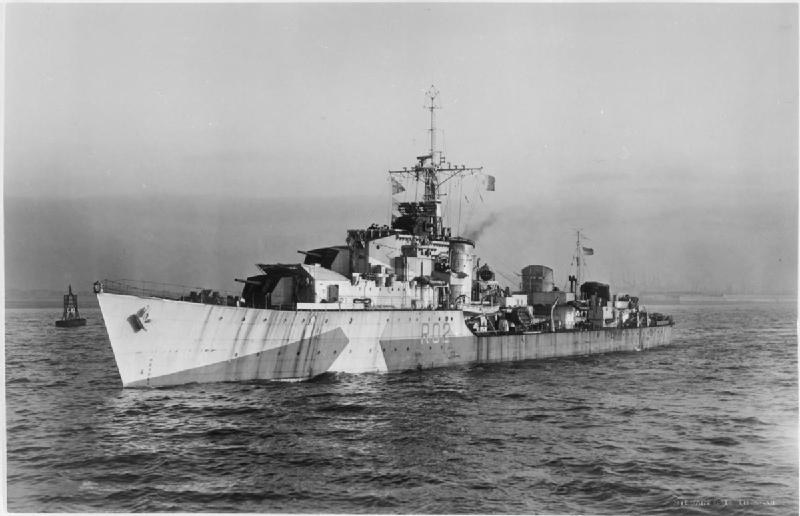
- Zest in December 1944

History

United Kingdom
- Name: HMS Zest
- Ordered: 12 February 1942
- Builder: John I. Thornycroft
- Laid down: 21 July 1942
- Launched: 14 October 1943
- Commissioned: 12 July 1944
- Converted: Type 15 frigate 1954 - 1956
- Identification: Pennant number R02/F102
- Honours and awards: Arctic 1945, Norway 1945
- Fate: Broken up, 1970

General characteristics as W class
- Class & type: W-class destroyer
- Displacement: 1,710 tons (1,730 tonnes); 2,530 tons full (2,570 tonnes)
- Length: 362.75 ft (110.57 m) o/a
- Beam: 35.75 ft (10.90 m)
- Draught: 10 ft (3.0 m)
- Propulsion: 2 Admiralty 3-drum boilers, Parsons single-reduction geared steam turbines, 40,000 shp (30 MW), 2 shafts
- Speed: 36 knots (67 km/h; 41 mph) / 32 knots (59 km/h; 37 mph) full
- Range: 4,675 nautical miles (8,658 km; 5,380 mi) at 20 knots (37 km/h; 23 mph)
- Complement: 179 (225 as leader)
- Sensors & processing systems: Radar Type 272 target indication; Radar Type 291 air warning; Radar Type 285 fire control on director Mk.III(W); Radar Type 282 fire control on 40 mm mount Mk.IV
- Armament: 4 × QF 4.7-inch (120-mm) L/45 Mk.IX, single mounts CP Mk.XXII; 4 × QF 2 pdr Mk.VIII, quad mount Mk.VII, or; 2 × QF 40 mm Bofors, twin mount "Hazemeyer" Mk.IV; 4 × A/A mountings; twin 20 mm Oerlikon Mk.V; single Bofors 40 mm Mk.III or "Boffin" Mk.V; single QF 2 pdr Mk.XVI; 8 (4x2) tubes for 21 inch (533 mm) torpedoes Mk.IX; 2 racks & 4 throwers for 70 depth charges

General characteristics Type 15 frigate
- Class & type: Type 15 frigate
- Displacement: 2,300 tons (standard)
- Length: 358 ft (109 m) o/a
- Beam: 37.75 ft (11.51 m)
- Draught: 14.5 ft (4.4 m)
- Propulsion: 2 × Admiralty 3-drum boilers, steam turbines on 2 shafts, 40,000 shp (30 MW)
- Speed: 31 knots (57 km/h; 36 mph) (full load)
- Complement: 174
- Sensors & processing systems: Radar; Type 293Q target indication.; Type 277Q surface search; Type 974 navigation; Type 262 fire control on director CRBF; Type 1010 Cossor Mark 10 IFF; Sonar: Type 174 search; Type 162 target classification; Type 170 attack
- Armament: 1 × twin 4 in gun Mark 19; 1 × twin 40mm Bofors Mk.5; 2 × Squid A/S mortar or; 2 × Limbo Mark 10 A/S mortar

HMS Zest was a Z-class destroyer of the Royal Navy that saw service during World War II.

== Post war service ==
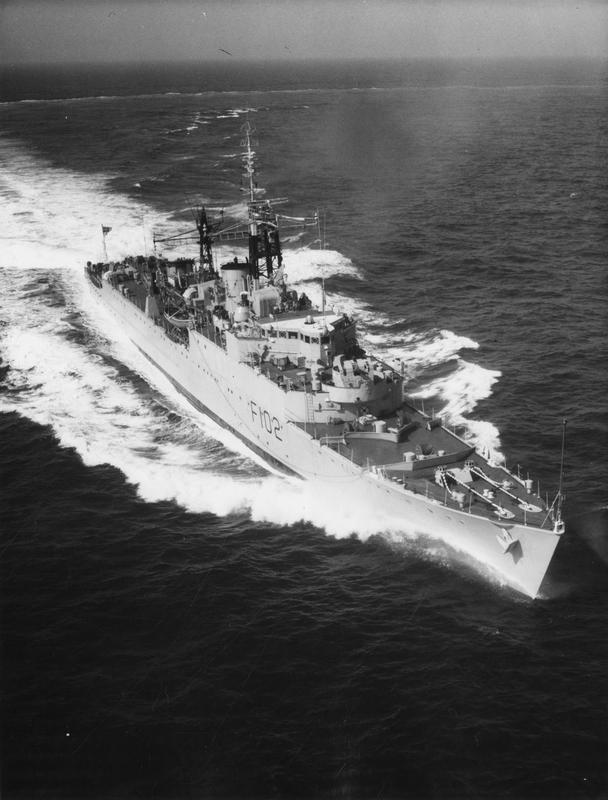
Zest after her conversion to a Type 15-class frigate, 1958 (IWM)

Between September and November 1945 Zest was refitted at Leith. Between August 1946 and February 1947 she was part of the 4th Destroyer Flotilla, as part of the Home Fleet. From July 1947 until February 1948 she was used for torpedo training at Portsmouth.

From September 1952 until February 1954 she was in reserve at Chatham Dockyard. Between 1954 and 1956 she was converted into a Type 15 fast anti-submarine frigate at Chatham Dockyard. She was also allocated the new pennant number F102, changing from its initial R02. She was the only Z-class destroyer to be converted into a Type 15 frigate.

Between 1956 and 1958 she was leader of the 3rd Training Squadron. From 1958 until 1961 she was part of the 4th Frigate Squadron, and in 1961 she had a refit at Malta. In 1964 she joined the Far East Fleet, joining the 24th Escort Squadron. She carried out patrols in the Singapore and Malacca Straits to prevent infiltration of Indonesian-led forces and smuggling of weapons during the Indonesia–Malaysia confrontation. In November 1964, the merchant ship Pompadour ran aground on the Bombay Shoal in the South China Sea, as did the tug Salvonia when she tried to assist. Zest rescued the crews from both ships, 45 people in total, before a typhoon struck the stranded ships. Zest returned to British waters at the end of 1965, paying off at Plymouth of 15 December that year before recommissioning with a new crew. In 1967, while in the West Indies, Zest was deployed at St Vincent during local election period as a precaution. From July 1967 to July 1968 Zest was deployed to the Far East Station visiting Cape Town, Mombasa, Gan, Sydney, Dunedin, New Plymouth, Yokohama, Hong Kong and Singapore

== Decommissioning and disposal ==
In July 1968 she paid off into Reserve at Plymouth. In 1969 she was placed on the Disposal List and sold to BISCO for demolition by Arnott Young at Dalmuir on the Clyde. Whilst on tow by the tug Bustler the ship broke away from tow. After re-connection she arrived at the breakers on 18 July 1970.
