= HMS Wakeful (1943) =

W-class destroyer converted to Type 15 frigate of the Royal Navy

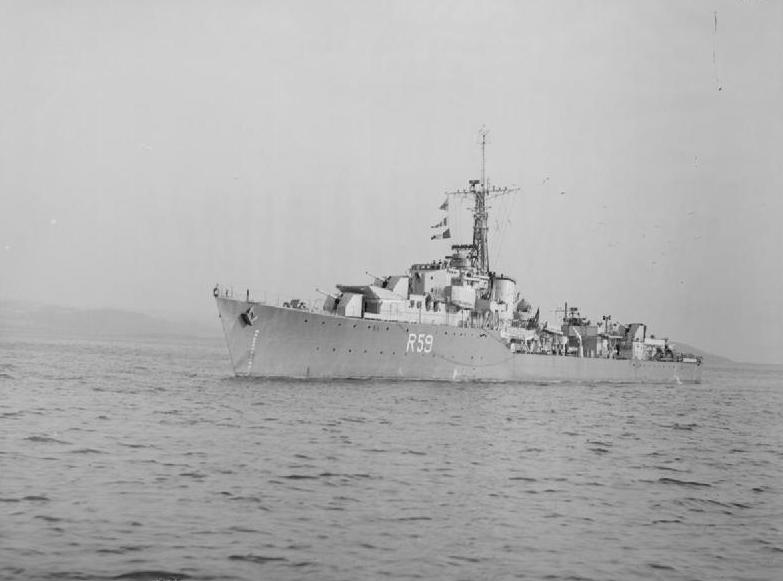
- HMS Wakeful underway on 28 February 1944

History

United Kingdom
- Name: HMS Wakeful
- Ordered: 3 December 1941
- Builder: Fairfield Shipbuilding and Engineering Company, Govan, Scotland
- Laid down: 3 June 1942
- Launched: 30 June 1943
- Commissioned: 17 February 1944
- Identification: Pennant number: 1941 – 1953: R59; 1953 – 1970: F159
- Motto: Si dormiam capiar; ("If I sleep, I may be caught")
- Fate: Sold for scrap on 10 June 1971
- Badge: On a Black field an eye proper with rays ensuing therefore, Gold.

General characteristics as W class
- Class & type: W-class destroyer
- Displacement: 1,710 tons (1,730 tonnes); 2,530 tons full (2,570 tonnes)
- Length: 362.75 ft (110.57 m) o/a
- Beam: 35.75 ft (10.90 m)
- Draught: 10 ft (3.0 m)
- Propulsion: 2 Admiralty 3-drum boilers, Parsons single-reduction geared steam turbines, 40,000 shp (30 MW), 2 shafts
- Speed: 36 knots (67 km/h; 41 mph) / 32 knots (59 km/h; 37 mph) full
- Range: 4,675 nautical miles (8,658 km; 5,380 mi) at 20 knots (37 km/h; 23 mph)
- Complement: 179 (225 as leader)
- Sensors & processing systems: Radar Type 272 target indication; Radar Type 291 air warning; Radar Type 285 fire control on director Mk.III(W); Radar Type 282 fire control on 40 mm mount Mk.IV
- Armament: 4 × QF 4.7-inch (120-mm) L/45 Mk.IX, single mounts CP Mk.XXII; 4 × QF 2 pdr Mk.VIII, quad mount Mk.VII, or; 2 × QF 40 mm Bofors, twin mount "Hazemeyer" Mk.IV; 4 × A/A mountings; twin 20 mm Oerlikon Mk.V; single Bofors 40 mm Mk.III or "Boffin" Mk.V; single QF 2 pdr Mk.XVI; 8 (4x2) tubes for 21 inch (533 mm) torpedoes Mk.IX; 2 racks & 4 throwers for 70 depth charges

General characteristics Type 15 frigate
- Class & type: Type 15 frigate
- Displacement: 2,300 tons (standard)
- Length: 358 ft (109 m) o/a
- Beam: 37.75 ft (11.51 m)
- Draught: 14.5 ft (4.4 m)
- Propulsion: 2 × Admiralty 3-drum boilers, steam turbines on 2 shafts, 40,000 shp (30 MW)
- Speed: 31 knots (57 km/h; 36 mph) (full load)
- Complement: 174
- Sensors & processing systems: Radar; Type 293Q target indication; Type 277Q surface search; Type 974 navigation; Type 262 fire control on director CRBF; Type 1010 Cossor Mark 10 IFF; Sonar: Type 174 search; Type 162 target classification; Type 170 attack
- Armament: 1 × twin 4 in gun Mark 19; 1 × twin 40mm Bofors Mk.5; 2 × Squid A/S mortar or; 2 × Limbo Mark 10 A/S mortar

HMS Wakeful was a W-class destroyer of the Royal Navy launched in 1943. She saw service during the Second World War and was later converted into a Type 15 fast anti-submarine frigate. She was sold for scrap in 1971.

== Construction ==
HMS Wakeful was a W-class destroyer ordered from Fairfield Shipbuilding and Engineering Company, Govan, Glasgow on 3 December 1941 as part of the 9th Emergency Flotilla. She was laid down on 3 June 1942 under the provisional name of Zebra, but was renamed Wakeful in January 1943, exchanging names with a destroyer also under construction, which was subsequently launched as HMS Zebra. She became the second ship of the name, the first being an Admiralty W-class destroyer sunk by a German E-Boat off Dunkirk in 1940 during Operation Dynamo, the evacuation from Dunkirk.

== Service history ==
=== Second World War ===
Wakeful joined the Home Fleet on 17 February 1944 for sea trials and working up, before entering active service in March and forming part of the 27th Destroyer Flotilla when more ships of the class became available. While serving with the Home Fleet the Flotilla was deployed to support Operation Tungsten, where she served as an escort vessel during the air raids on the German battleship Tirpitz in Altenfjord. In May 1944 Wakeful served as an escort during air attacks on German shipping off Narvik and Stadlandet, Norway as part of the 27th Destroyer Flotilla.

Throughout June and July 1944 she was refitted for redeployment to the Eastern Fleet remaining with the 27th Destroyer Flotilla for operations in the Indian Ocean based at Trincomalee. In October 1944 the Eastern Fleet initiated diversionary air attacks on the Nicobar Islands during the US amphibious assault of Leyte. In November 1944 Wakeful, with the remainder of the Flotilla, was transferred to the British Pacific Fleet upon its formation.

In January 1945 she took part in Operation Meridian One as an escort during air attacks on refineries at Pladjoe, and then took part in Operation Meridian Two as an escort during air raids on Soengi-Gerong near Palembang. In March 1945 the British Pacific Fleet joined Admiral Raymond Spruance's United States Fifth Fleet, before joining Admiral William Halsey's United States Third Fleet in May 1945. During August 1945 Wakeful was on escort duties during the Royal Navy and United States Navy's air raids on Hokkaido and North Honshū. The destroyer was in Tokyo Bay during the formal surrender and was available to support the occupation of Japan, remaining in Japanese waters to help with the repatriation of allied nationals before departing for Sydney. She returned to the UK in December 1945, having received the battle honours 'North Sea 1944' and 'East Indies 1944' for her wartime service.

=== Post war ===
Between 1948 and 1950 her captain was Commander Royston Wright.

Wakeful was used as a Boys Training ship until she was converted to a Type 15 anti-submarine warfare frigate by Scotts Shipbuilding and Engineering Company between 1951 and 1953. In 1953 she took part in the Fleet Review to celebrate the Coronation of Queen Elizabeth II.

She was assigned the new pennant number F159 and served in the Mediterranean as a part of the 5th Frigate Squadron until 1957. During this time she took part in Operation Musketeer, the Anglo-French assault on Port Said to take control of the Suez Canal. In 1959 she recommissioned as leader of the Portsmouth Squadron, as a training tender to the Navigational Training School at HMS Dryad, and as trials ship to the Admiralty Surface Weapons Establishment (ASWE). On 25 February 1960 she was used for the burial at sea of Edwina Mountbatten, Countess Mountbatten of Burma off the coast of Portsmouth. On 25 August 1960, the destroyer Battleaxe was carrying out steam trials while moored alongside the minelayer Apollo at Portsmouth, when steam was let into the ship's turbines, driving the ship forward and breaking Apollo's mooring lines. Apollo then collided with Wakeful, which also broke free from her moorings and struck the caisson at the entrance to a dock. Apollo's stem was damaged, while Wakeful suffered buckled plates from the impact by Apollo and a badly damaged bow from the collision with the caisson.

In April 1964 she was part of the 2nd Frigate Squadron and took part in 'Navy Days' in Portsmouth during that year. In the same year Wakeful was used for the filming of the opening scenes of The Bedford Incident, including Sidney Poitier's initial flypast and landing from a Whirlwind helicopter, when her pennant number F159 is clearly visible. (Some interior scenes were filmed in her sister Type 15 frigate Troubridge.)

Between 1966 and 1967 she was fitted with experimental satellite communication equipment and stabilisers for trials. In 1968 she took part in 'Navy Days' at Portsmouth Dockyard and at this time was part of the 2nd Frigate Squadron. On 31 October 1967 she escorted the RMS Queen Mary out of Southampton on her final voyage to Long Beach for retirement. In August 1968 she took part in the Western Fleet Review that sailed 50 ships in a review of the fleet carried out by the newly promoted Admiral of the Fleet Sir Varyl Begg on his retirement.

HMS Wakeful (Commanded by Lt.Cdr. David Whitehead) also went up the Ouistreham Canal for the 25th Anniversary of D Day in June 1969. Later that year she was replaced by Grenville. and Lieutenant Commander David Whitehead was transferred to HMS Grenville as her new commanding officer at this time.

== Decommissioning and disposal ==
In 1970 Wakeful was put on the Disposal List, and on 26 February left Portsmouth for de-equipping. She was sold to Thos. W. Ward for scrapping on 10 July 1971 and arrived in tow at Inverkeithing for demolition on 5 July that year.

== Affiliations ==
Official affiliation

- Darwen, Lancashire
