= HMS Zebra (R81) =

Destroyer of the Royal Navy

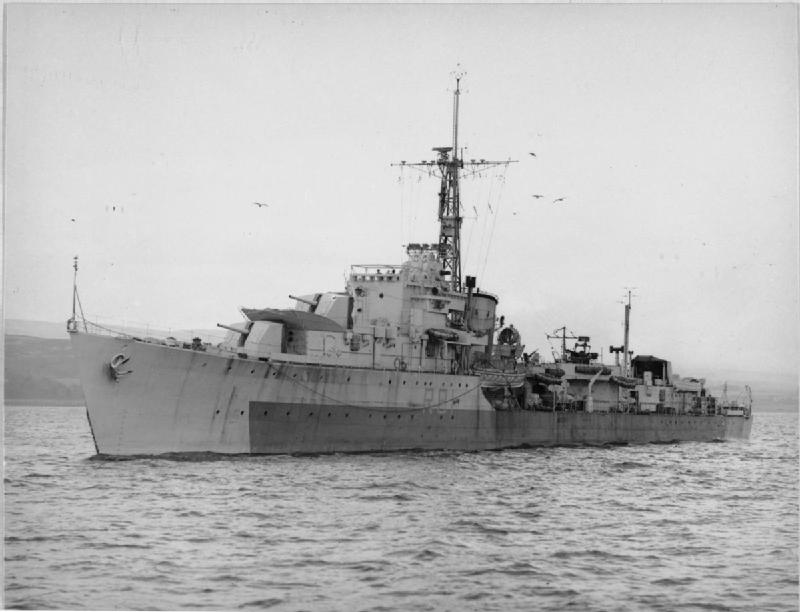

History

United Kingdom
- Name: HMS Zebra
- Namesake: zebra
- Ordered: 12 February 1942
- Builder: William Denny & Brothers, Dumbarton
- Laid down: 14 May 1942
- Launched: 18 March 1944
- Commissioned: 13 October 1944
- Identification: Pennant number: R81
- Fate: Arrived in Newport for breaking up 12 February 1959

General characteristics
- Class & type: Z-class destroyer
- Displacement: 1,710 tons
- Length: 362 ft 9 in (110.57 m)
- Beam: 35 ft 8 in (10.87 m)
- Draught: 10 ft (3.0 m)
- Propulsion: Twin steam turbines
- Speed: 37 knots (69 km/h; 43 mph) maximum
- Complement: 185
- Armament: 4 × QF 4.5 in (114 mm) guns; 5 × 40 mm guns; 8 × 21 inch (533 mm) torpedo tubes

HMS Zebra was a Z-class destroyer. She was to have been named HMS Wakeful but was renamed in January 1943 before launching. The destroyer was launched on 18 March 1944 at William Denny & Brothers shipyard in Dumbarton, Scotland and commissioned on 13 October 1944. She was 'adopted' by the civil community of Urmston, then in the county of Lancashire.

== Design and construction ==
The Z-class were War Emergency Programme destroyers, intended for general duties, including use as anti-submarine escort, and were to be suitable for mass-production. They were based on the hull and machinery of the pre-war J-class destroyers, but with a lighter armament (effectively whatever armament was available) in order to speed production. The Z-class of eight ships formed the 10th Emergency Flotilla, one of five flotillas of War Emergency destroyers ordered under the 1941 War Construction Programme (the U, V, W, Z and Ca-classes (40 destroyers)).

The Z-class were 362 feet 9 inches (110.57 m) long overall, 348 feet 0 inches (106.07 m) at the waterline and 339 feet 6 inches (103.48 m) between perpendiculars, with a beam of 35 feet 8 inches (10.87 m) and a draught of 10 feet 0 inches (3.05 m) mean and 14 feet 3 inches (4.34 m) full load. Displacement was 1,710 long tons (1,740 t) standard and 2,530 long tons (2,570 t) full load. Two Admiralty 3-drum water-tube boilers supplied steam at 300 pounds per square inch (2,100 kPa) and 630 °F (332 °C) to two sets of Parsons single-reduction geared steam turbines, which drove two propeller shafts. The machinery was rated at 40,000 shaft horsepower (30,000 kW) giving a maximum speed of 36 knots (41 mph; 67 km/h) and 32 knots (37 mph; 59 km/h) at full load. 615 tons of oil were carried, giving a range of 4,675 nautical miles (5,380 mi; 8,658 km) at 20 knots (23 mph; 37 km/h).

The ship had a main gun armament of four 4.5-inch (120 mm) QF Mk. IV guns, capable of elevating to an angle of 55 degrees, giving a degree of anti-aircraft capability, with the Z-class being the first class of destroyers to use the new gun. The close-in anti-aircraft armament was one Hazemayer stabilised twin mount for the Bofors 40 mm gun, and six Oerlikon 20 mm cannons (two twin and two single mounts, which was modified in 1945 by replacing two of the Oerlikons with two single 2-pounder (40 mm) "pom-pom" autocannon. Two quadruple mount for 21-inch (533 mm) torpedoes was fitted, while the ship had a depth charge outfit of four depth charge mortars and two racks, with a total of 70 charges carried. Zebra had a crew of 179 officers and other ranks.

The eight destroyers of the Z-class were ordered in February 1942, (Note: On 10 February 1942 according to Friedman and 12 February 1942 according to English and Raven & Roberts.) The ship that was to become Zebra was laid down at William Denny and Brothers's Dumbarton shipyard on 14 May 1942 as Wakeful. The ship was renamed in January 1943, with the destroyer that was previously to be named Zebra, under construction at Fairfield's was renamed Wakeful at the same time. Zebra was launched on 8 March 1944 and completed on 13 October 1944, commissioning the same day. She was the sixth ship called Zebra to serve with the Royal Navy.

== Second World War ==
After commissioning, Zebra underwent a period of working up before joining the 2nd Destroyer Flotilla of the Home Fleet based at Scapa Flow. Operational duties were delayed by a series of accidents, including a collision with the oiler San Castro on 3 October 1944 and with a jetty at Greenock on 15 October, and the destroyer was under repair at Glasgow from 25 November to 16 December 1944. Duties included screening duty and patrol on the North Western Approaches, along with She escorted a number of Arctic convoys, and other operations in the North Sea and off the coast of Scandinavia. On 1 January 1945, Zebra joined the escort for the Arctic convoy JW63, which had left Loch Ewe in Scotland on 30 December. She remained part of the convoy's outer screen of escorts until it arrived unharmed at the Kola Inlet on 8 January. Zebra again formed part of the return convoy, Convoy RA 63, which left Kola on 11 January and arrived at Loch Ewe on 21 January. Zebra was meant to form part of the escort for the next outbound Arctic convoy, JW 64, but defects forced her to turn back and put into the Faroe Islands. After repair, on 11 February 1945, she formed part of the escort for the escort carriers Premier and Puncher during Operation Selenium, a minelaying and anti shipping operation off the coast of Norway. From 26 to 27 February, Zebra reinforced the escort of the UK-bound Arctic convoy RA 64. Zebra underwent repairs and maintenance at Liverpool from 17 March to 15 May 1945. As the war reached its end Zebra was deployed with the Home Fleet to support operations to re-occupy countries previously under German occupation, and this included guardship duties.

== Postwar ==
After the end of the war Zebra joined the 4th Destroyer Flotilla in which she served until 1947. The vessel was then paid-off and was reduced to reserve status in the Plymouth Reserve Fleet. During 1952 she was with the Harwich Reserve Fleet and returned to Plymouth a year later.

== Decommissioning and disposal ==
The ship was nominated for conversion to an anti-submarine frigate and her main armament was to be removed. However, in 1955 this work was cancelled and the ship was placed on the Sale List. There were plans to transfer her to West Germany, but after inspection by West German officials the proposal was rejected due to her poor condition and she was sold to BISCO in 1958 for breaking-up at Newport, Monmouth by Cashmore. On 12 February 1959 she arrived in tow at the breakers yard.

== Bibliography ==
- Colledge, J. J.; Warlow, Ben (2006) [1969]. Ships of the Royal Navy: The Complete Record of All Fighting Ships of the Royal Navy from the 15th Century to the Present (3rd Rev ed.). London: Chatham Publishing. ISBN 978-1-86176-281-8. OCLC 67375475.
- Critchley, Mike (1982). British Warships Since 1945: Part 3: Destroyers. Liskeard, UK: Maritime Books. ISBN 0-9506323-9-2.
- English, John (2008). Obdurate to Daring: British Fleet Destroyers 1941–45. Windsor, UK: World Ship Society. ISBN 978-0-9560769-0-8.
- Friedman, Norman (2008). British Destroyers & Frigates: The Second World War and After. Barnsley, UK: Seaforth Publishing. ISBN 978-1-84832-015-4.
- Gardiner, Robert; Chesneau, Roger, eds. (1980). Conway's All The World's Fighting Ships 1922–1946. London: Conway Maritime Press. ISBN 0-85177-146-7.
- Marriott, Leo (1989). Royal Navy Destroyers Since 1945. Ian Allan Ltd. ISBN 0-7110-1817-0.
- Lenton, H. T. (1970). Navies of the Second World War: British Fleet & Escort Destroyers Volume Two. London: Macdonald & Co. ISBN 0-356-03122-5.
- Raven, Alan; Roberts, John (1978). War Built Destroyers O to Z Classes. London: Bivouac Books. ISBN 0-85680-010-4.
- Rohwer, Jürgen; Hümmelchen, Gerhard (1992). Chronology of the War at Sea 1939–1945. London: Greenhill Books. ISBN 1-85367-117-7.
- Ruegg, Bob; Hague, Arnold (1993). Convoys to Russia 1941–1945. Kendal, UK: World Ship Society. ISBN 0-905617-66-5.
- Whitley, M. J. (1988). Destroyers of World War 2. Annapolis, Maryland: Naval Institute Press. ISBN 0-87021-326-1.
- Whitley, M. J. (2000). Destroyers of World War 2: An International Encyclopedia. London: Cassell & Co. ISBN 1-85409-521-8.
