= W and Z-class destroyer =

Ship class

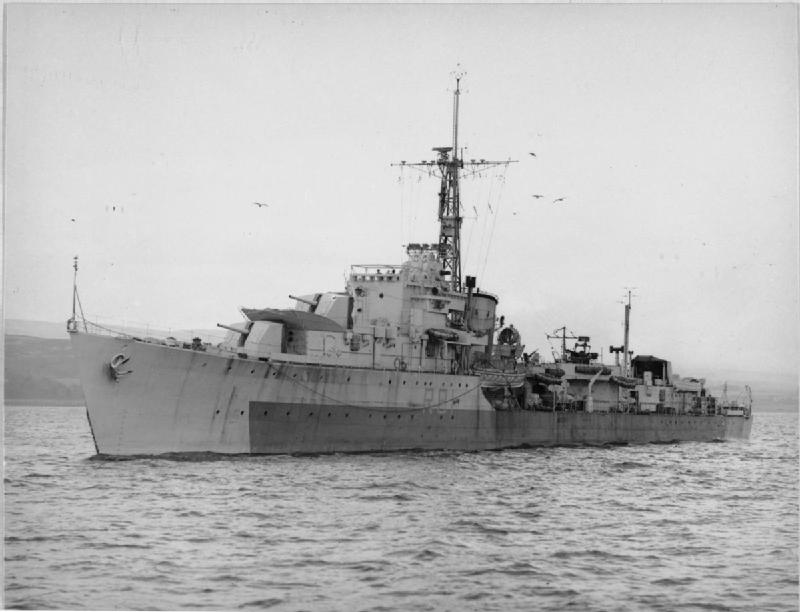
- HMS Zebra on 12 October 1944

Class overview
- Name: W and Z class
- Operators: Royal Navy; South African Navy; Yugoslav Navy; Egyptian Navy; Israeli Navy
- Preceded by: U and V class
- Succeeded by: C class
- Subclasses: W, Z
- In commission: 1943 - 1971
- Completed: 16
- Lost: 4 (2 as targets)
- Retired: 12

General characteristics (W class)
- Type: Destroyer
- Displacement: 1,710 tons (1,730 tonnes); 2,530 tons full (2,570 tonnes)
- Length: 362.75 ft (110.57 m) o/a
- Beam: 35.75 ft (10.90 m)
- Draught: 10 ft (3.0 m)
- Propulsion: 2 Admiralty 3-drum boilers, Parsons single-reduction geared steam turbines, 40,000 shp (30 MW), 2 shafts
- Speed: 36 knots (67 km/h; 41 mph) / 32 knots (59 km/h; 37 mph) full
- Range: 4,675 nautical miles (8,658 km; 5,380 mi) at 20 knots (37 km/h; 23 mph)
- Complement: 179 (225 as leader)
- Sensors & processing systems: Radar Type 272 target indication; Type 291 radar air warning; Type 285 radar fire control on director Mk.III(W); Type 282 radar fire control on 40 mm mount Mk.IV
- Armament: 4 × QF 4.7 inch (120-mm) L/45 Mk.IX guns, single mounts CP Mk.XXII; 4 × QF 2-pounder (40-mm) Mk.VIII "pom-poms", quad mount Mk.VII, or; 2 × QF 40 mm Bofors, twin mount "Hazemeyer" Mk.IV; 4 × A/A mountings; twin 20 mm Oerlikon Mk.V; single Bofors 40 mm Mk.III or "Boffin" Mk.V; single QF 2-pounder Mk.XVI; 8 (2x4) tubes for 21-inch (530 mm) torpedoes Mk.IX; 2 racks & 4 throwers for 70 depth charges

General characteristics (Z class)
- Displacement: 1,830 tons (1,860 tonnes); 2,530 tons full (2,570 tonnes)
- Sensors & processing systems: Type 293 radar target indication; Type 285 fire-control radar on director type K
- Armament: 4 x QF 4.5 in (113 mm) Mk.IV guns, single mounts CP Mk.V
- Notes: Other characteristics as per W class

The W and Z class was a class of sixteen destroyers of the Royal Navy launched in 1943–1944. They were constructed as two flotillas, with names beginning with "W-" and "Z-", respectively, although, like the preceding U and V class, two of the flotilla leaders were named after historical naval figures (as had been Royal Navy practice during the inter-war years). They were known as the 9th and 10th Emergency Flotilla, respectively and served as fleet and convoy escorts in World War II. None were lost during World War II but INS Eilat (originally HMS Zealous) was sunk during the Israel-Egypt conflict in October 1967 by Egyptian missile boats while the El Qaher (originally HMS Myngs) of the Egyptian Navy was sunk at Berenice, Egypt on 16 May 1970 by Israeli Air Force aircraft during the War of Attrition.

== Design ==
Repeats of the preceding U and V-class destroyers, with modified director structures. The Z class were armed with 4.5 inch guns.

== Ships ==
=== W class ===
Construction data for W-class destroyers
Ship	Shipyard	Launched	Fate/notes
Kempenfelt	John Brown, Clydebank	8 May 1943	Flotilla leader. Sold to Yugoslavia 1956. After refit served as Kotor. Scrapped 1971
Wager	John Brown, Clydebank	1 November 1943	Sold to Yugoslavia 1956, served as Pula after refit. Scrapped 1971.
Wakeful	Fairfields of Glasgow	30 June 1943	converted to Type 15 anti submarine frigate, later a training ship, scrapped 1971
Wessex	Fairfields of Glasgow	2 September 1943	Transferred to South Africa, 1950 as Jan van Riebeeck Scrapped 1978.
Whelp	Hawthorn Leslie	3 June 1943	Transferred to South Africa, 1953 as Simon van der Stel. Scrapped Durban 1976.
Whirlwind	Hawthorn Leslie	30 August 1943	converted to Type 15 A/S frigate, lost while used as target 1974
Wizard	Vickers-Armstrongs, Barrow	29 September 1943	Broken up in March 1967 at Inverkeithing.
Wrangler	Vickers-Armstrongs, Barrow	30 December 1943	Transferred to South Africa, 1957 as Vrystaat. Sunk as target 1976.

=== Z class ===
Construction data for Z-class destroyers
Ship	Shipyard	Launched	Fate/notes
Myngs	Vickers-Armstrongs, Tyneside	31 May 1943	Flotilla leader completed June 1944. Transferred to Egypt, 1955 as El Qaher. Sunk in 1970 by Israel aircraft
Zephyr	Vickers-Armstrongs, Tyneside	15 July 1943	Broken up July 1958 at Dunston.
Zambesi	Cammell Laird, Birkenhead	12 November 1943	Broken up December 1959 at Briton Ferry.
Zealous	Cammell Laird, Birkenhead	28 February 1944	Transferred to Israel 1955 as Eilat, sunk 1967 by an Egyptian missile boat.
Zebra	William Denny and Brothers, Dumbarton	8 March 1944	Broken up February 1959 at Newport.
Zenith	William Denny and Brothers, Dumbarton	5 June 1944	Refitted 1950. Transferred to Egypt, 1955 as El Fateh Modernised in UK 1963–1964.
Zest	John I. Thornycroft, Woolston	14 October 1943	Refitted 1945. Sold in 1969 and broken up 1970
Zodiac	John I. Thornycroft, Woolston	11 March 1944	Transferred to Israel, 1955 as Yaffo. Taken out of service in 1972

== See also ==
- The V and W-class destroyers: World War I destroyer class.
- Type 15 frigate: postwar full conversion of Wartime Emergency Programme destroyers into first-rate fast anti-submarine frigates
