= HMS Mendip =

Destroyer of the Royal Navy

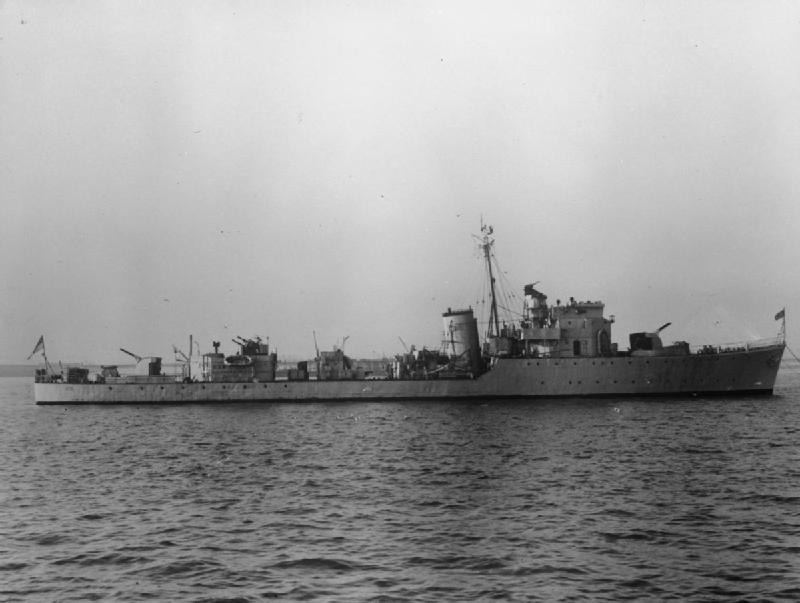
- HMS Mendip in 1948

History

United Kingdom
- Ordered: 11 April 1939
- Builder: Swan Hunter, Wallsend
- Laid down: 10 August 1939
- Launched: 9 April 1940
- Commissioned: 12 October 1940
- Out of service: 20 May 1946
- Recommissioned: June 1949 following repossession from ROC
- Identification: Pennant number: L60
- Honours and awards: North Sea 1941–45; English Channel 1942–43; Sicily 1943; Salerno 1943; Mediterranean 1943; Normandy 1944
- Fate: Sold to Egypt
- Badge: On a field Red, on a White roundel, a bugle horn stringed Black within the strings a blue rose.

China
- Name: Lin Fu
- Commissioned: 21 January 1948
- Out of service: 29 May 1949
- Fate: Returned to RN control after the Nationalist Government fell.

Egypt
- Name: Mohammed Ali el-Kebir
- Acquired: 9 November 1949
- Renamed: Ibrahim el-Awal
- Fate: Captured by Israel on 31 October 1956 and commissioned as INS Haifa (K-38)

Israel
- Name: INS Haifa
- Acquired: 31 October 1956 (captured)
- Decommissioned: 1968
- Home port: Haifa
- Identification: K-38
- Fate: Used as target ship, sank by missile in 1970
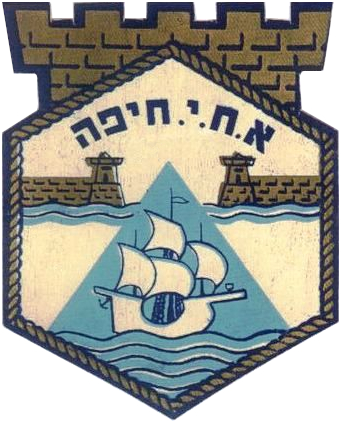
- Badge

General characteristics
- Class & type: Type I Hunt-class destroyer
- Displacement: 1,050 long tons (1,070 t) standard; 1,430 long tons (1,450 t) full load
- Length: 85.3 m (279 ft 10 in) o/a
- Beam: 9.6 m (31 ft 6 in)
- Draught: 2.51 m (8 ft 3 in)
- Propulsion: 2 Admiralty 3-drum boilers; 2 shaft Parsons geared turbines, 19,000 shp (14,170 kW)
- Speed: 27.5 knots (31.6 mph; 50.9 km/h); 26 kn (29.9 mph; 48.2 km/h) full
- Range: 3,500 nmi (6,500 km) at 15 kn (28 km/h); 1,000 nmi (1,850 km) at 26 kn (48 km/h)
- Complement: 164
- Armament: 4 × QF 4-inch (102 mm) Mark XVI guns on twin mounts Mk. XIX; 4 × QF 2-pounder (40 mm) Mk. VIII AA guns on quad mount MK.VII; 2 × 20 mm Oerlikon AA guns on single mounts P Mk. III; 50 depth charges, 2 throwers, 1 rack

HMS Mendip (L60) was a Hunt-class destroyer of the Royal Navy. She was a member of the first subgroup of the class. The ship is notable for seeing service in the navies of three other nations after her use by the Royal Navy. She saw service in the Second World War and later as an Egyptian Navy ship in the Suez Crisis. She was captured in battle on 31 October 1956 by the Israeli Navy and re-commissioned as INS Haifa (K-38).

== Construction and commissioning ==
Mendip was ordered under the 1939 Naval Building Programme from Swan Hunter at Wallsend on 17 April 1939. She was laid down as Job No. J4111 on 10 August 1939 and launched on 9 April 1940. She was the first Royal Navy ship to carry the name of the fox hunt in Somerset. Construction of the ship was completed on 16 October 1940, and following a successful Warship Week National Savings campaign in March 1942 she was adopted by the civil community of Shepton Mallet, Somerset.

== Career in World War II ==
On commissioning Mendip was assigned to the Home Fleet's base at Scapa Flow for working-up in October, but sustained damage when one of her own depth charges exploded during work up exercises. She was repaired and resumed work up on 18 February 1941. On 30 March she was assigned to the 21st Destroyer Flotilla at Sheerness where she spent the next two years on convoy escort and patrol duties in the North Sea and English Channel. During this time Mendip protected coastal traffic against attack by German aircraft and E-boats, rescued survivors, took part in minelaying and offensive operations against enemy installations. In September 1942 she became senior ship in 21 Flotilla with the appointment of Captain CR Parry, 21 Flotilla's Captain (D), as her commander.

In June 1943, after a refit, Mendip was assigned to escort convoy WS31, part of the invasion force for Operation Husky, and in July took part in the invasion of Sicily itself. In September Mendip was part of Operation Avalanche, the landings at Salerno, part of the Allied invasion of Italy. For the remainder of the year she took part in convoy escort and patrol duties, assisting in the Mediterranean.

in May 1944 Mendip returned to Britain to take part in Operation Neptune, the naval component of the Normandy landings. Following this she returned to 21 Flotilla and local escort duties in the English Channel and North Sea, until VE Day in May 1945.

== Post-war career ==
Mendip's last assignment was with Operation Deadlight, the disposal of the German U-boat fleet, and in January 1946 she was paid off and placed in Reserve.

=== Chinese Navy service ===
In May 1948 Mendip was lent to the Chinese Navy, together with HMS Aurora, and was renamed Lin Fu, after major general Zhang Lingfu, commander of the 74th division, who fell during the Chinese Civil War. After Aurora (renamed Chung King) defected to the communists in February 1949, she was repossessed by the Royal Navy in June 1949 and re-commissioned with the ship's company of HMS Consort.

=== Egyptian Navy service ===
In November 1949 Mendip was sold to the Egyptian navy, becoming Mohammed Ali el-Kebir on 15 November. She was renamed Ibrahim el-Awal later in 1951.

In 1956, Ibrahim el-Awal took part in the naval operations during the Suez Crisis, and on 30 October 1956, she was dispatched to Haifa with the aim of shelling that city's coastal oil installations. On 31 October she reached Haifa and began bombarding the city with her four 102 mm (4-inch) guns. The French destroyer Kersaint, which was deployed in Haifa harbour to guard the port as part of Operation Musketeer, opened fire on Ibrahim el-Awal but scored no hits. Soon after, Israeli warships challenged Ibrahim el-Awal and the Egyptian warship immediately retreated. The Israeli warships gave chase and together with the Israeli Air Force, succeeded in damaging the vessel's turbo generator and rudder. Left without power and unable to steer, Ibrahim el-Awal surrendered to the Israeli Navy.

=== Israeli Navy service ===
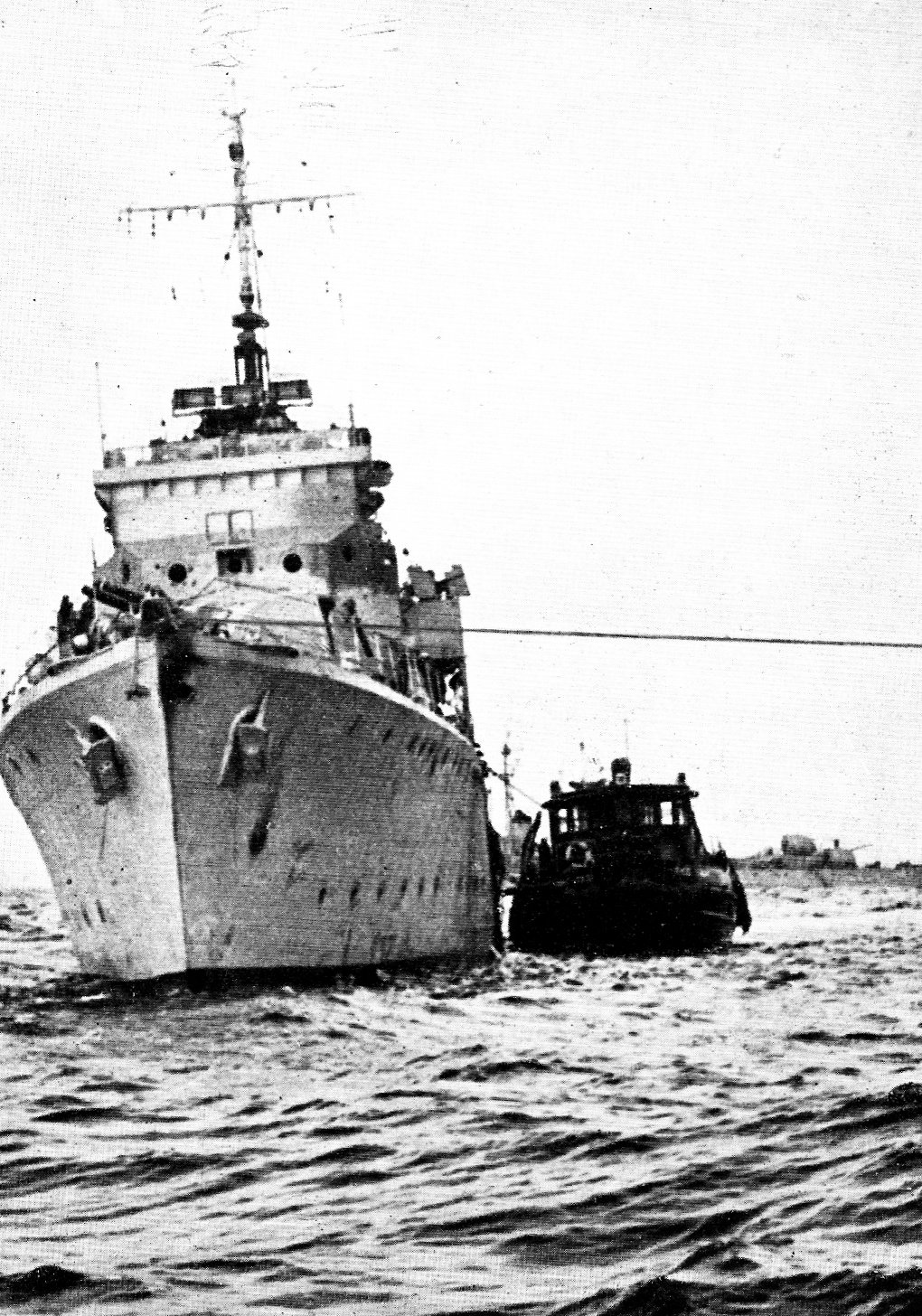
Ibrahim el-Awal being towed to the port of Haifa after being captured by the Israeli Navy.

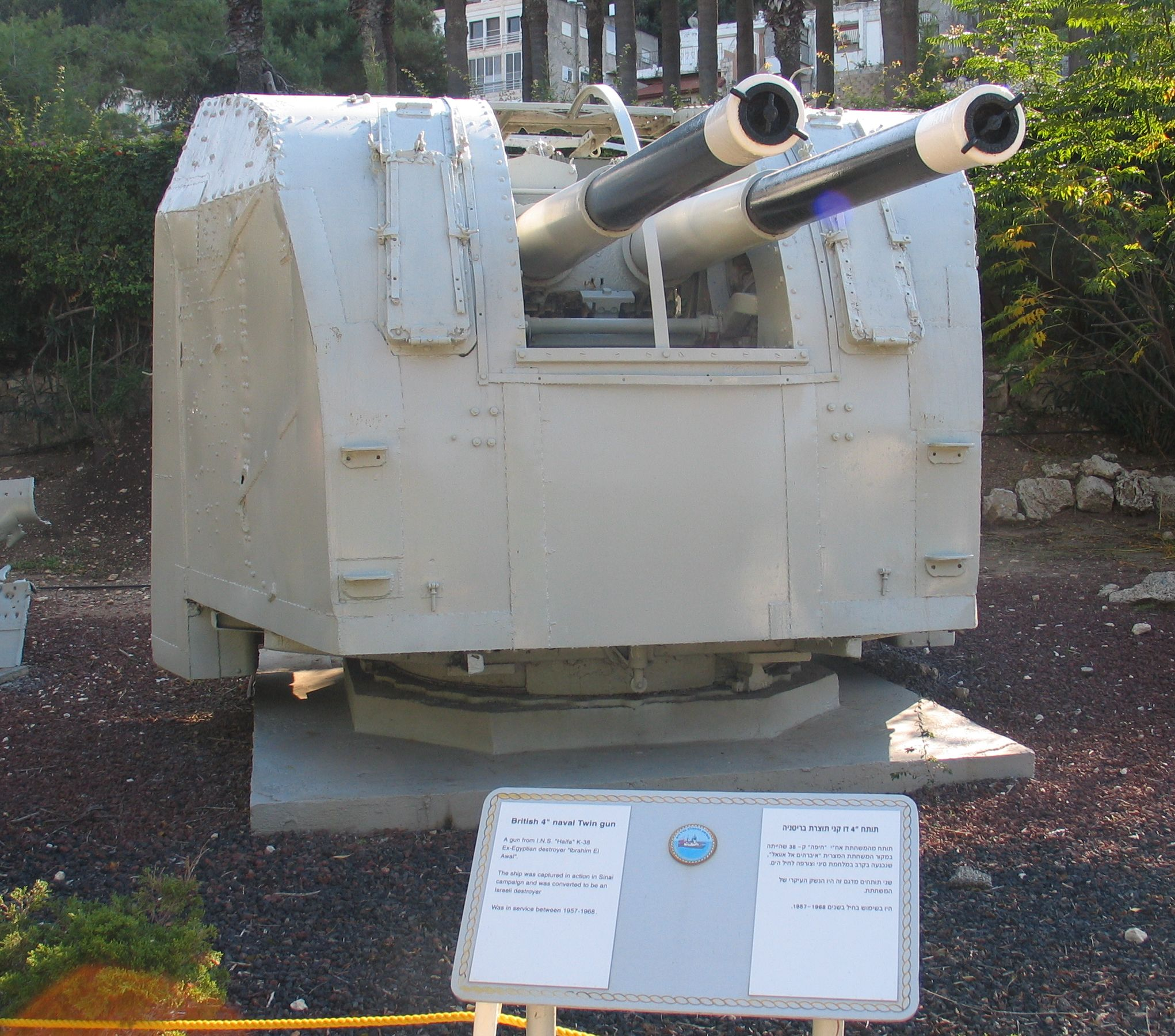
The twin 4-inch gun of INS Haifa

The Egyptian destroyer was subsequently incorporated into the Israeli Navy and renamed Haifa. She served with the Israeli navy through the late 1960s, when she was decommissioned, she was relegated to duty as a target ship in 1968 and sunk in 1970 after being hit by a Gabriel missile.

One of her twin 4-inch gun turrets and a depth charge thrower are preserved at the Clandestine Immigration and Naval Museum, Haifa.

== Publications ==
- Colledge, J. J.; Warlow, Ben (2006) [1969]. Ships of the Royal Navy: The Complete Record of All Fighting Ships of the Royal Navy from the 15th Century to the Present (3rd Rev ed.). London: Chatham Publishing. ISBN 978-1-86176-281-8. OCLC 67375475.
